= Delahaye 135 =

Delahaye 135/138/148/168
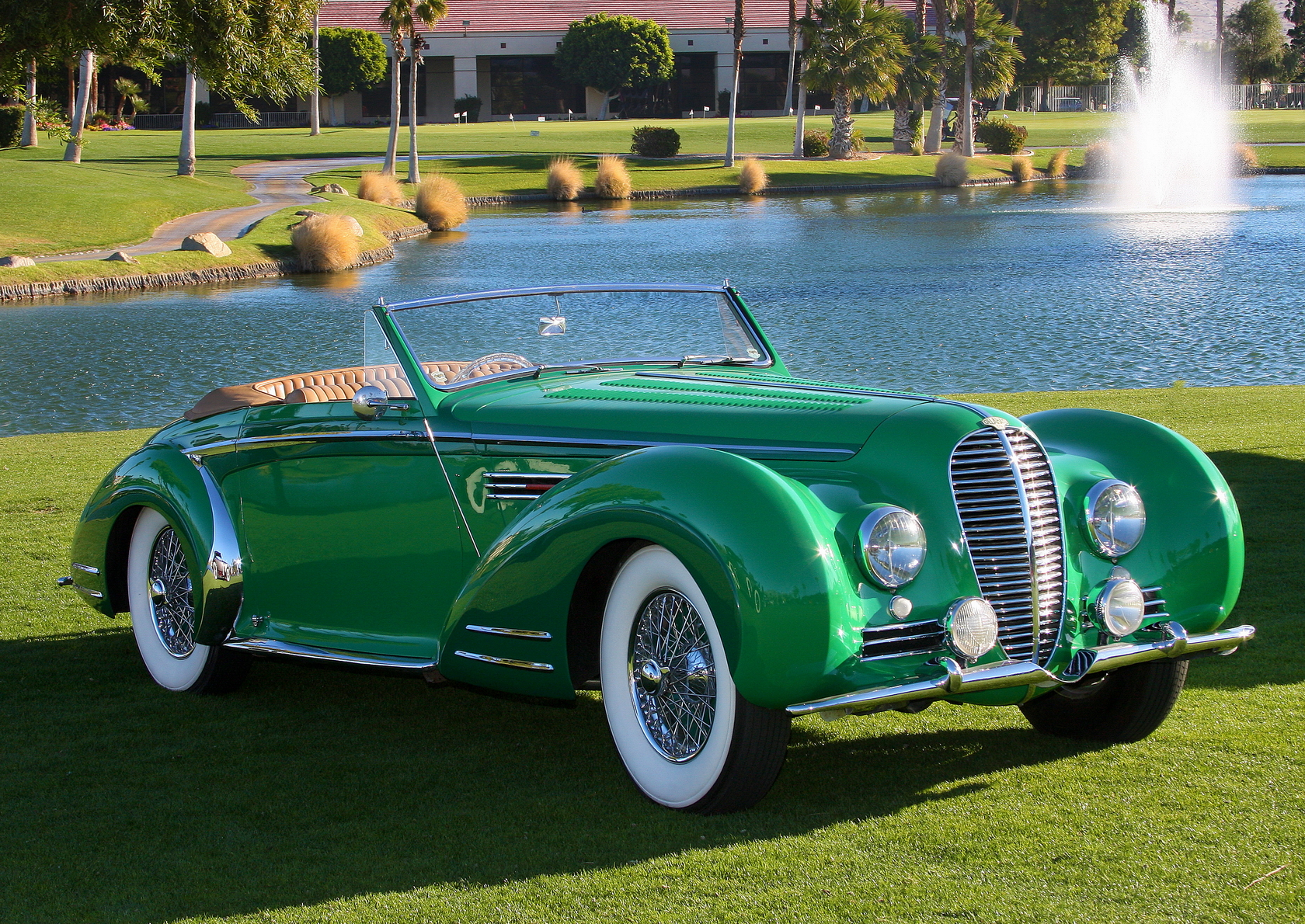
- 1948 Delahaye Type 135-MS Chapron cabriolet "Vedette" 1948 (chassis 800 384)

Overview
- Manufacturer: Delahaye
- Production: 1935–1954; ca. 2,000 built
- Designer: Jean François

Body and chassis
- Class: Luxury car
- Layout: FR layout
- Related: Delahaye 134; Delahaye 145; Delahaye 175

Powertrain
- Engine: 3,227 cc straight-6, 95–110 hp (71–82 kW); 3,557 cc straight-6, 90–160 hp (67–119 kW)
- Transmission: 4-speed manual 4-speed pre-selector

Dimensions
- Wheelbase: 2,950 mm (116 in)
- Curb weight: 935 kg (2,061 lb) (chassis); 1,250–1,640 kg (2,760–3,620 lb)

Chronology
- Successor: Delahaye 235

The Delahaye 135 is a luxury car manufactured by French automaker Delahaye. Designed by engineer Jean François, it was produced from 1935 until 1954 in many different body styles. A sporting tourer, it was also popular for racing.

== History ==
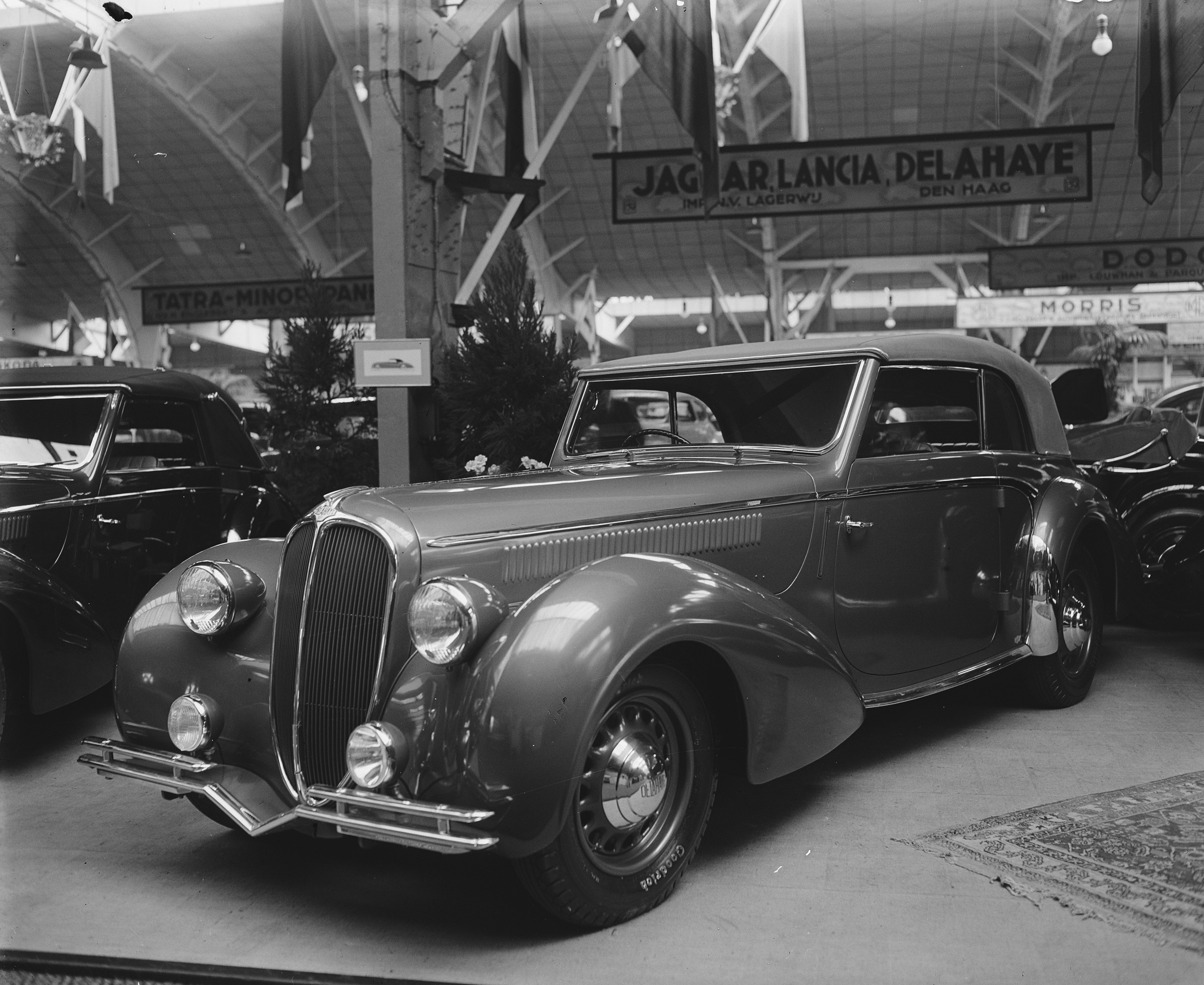
1948 Delahaye 148-L Cabriolet

The Delahaye 135, also known as "Coupe des Alpes" after its success in the Alpine Rally, was first presented in 1935 and signified Delahaye's decision to build sportier cars than before. The 3.2-litre overhead valve straight-six with four-bearing crankshaft was derived from one of Delahaye's truck engines and was also used in the more sedate, longer wheelbase (3,160 mm or 124 in) Delahaye 138. Power was 95 hp (71 kW) in twin carburetor form, but 110 hp (82 kW) were available in a version with three downdraught Solex carbs, offering a 148 km/h (92 mph) top speed. The 138 had a single carburetor and 76 hp (57 kW), and was available in a sportier 90 hp (67 kW) iteration.

The 135 featured independent, leaf-sprung front suspension, a live rear axle, and cable operated Bendix brakes. 17-inch spoked wheels were also standard. Transmission was either a partially synchronized four-speed manual or four-speed Cotal pre-selector transmission.

Competition 135s set the all-time record at the Ulster Tourist Trophy and placed second and third in the Mille Miglia in 1936, and the 1938 24 Hours of Le Mans.

The list of independent body suppliers offering to clothe the 135 chassis is the list of France's top coachbuilders of the time, including Figoni & Falaschi, Letourneur et Marchand, Alphonse Guilloré, Marcel Pourtout, Frères Dubois, Jacques Saoutchik, Marius Franay, Henri Chapron, Faget-Varnay, Antem, and others.

Production of the 3.2-litre version ended with the German occupation in 1940 and was not taken up again after the end of hostilities.

=== 135M ===
A larger-displacement (3,557 cc) 135M was introduced in 1936. Largely the same as the regular 135, the new engine offered 90, 105, or 115 hp, with either one, two, or three carburetors. As with the 135/138, a less sporty, longer wheelbase version was also built, called the "148". The 148 had a 3,150 mm wheelbase, or 3,350 mm in a seven-seater version. On the two shorter wheelbases, a 134N was also available, with a 2,150 cc four-cylinder version of the 3.2-litre six from the 135. Along with a brief return of the 134, production of 148, 135M, and 135MS models was resumed after the end of the war. The 135 and 148 were then joined by the one litre larger engined Delahaye 175 / 175S; 178; and 180, being an entirely new series that was under development before the war. When the large displacement chassis-series was discontinued in 1951, the 135M was updated to be introduced as the Type 235, as a last ditch effort to save Delahaye. The 235 was offered until the demise of Delahaye in 1954, but only 84 examples were built.

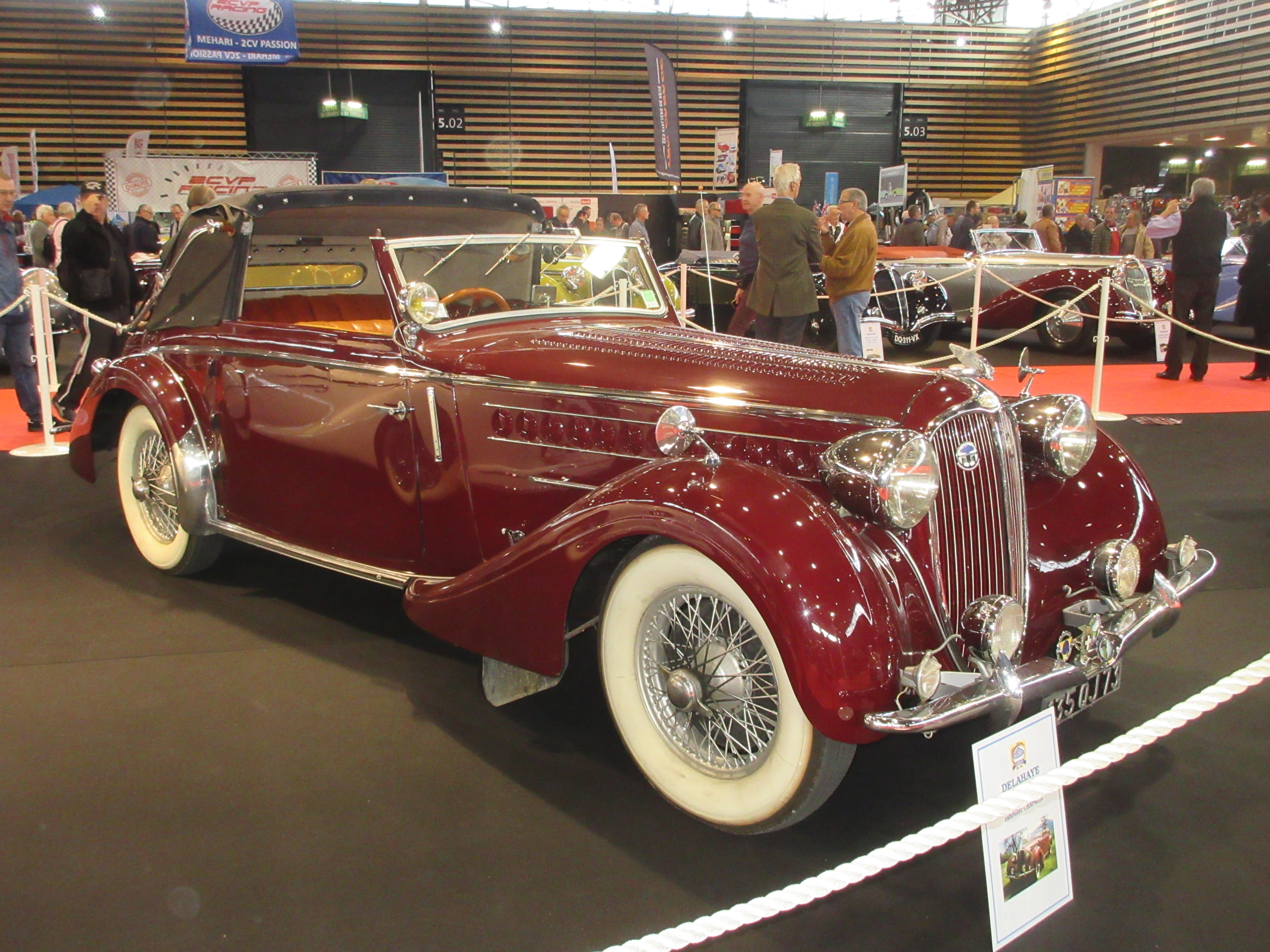
1937 Delahaye 135-M Cabriolet Chapron

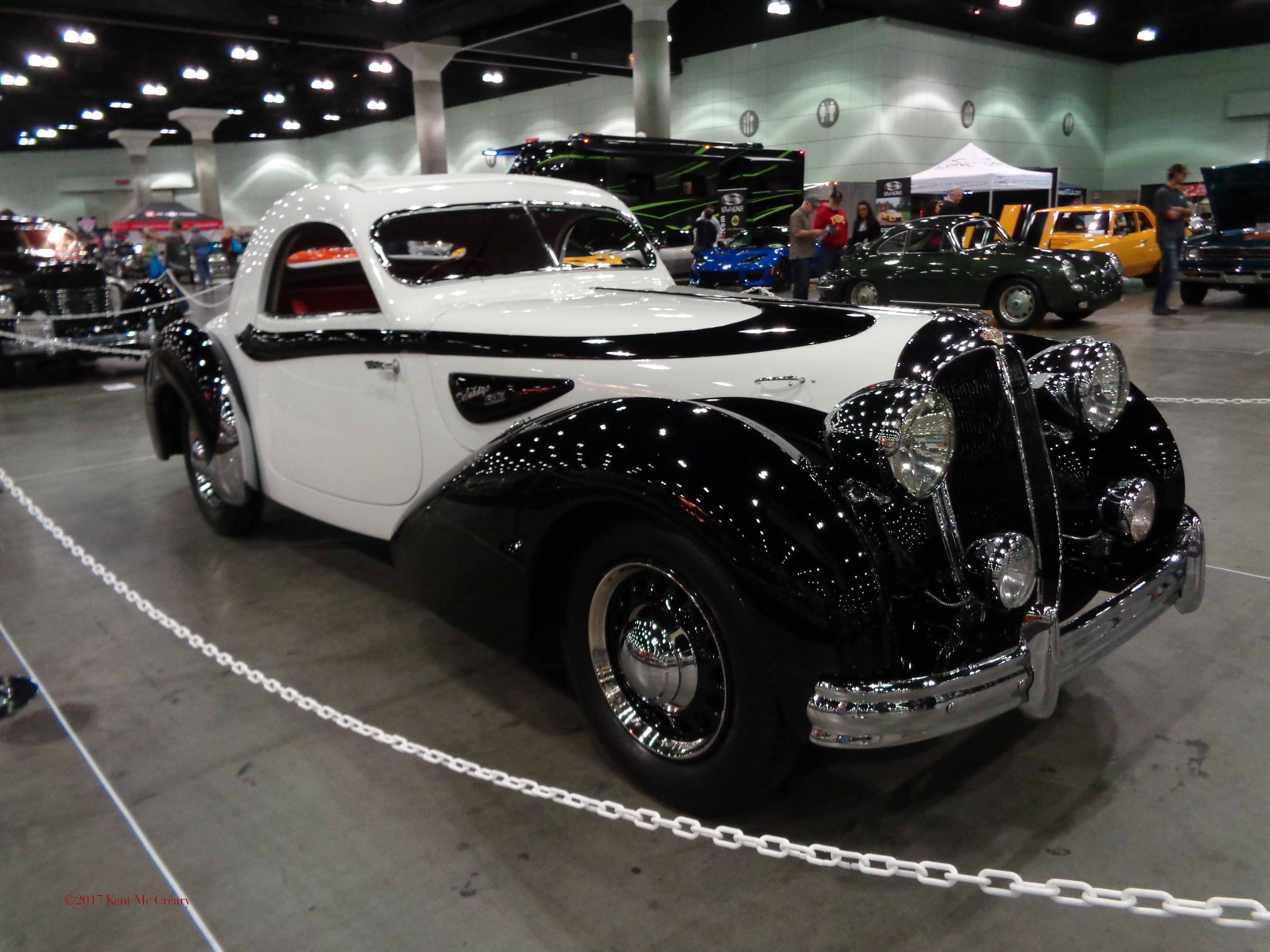
1937 Delahaye Type 135-M Dubos uncoverable coupe (chassis 47 633)

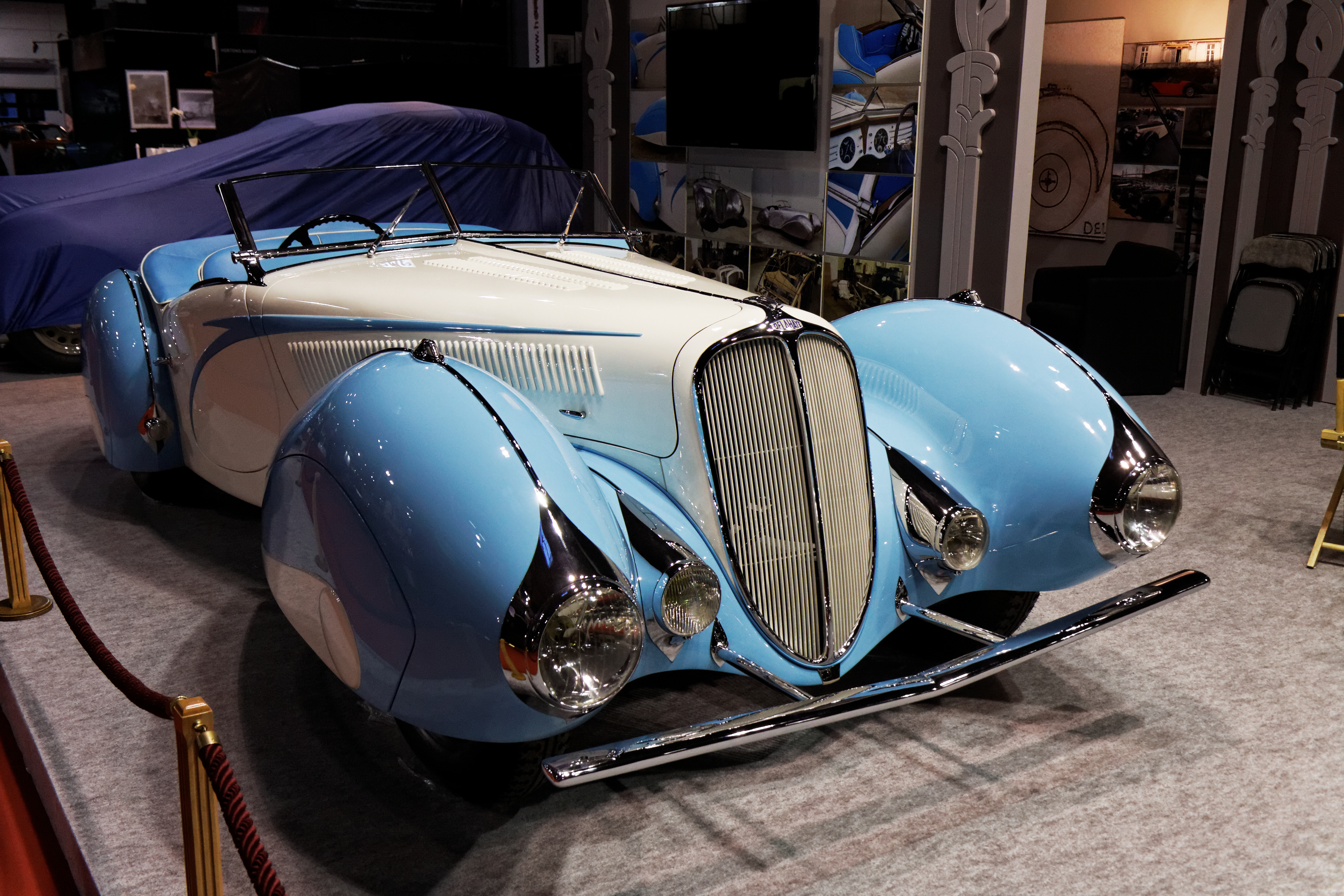
1937 Delahaye Type 135-M roadster body by Figoni & Falaschi

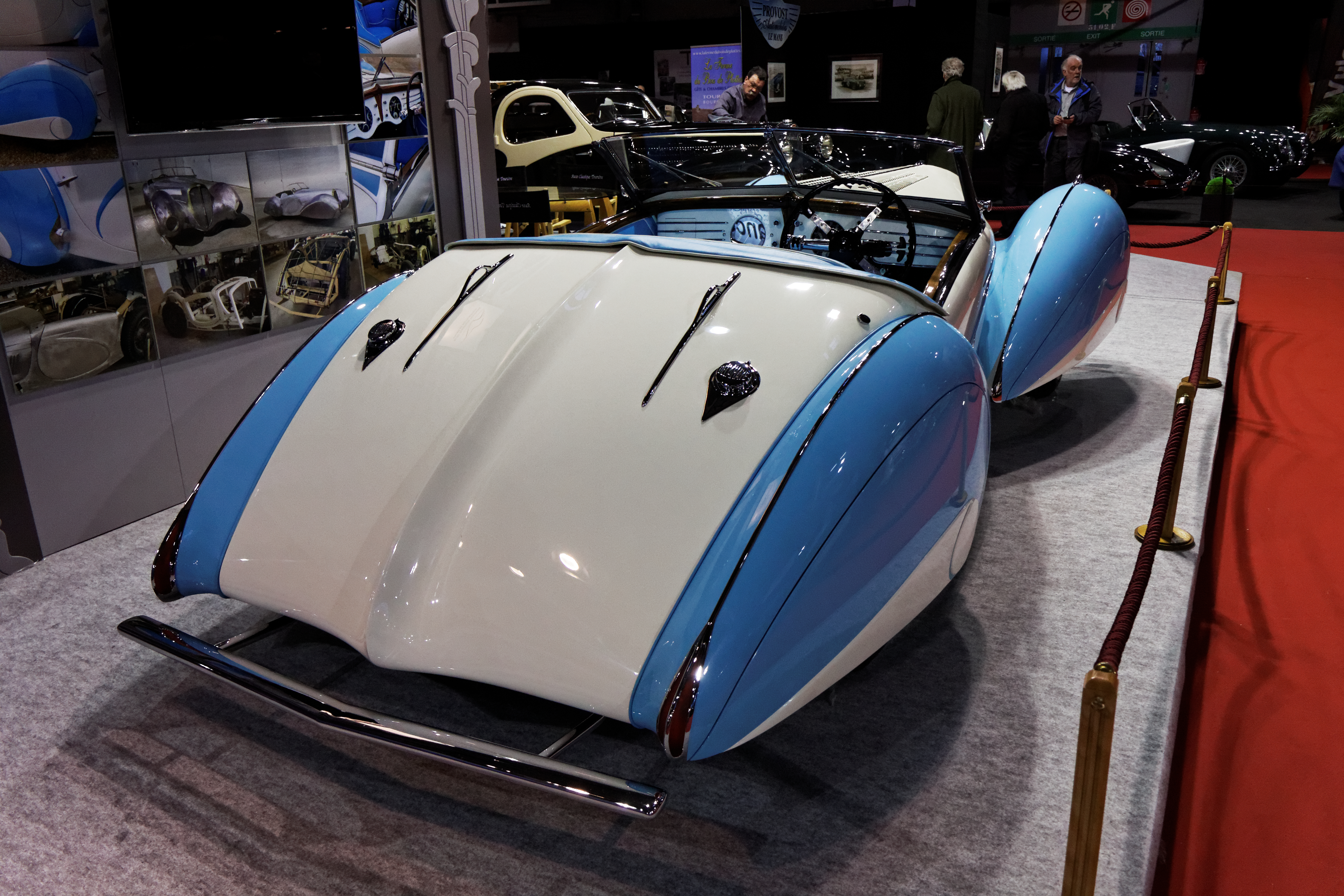
1937 Delahaye Type 135-M roadster body by Figoni & Falaschi

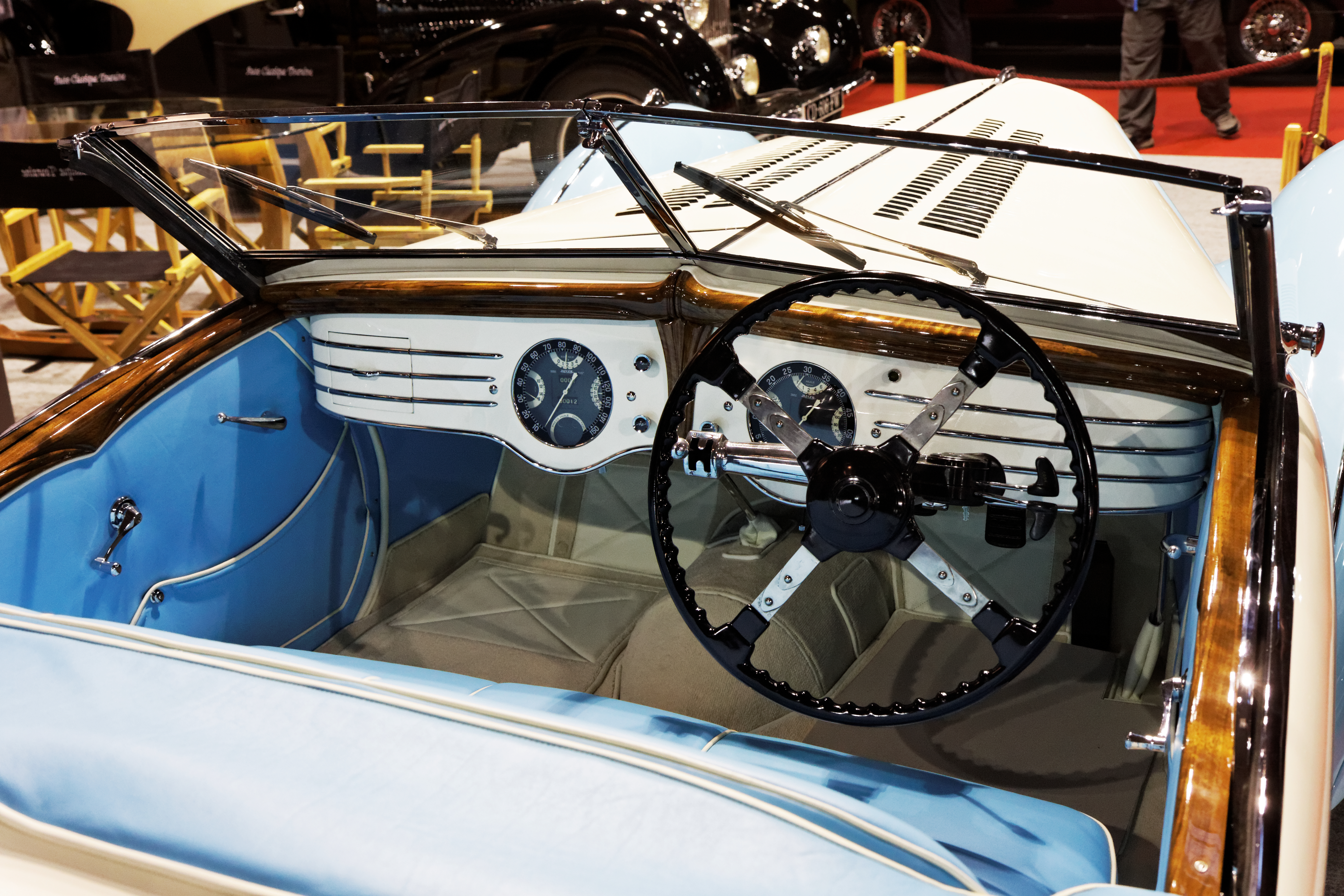
1937 Delahaye Type 135-M roadster body by Figoni & Falaschi interior

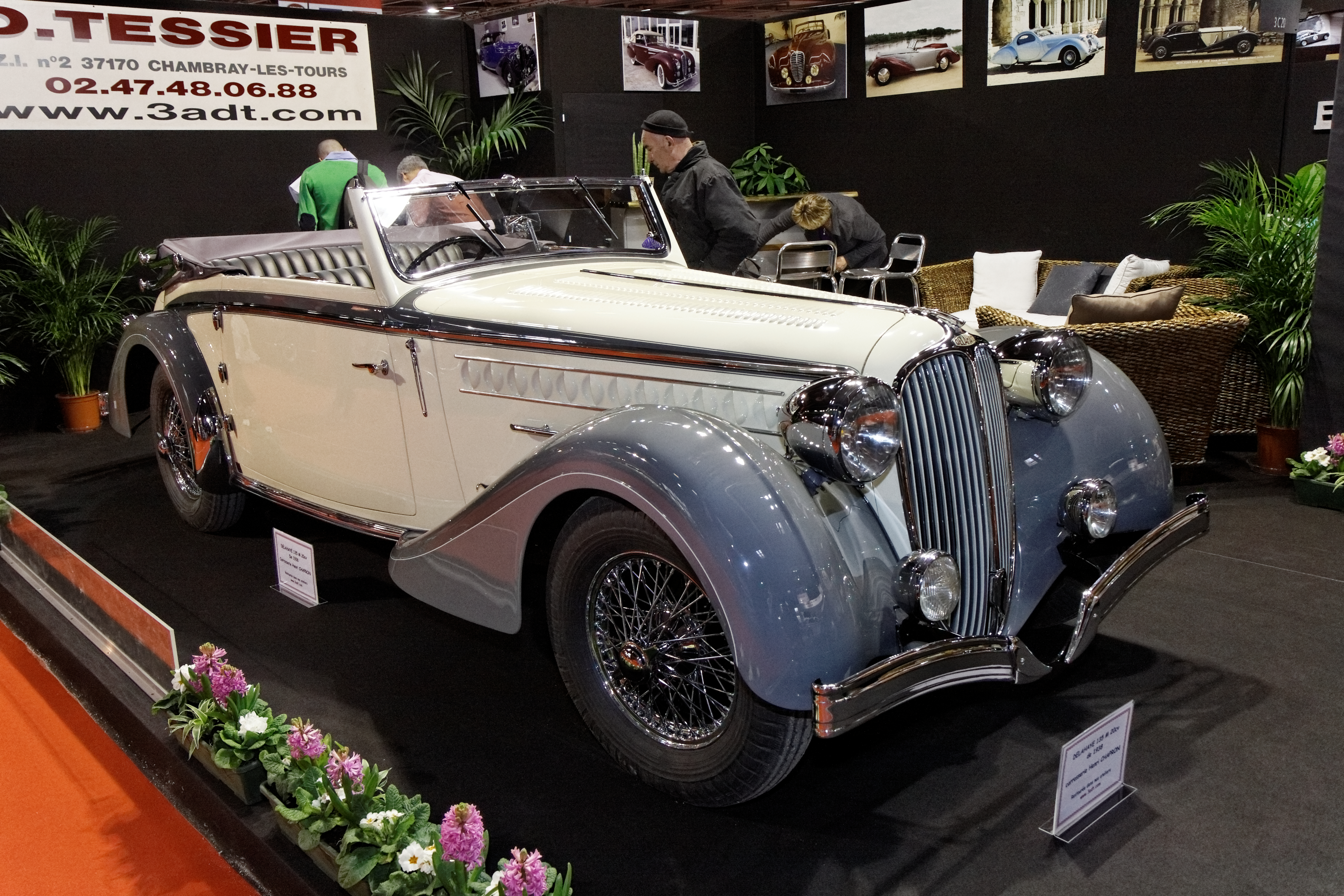
1938 Delahaye 135-M Chapron

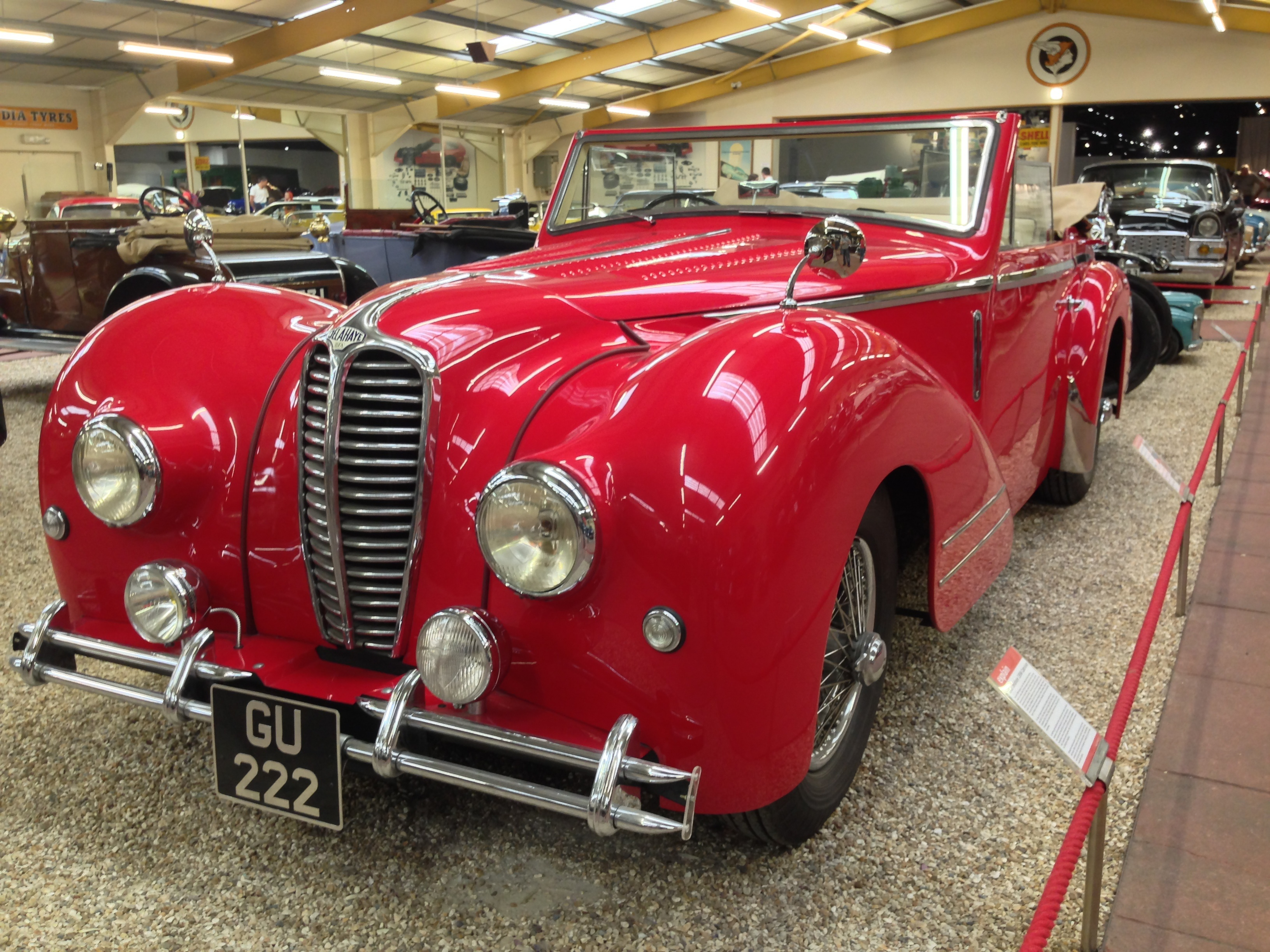
1939 Delahaye Type 135 M Guilloré cabriolet

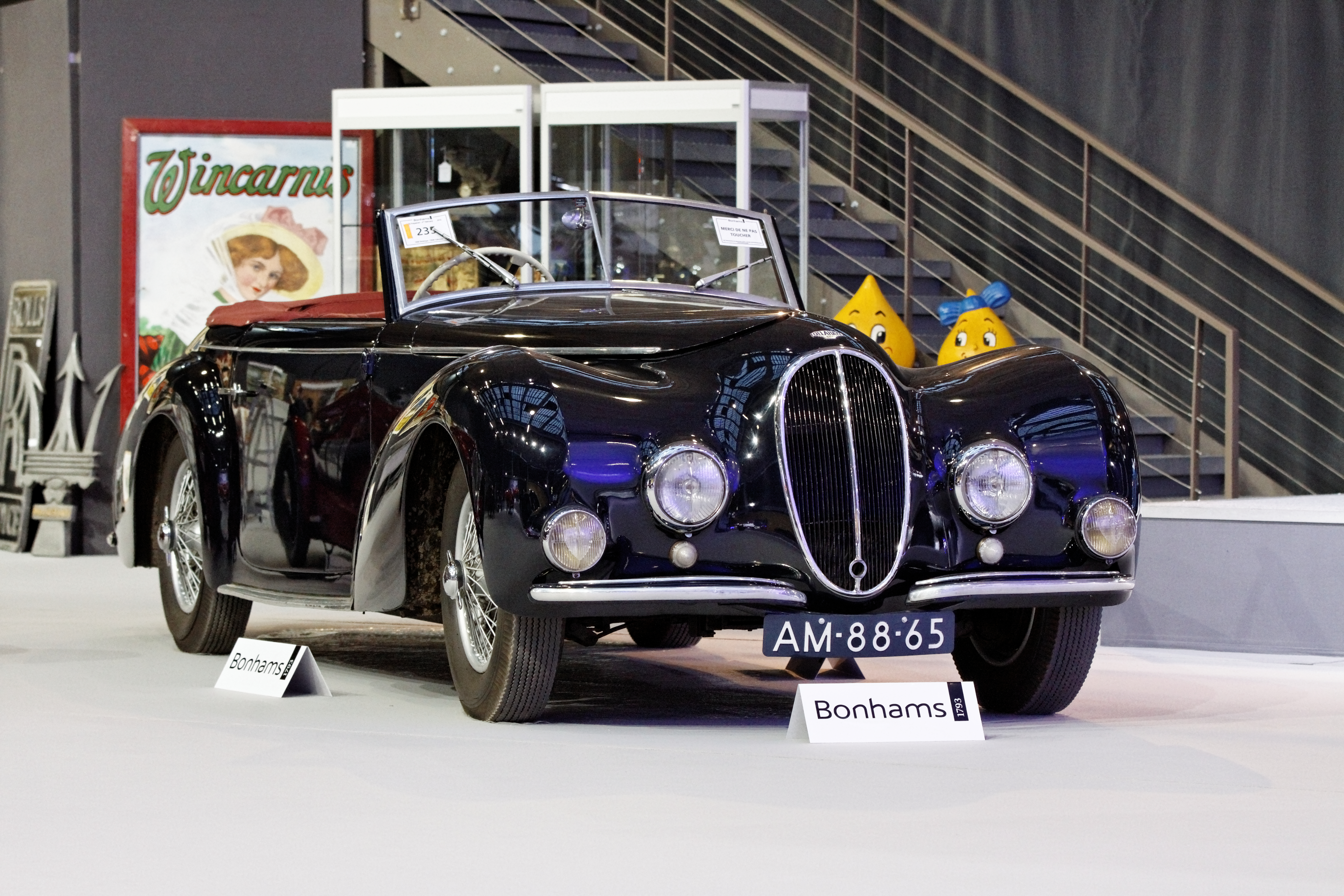
1946 Delahaye Type 135-M Graber cabriolet (chassis 800 269)

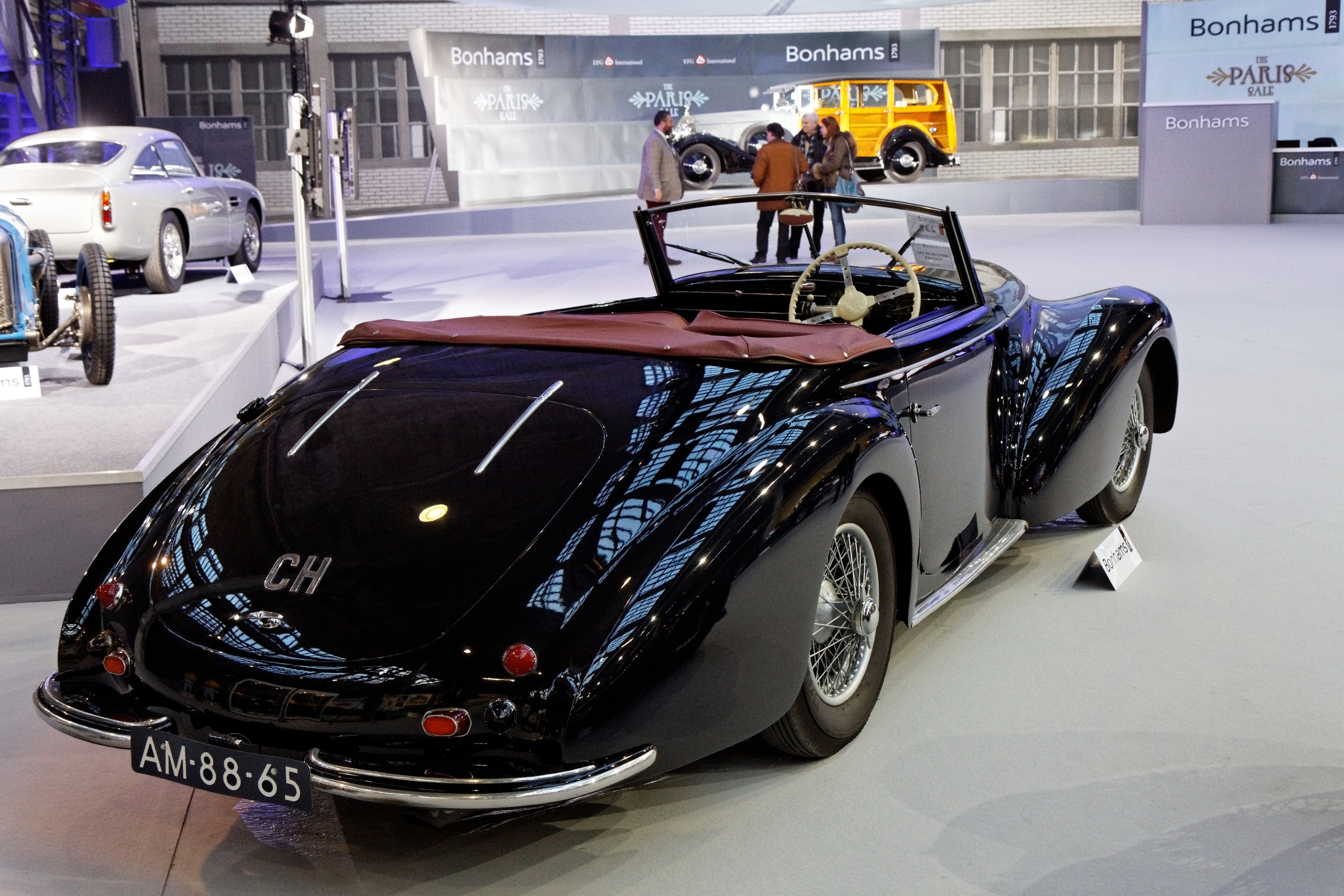
1946 Delahaye Type 135-M Graber cabriolet (chassis 800 269)

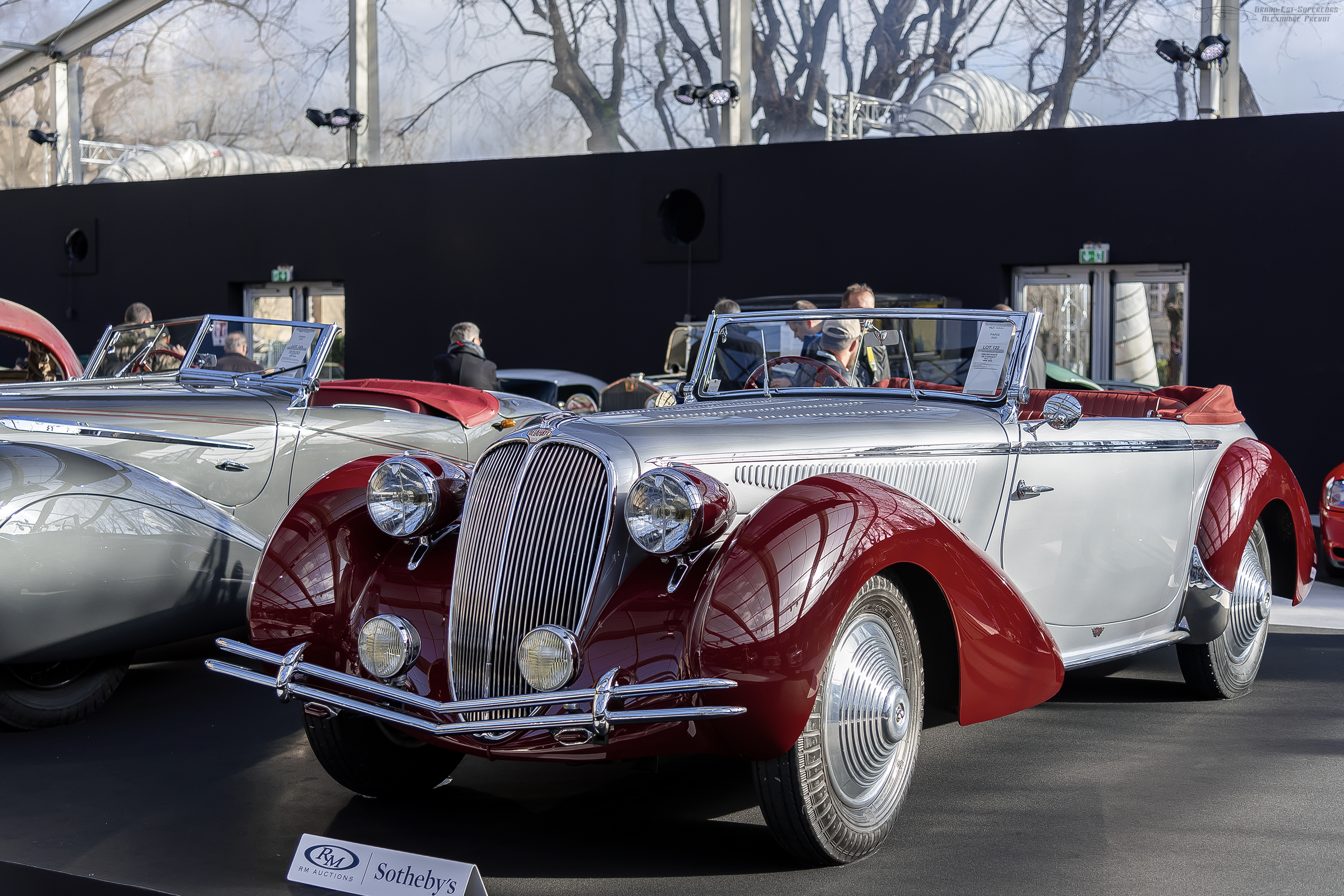
1946 Delahaye Type 135-M Figoni & Falaschi cabriolet (chassis 800 308)

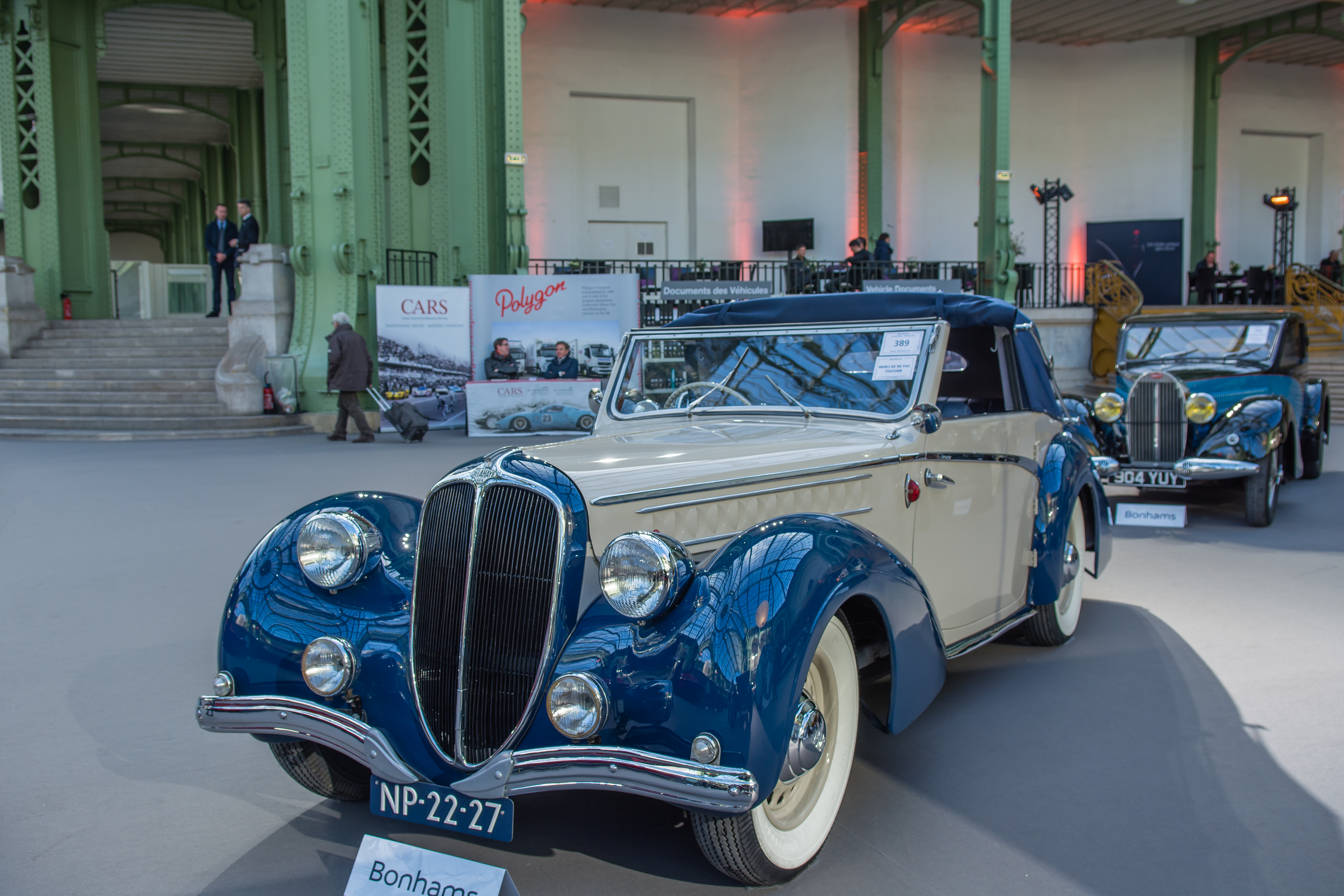
1946 Delahaye Type 135-M Pennock cabriolet (chassis 800 424)

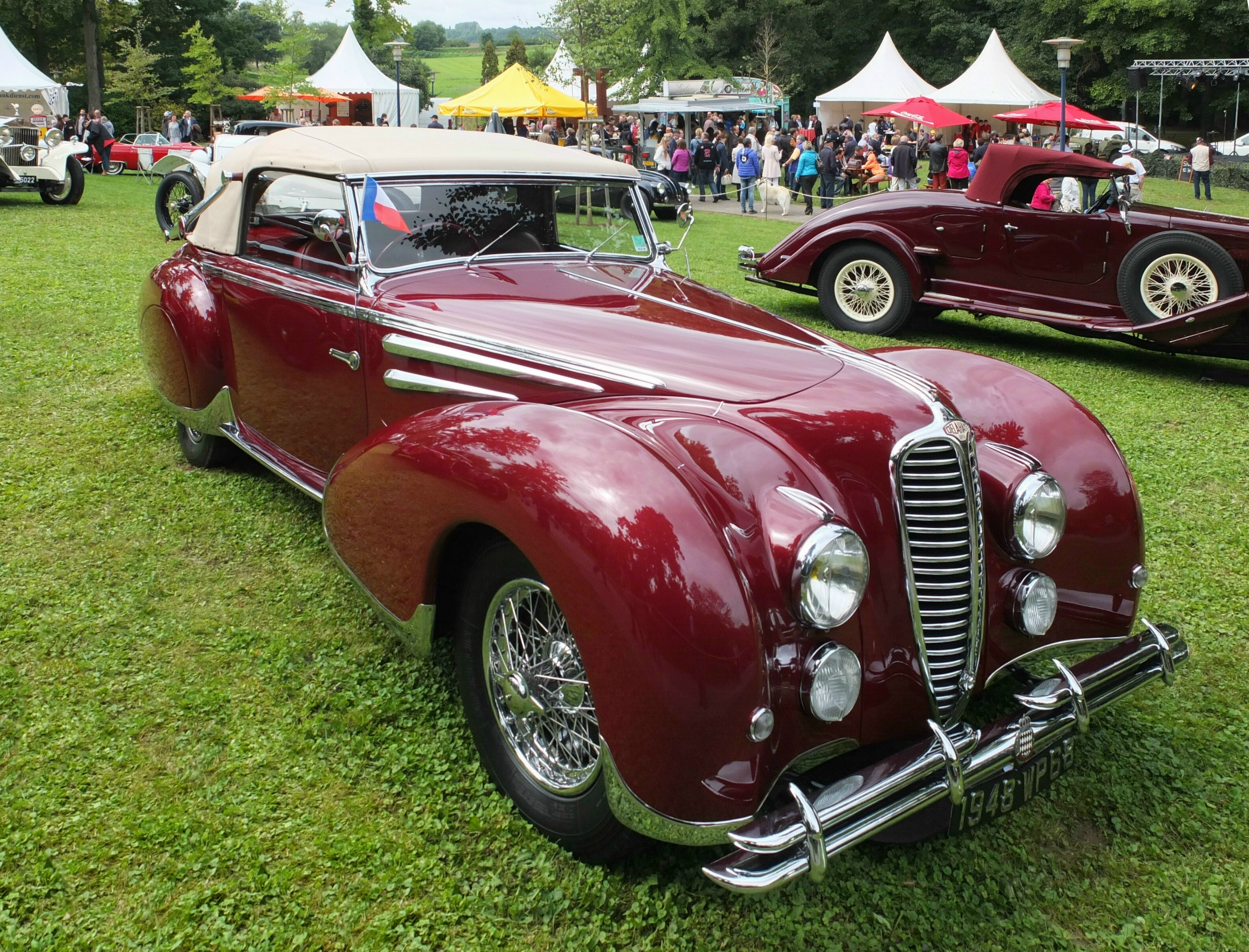
1948 Delahaye Type 135-M Figoni & Falaschi cabriolet "El Glaoui" (chassis 801 189)

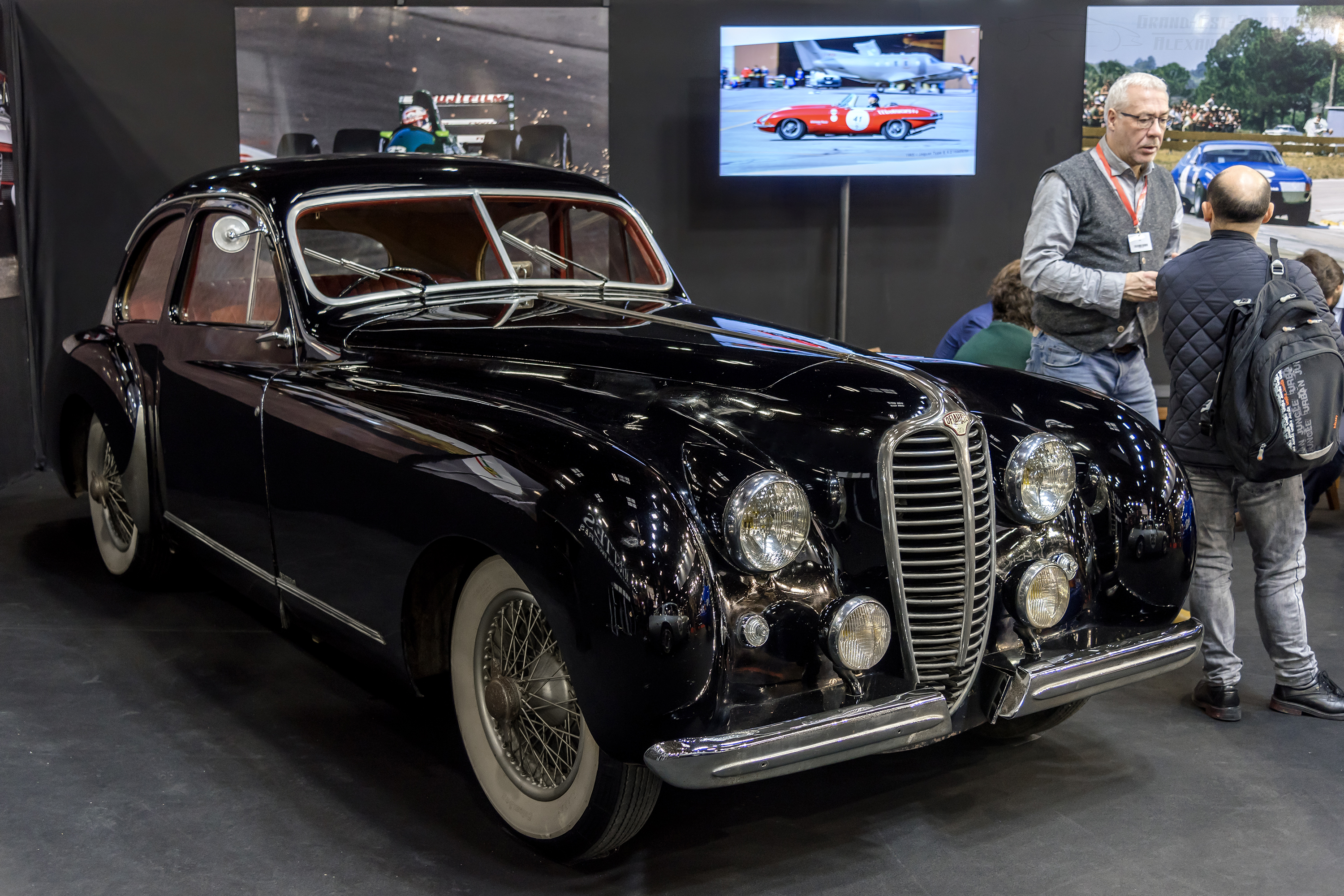
1949 135-M Coach Gascogne

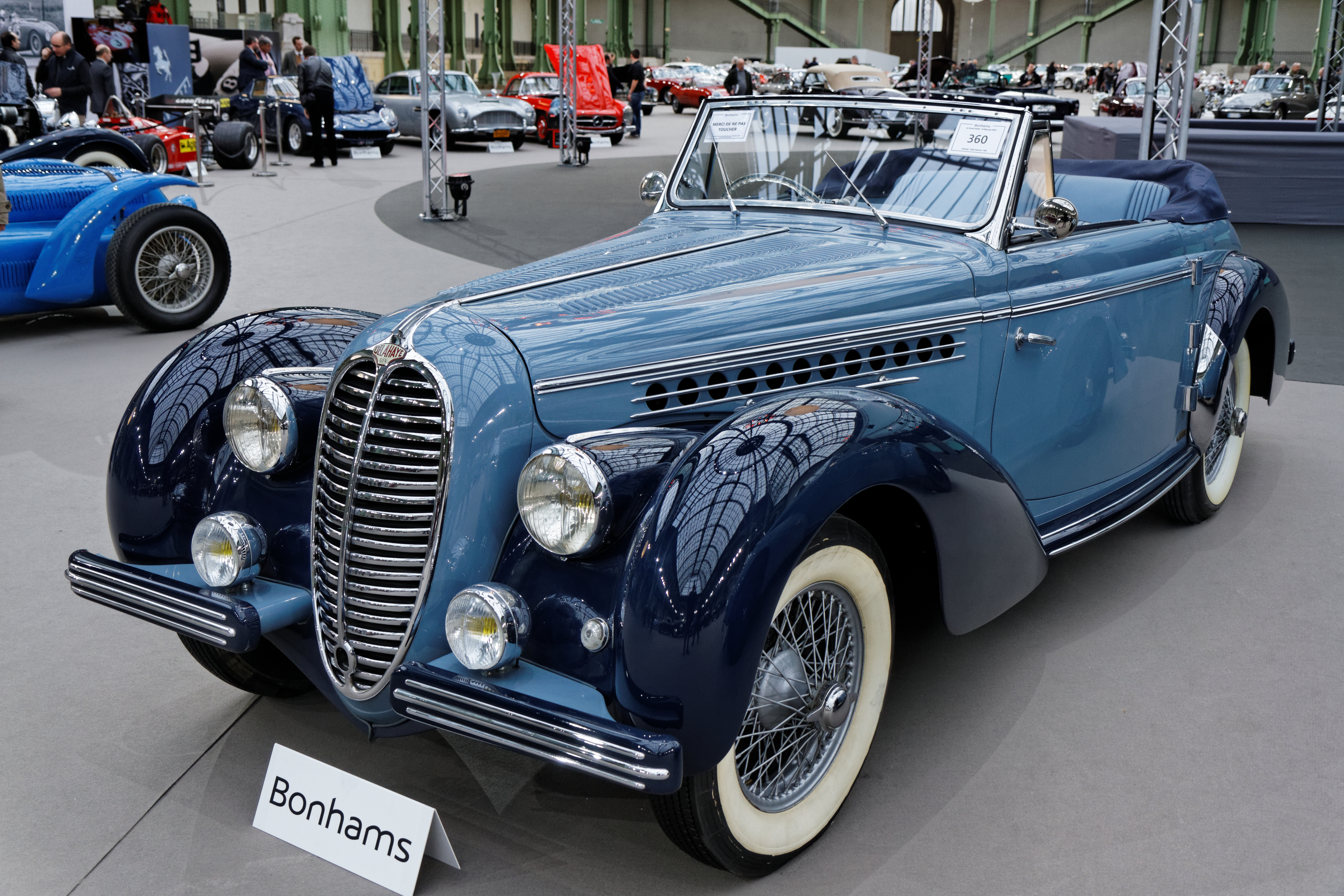
1949 Delahaye 135-M Cabriolet

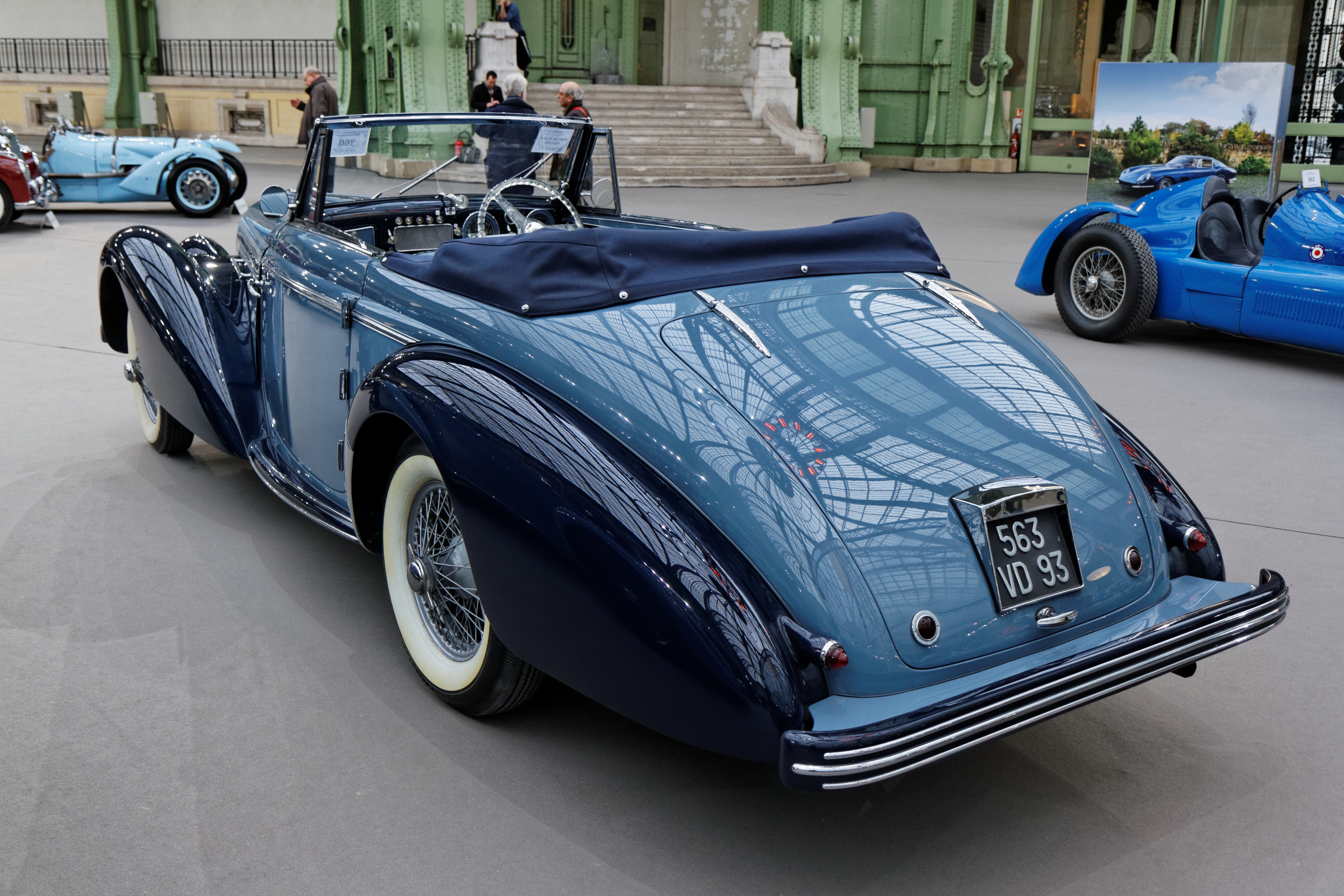
1949 Delahaye 135-M Cabriolet

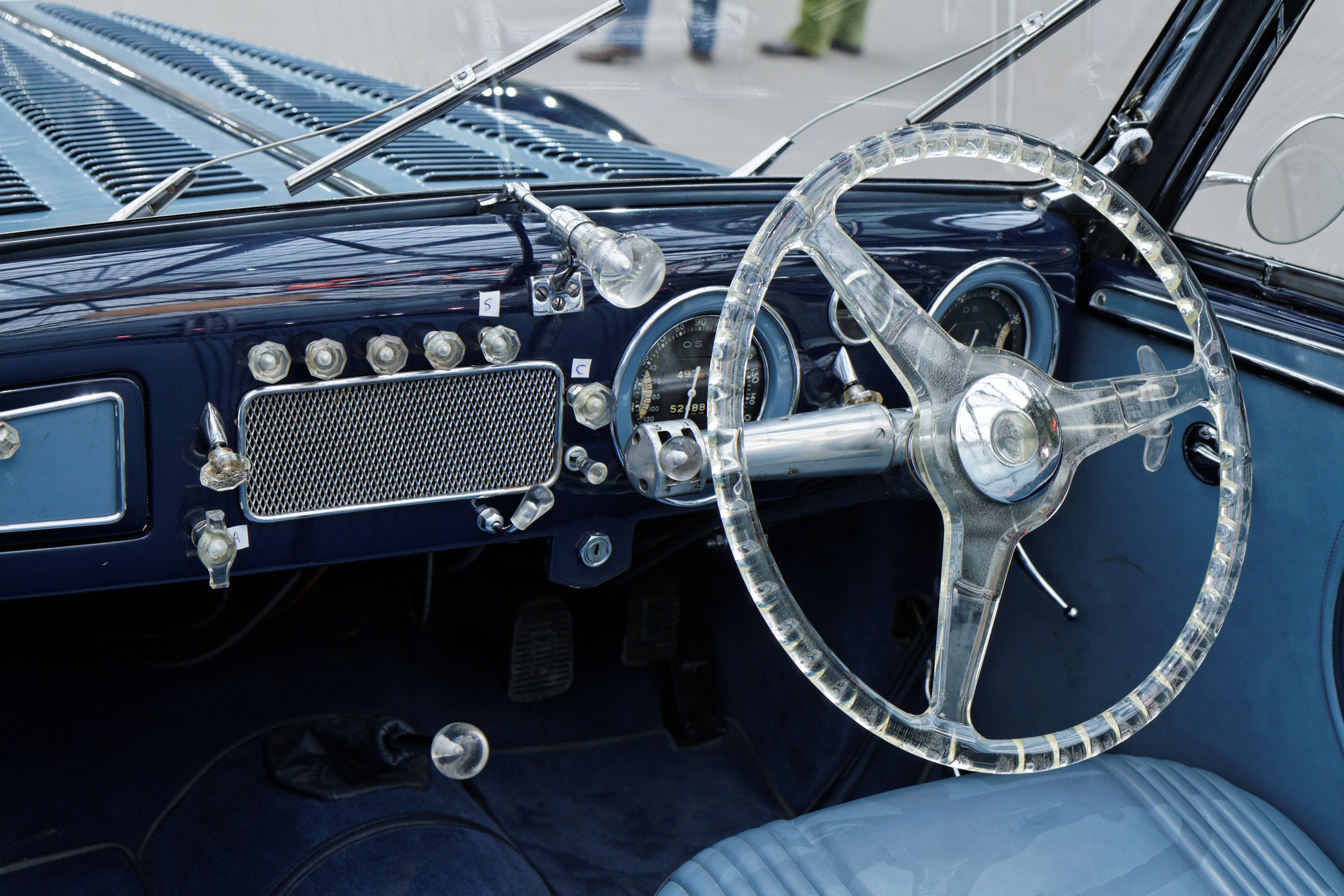
1949 Delahaye 135-M Cabriolet interior

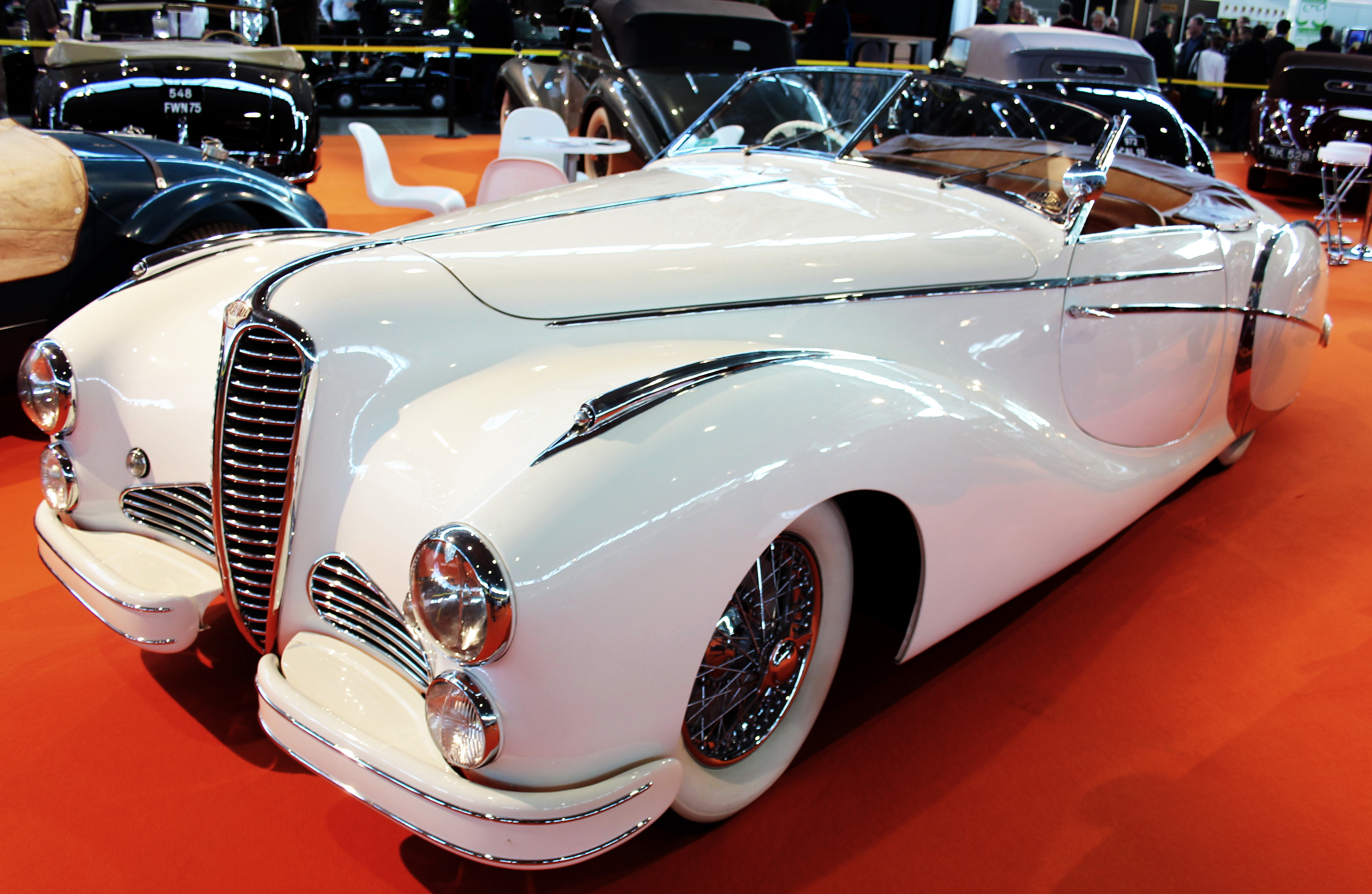
1949 Delahaye Type 135-M Saoutchick cabriolet (chassis 801 424)

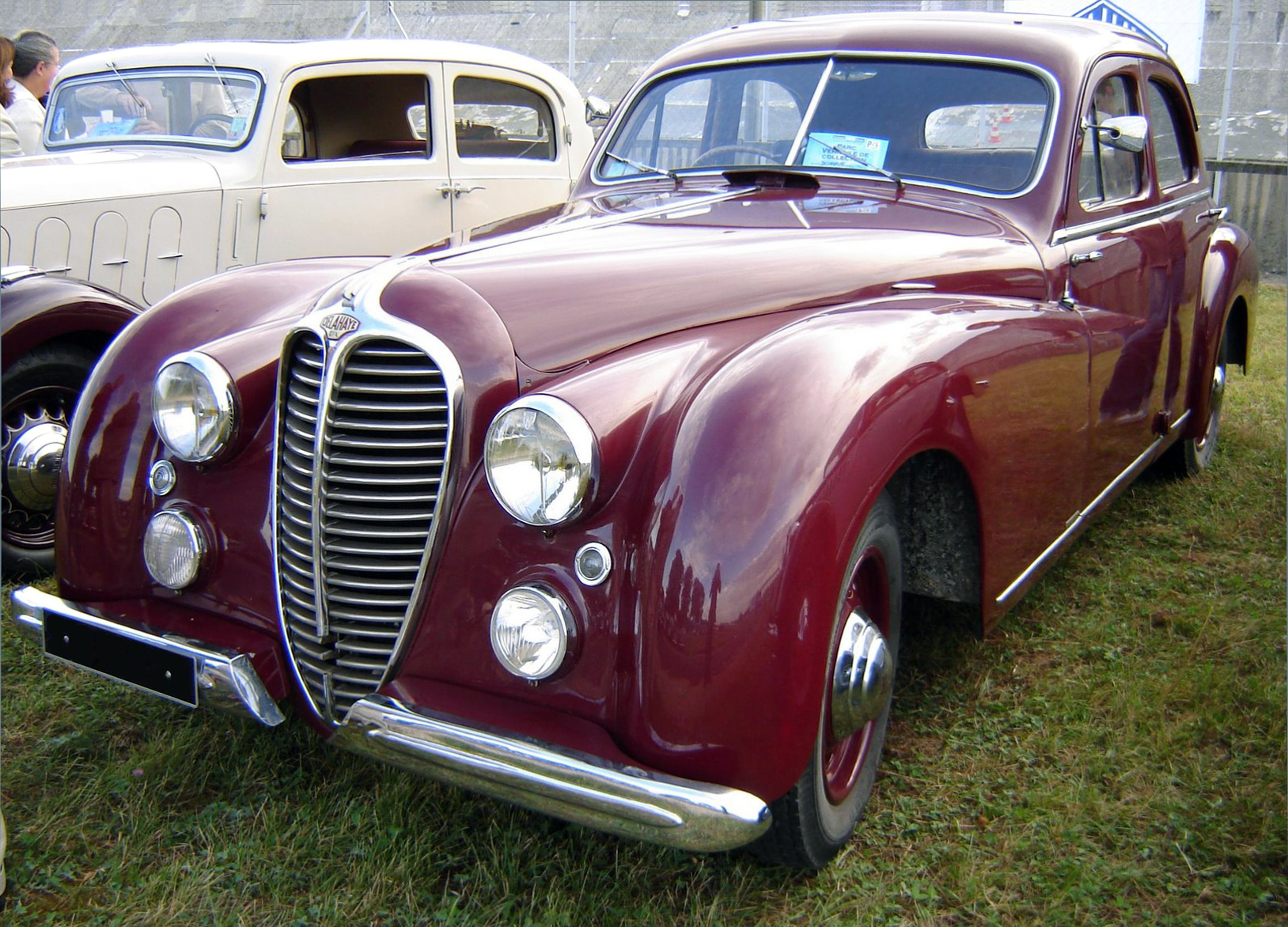
1949 148L with four-door berline bodywork by Letourneur et Marchand

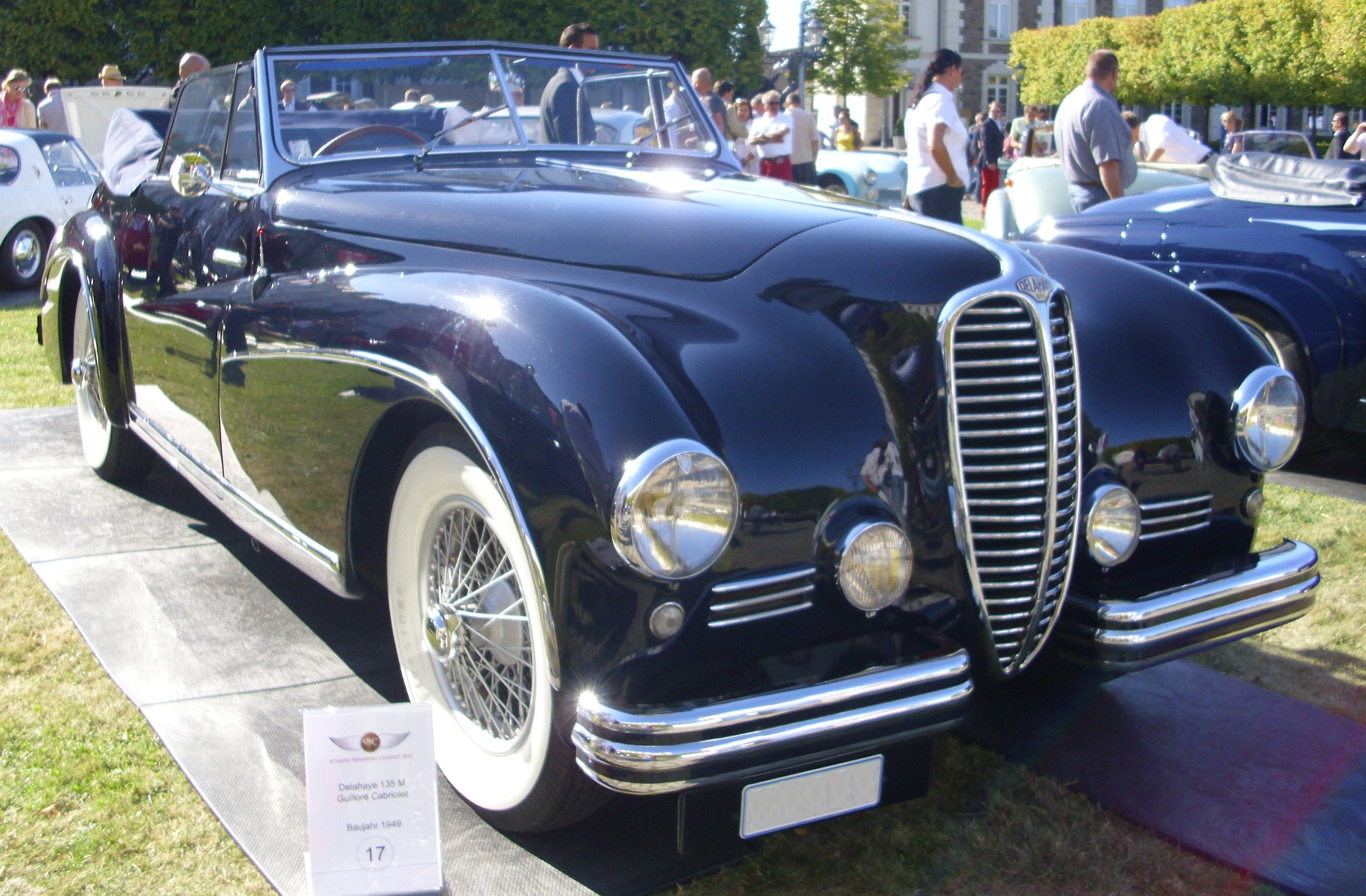
1950 Delahaye Type 135-M Guilloré cabriolet "Atlas" 1950 (chassis 801636)

==== 168 ====
Presented in December 1938 and built until the outbreak of war in 1940, the Type 168 used the 148L's chassis and engine (engine code 148N) in Renault Viva Grand Sport bodywork. Wheelbase remained 315 cm while the use of artillery wheels rather than spoked items meant minor differences in track. This curious hybrid was the result of an effort by Renault to steal in on Delahaye's lucrative near monopoly on fire vehicles: after a complaint by Delahaye, Renault relinquished contracts it had gained, but in return Delahaye had to agree to purchase a number of Viva Grand Sport bodyshells. In an effort to limit the market of this cuckoo's egg, thus limiting the number of bodyshells it had to purchase from Renault, Delahaye chose to equip it with the unpopular Wilson preselector (even though the marketing material referred to the Cotal version). This succeeded very well, and with the war putting a stop to car production, no more than thirty were supposedly built. Strong, wide, and fast, like their Viva Grand Sport half sisters, the 168s proved popular with the army. Many were equipped to run on gazogène during the war and very few (if any) remain.

=== 135MS ===
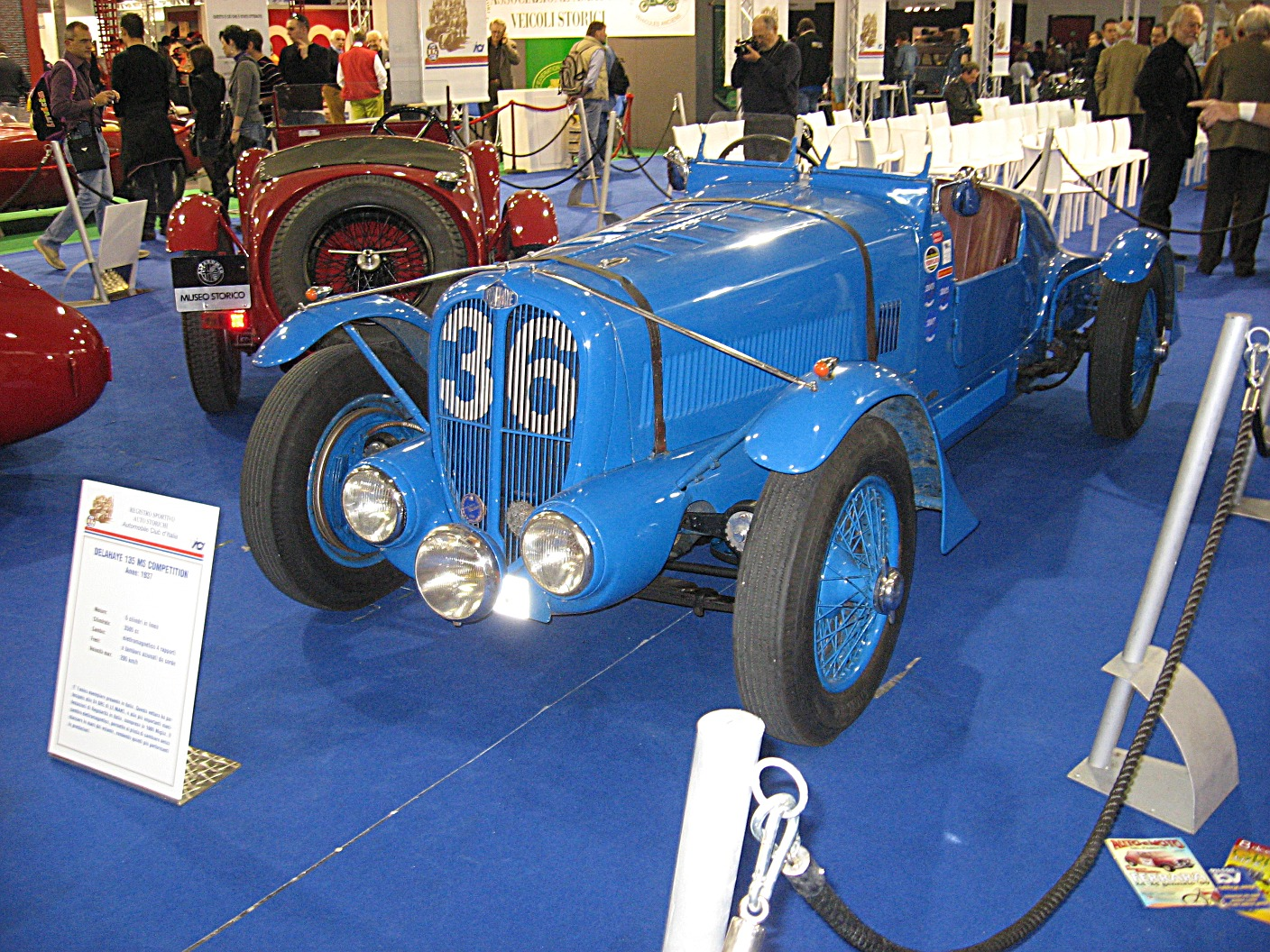
Short wheelbase 135MS (1937)

An even sportier version, the 135MS, soon followed; 120–145 hp were available, with competition versions offering over 160 hp. The 135MS was the version most commonly seen in competition, and continued to be available until 1954, when new owners Hotchkiss finally called a halt. The MS had the 2.95 m wheelbase, but competition models sat on a shortened 2.70 m chassis.

The Type 235, a rebodied 135MS with ponton-style design by Philippe Charbonneaux, appeared in 1951.

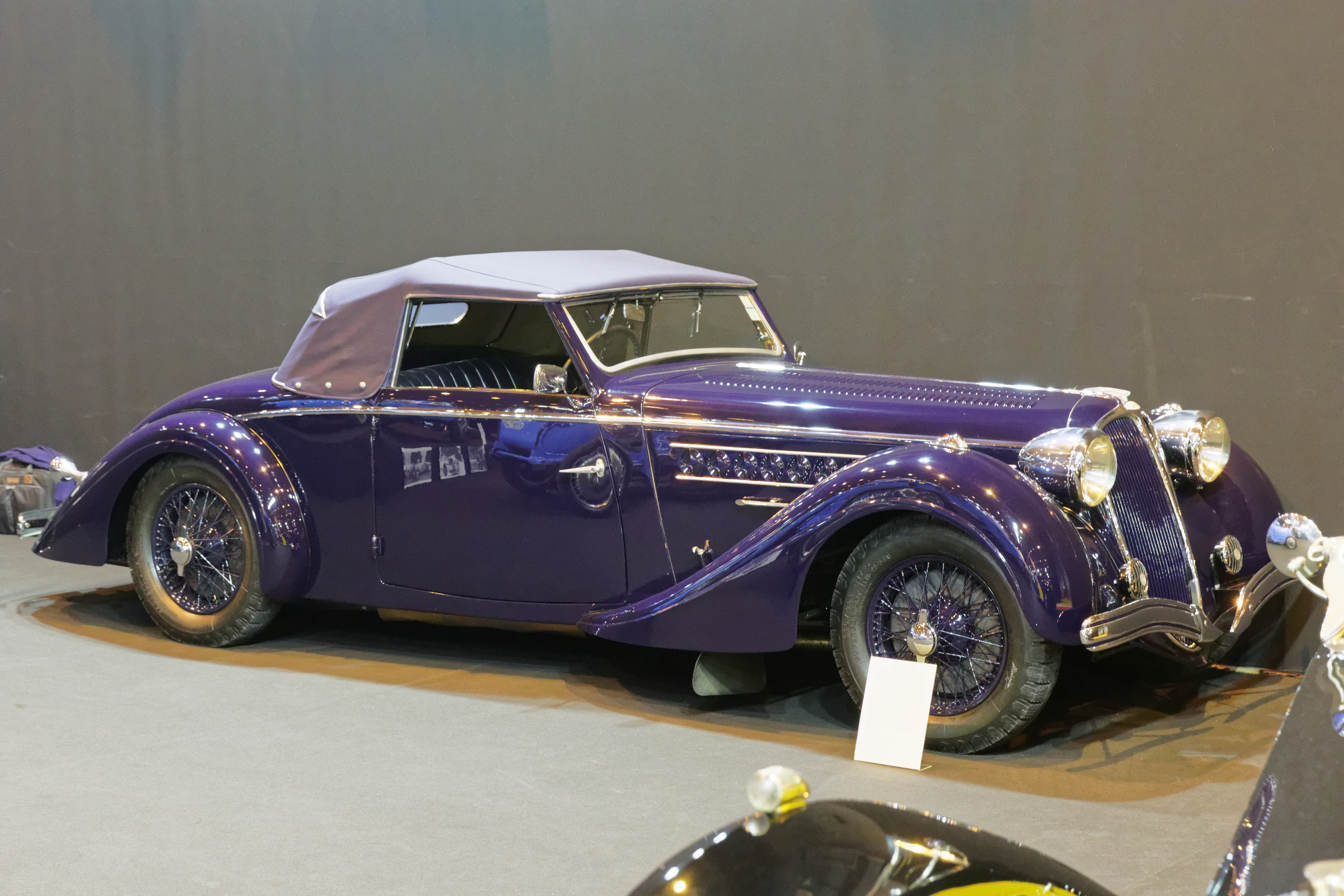
1937 Delahaye Type 135-MS Chapron cabriolet (chassis 47 538)

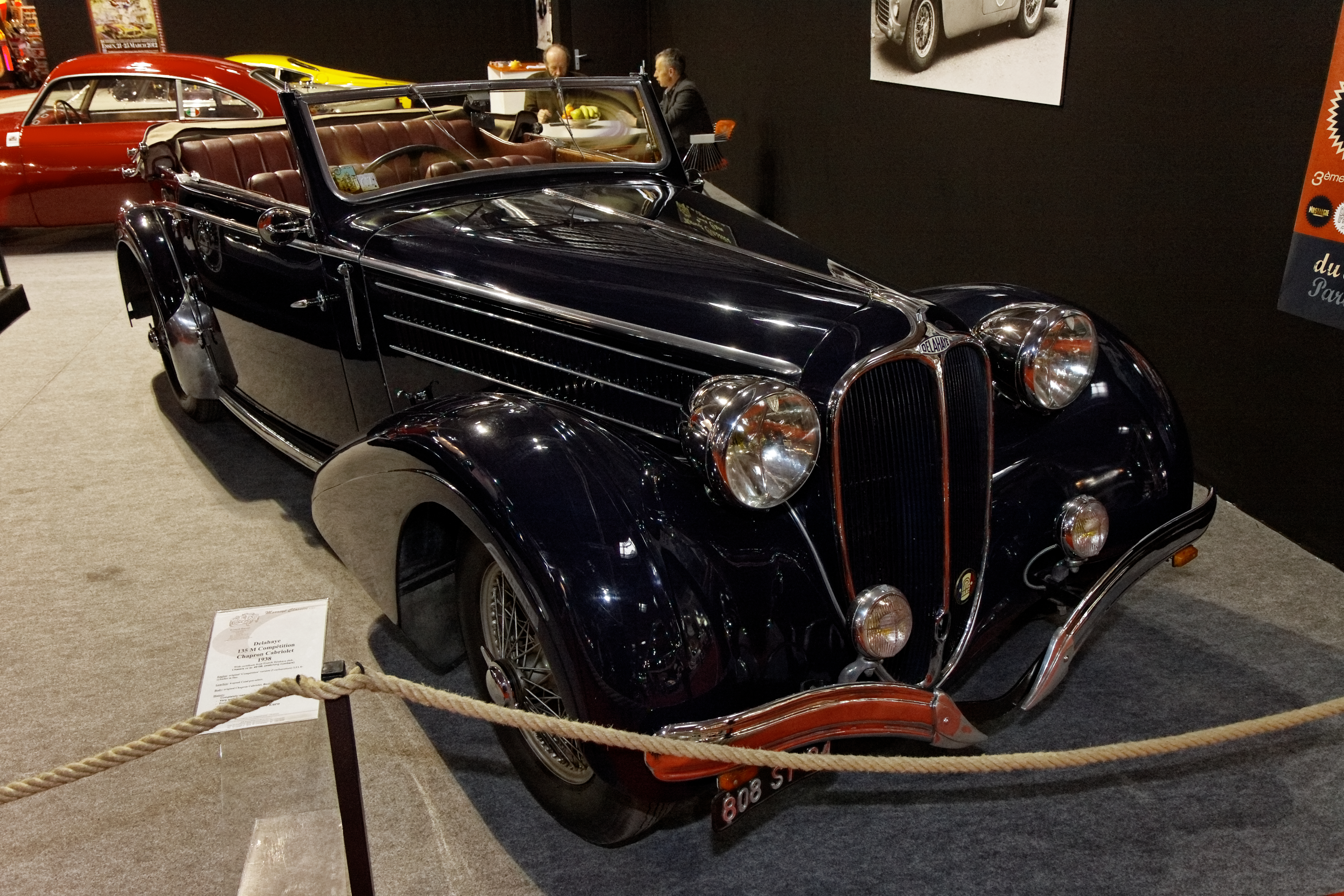
1938 Delahaye 135-MS Compétition Chapron cabriolet (chassis 49 198)

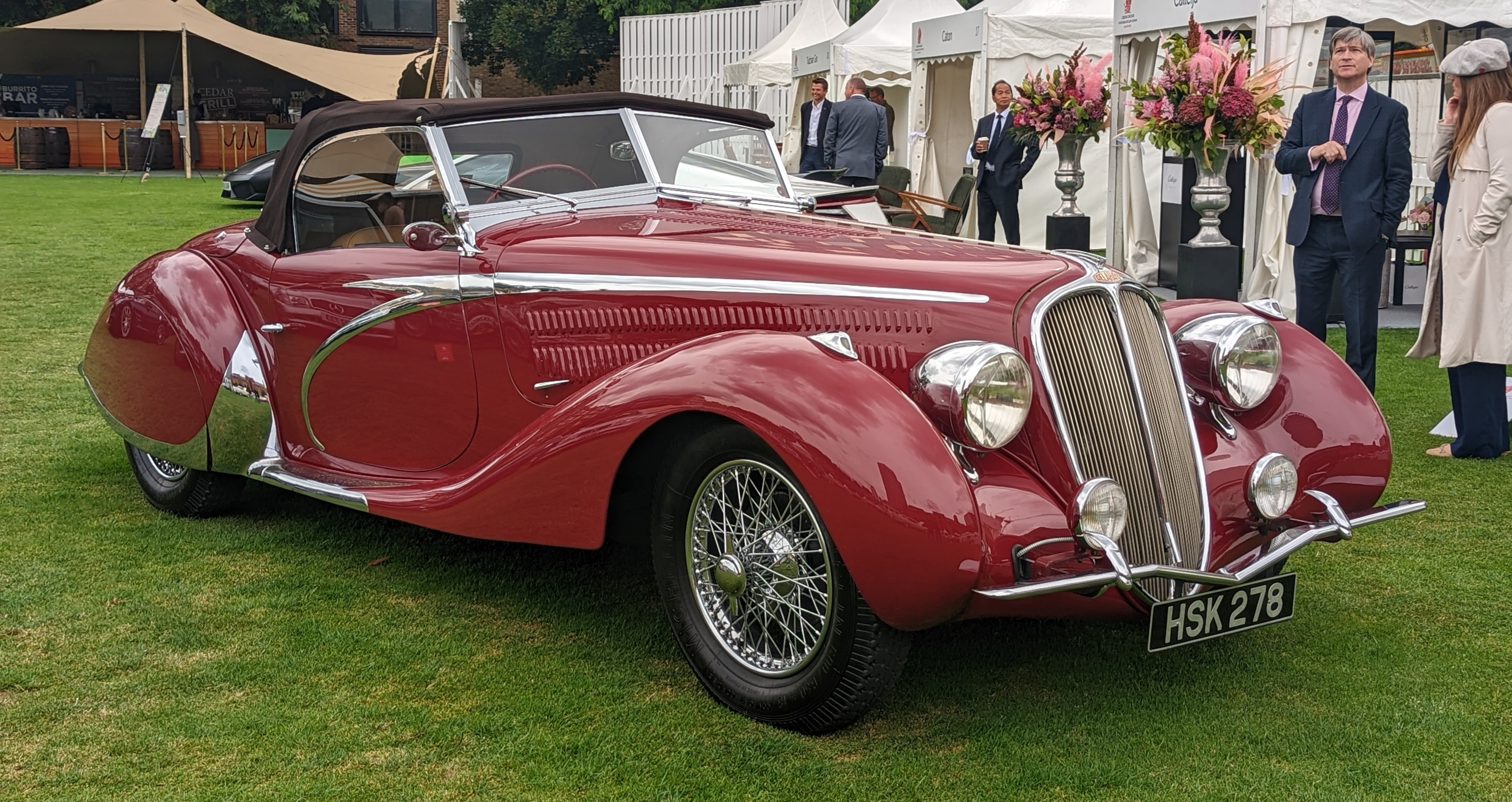
1938 Delahaye 135-MS Figoni & Falaschi cabriolet (chassis 49 346)

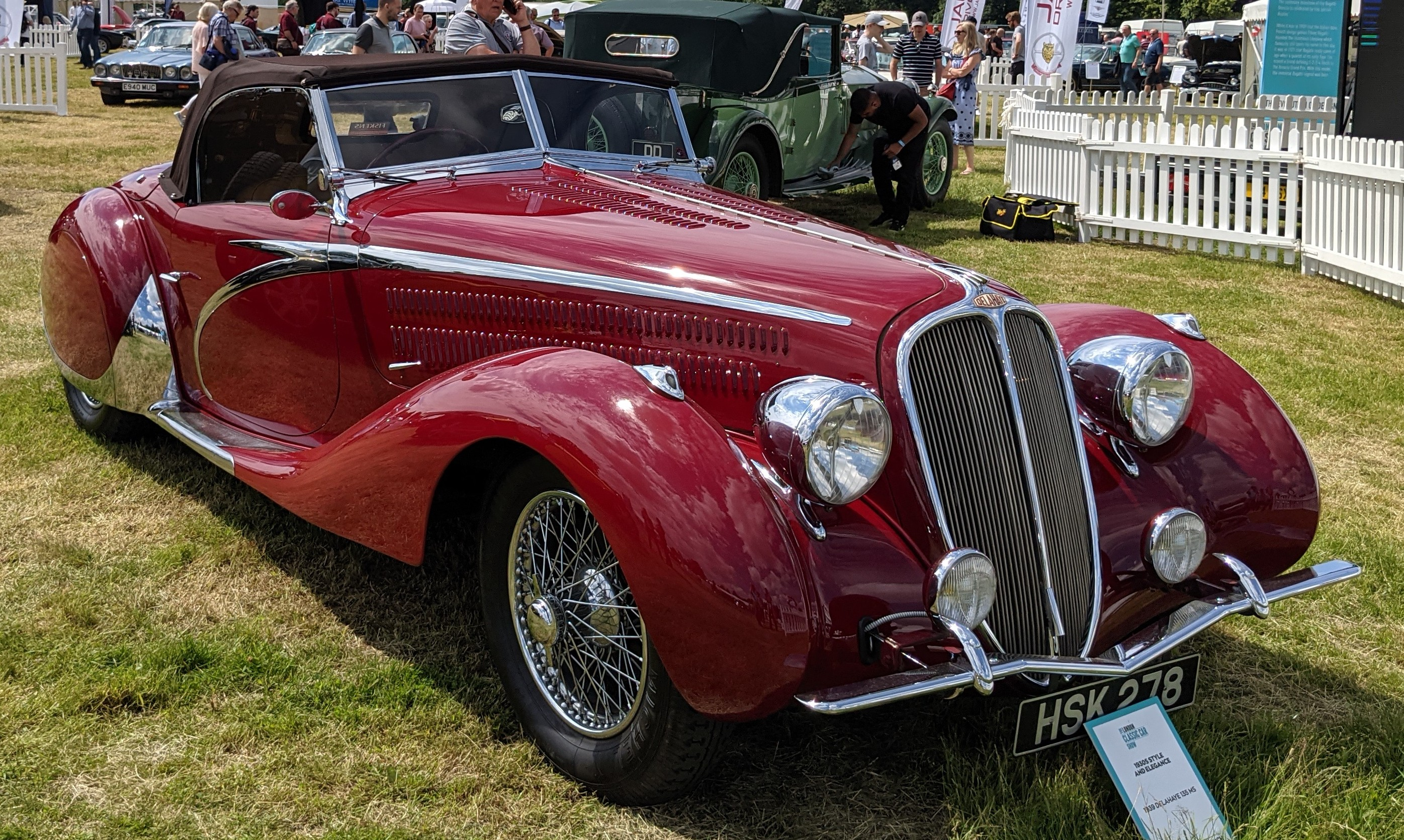
1938 Delahaye 135-MS Figoni & Falaschi cabriolet (chassis 49 346)

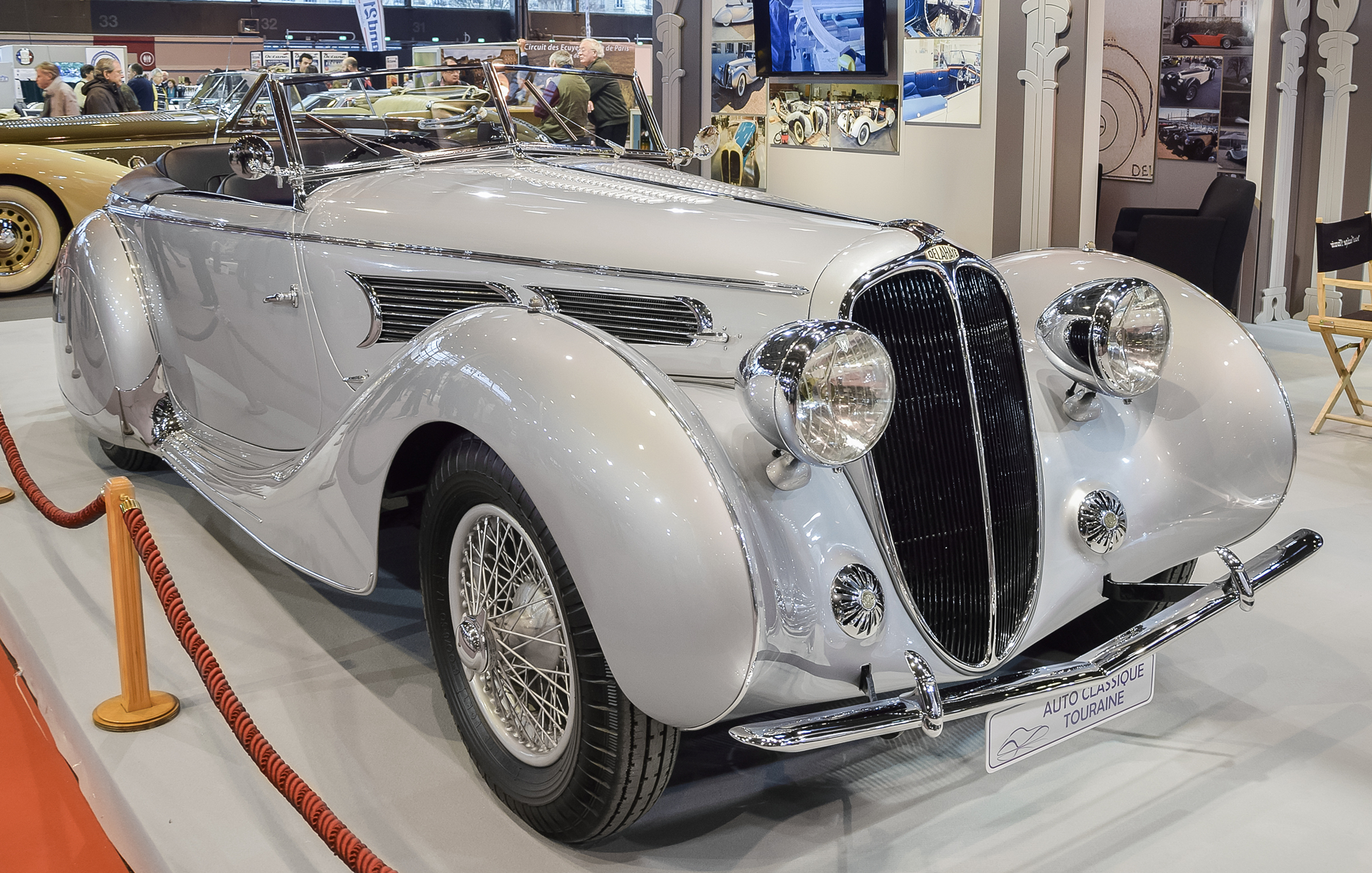
1939 Delahaye 135-MS Cabriolet Figoni & Falaschi

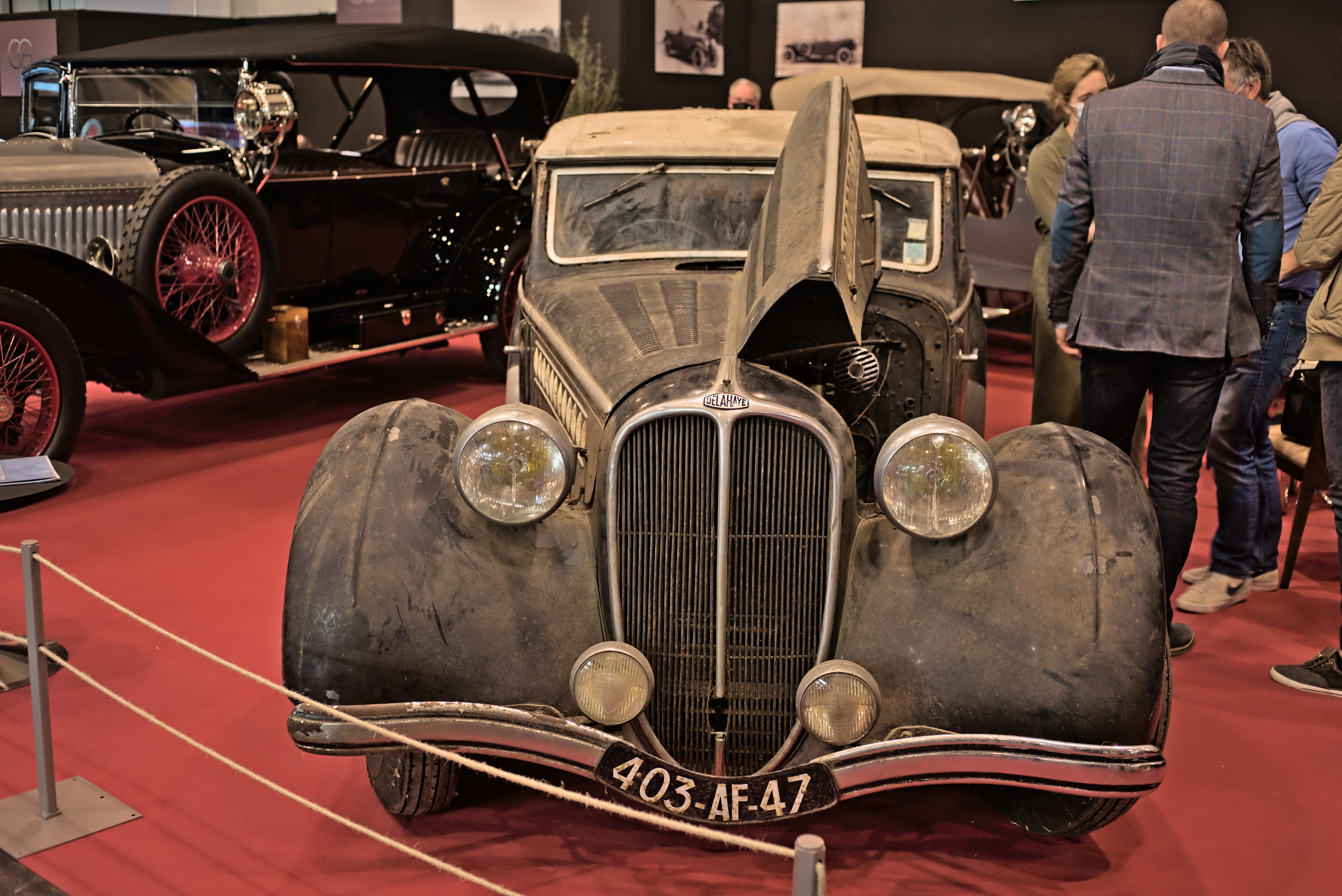
1939 Delahaye 135-MS Chapron unrestored cabriolet (chassis 60 162)

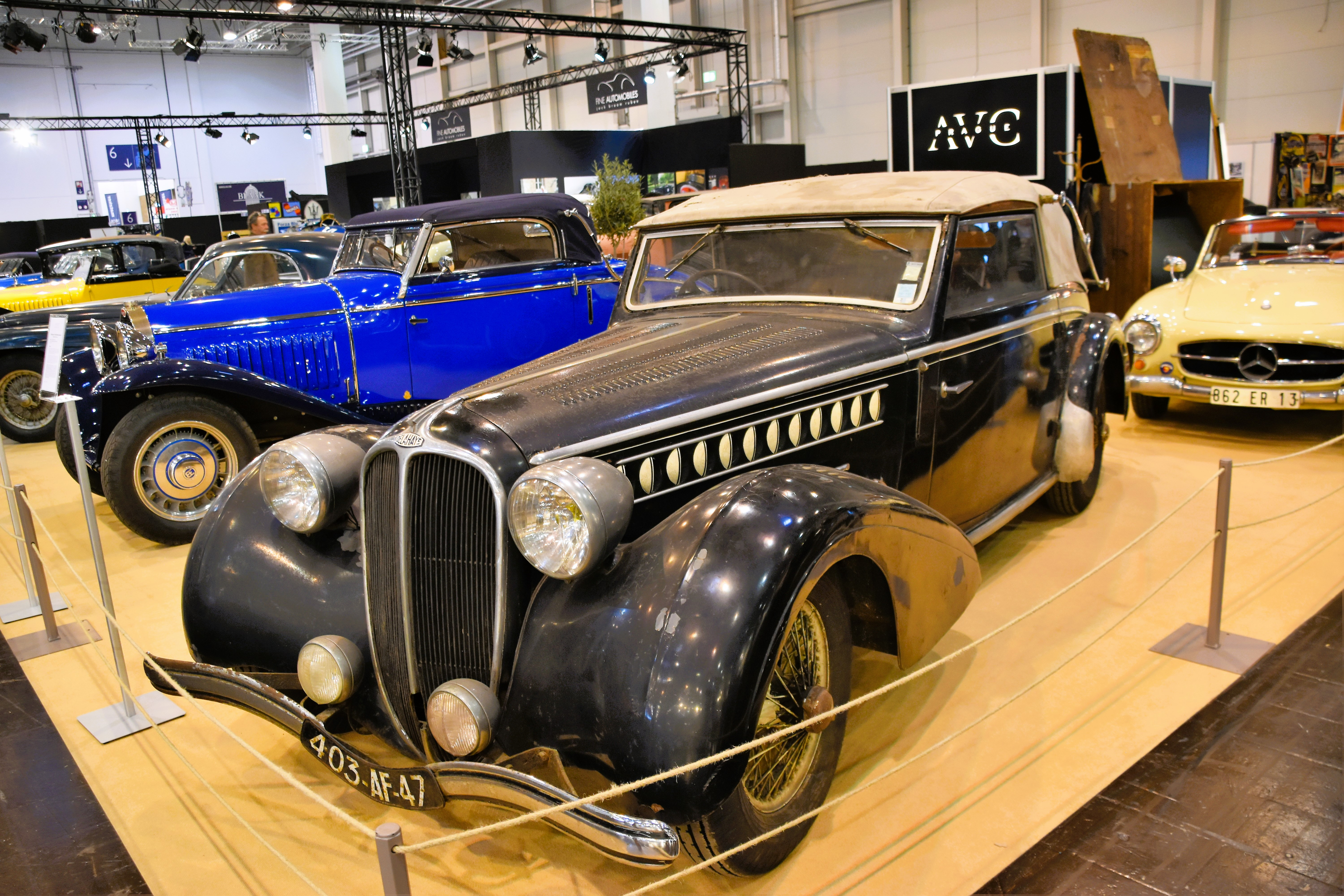
1939 Delahaye 135-MS Chapron unrestored cabriolet (chassis 60 162)

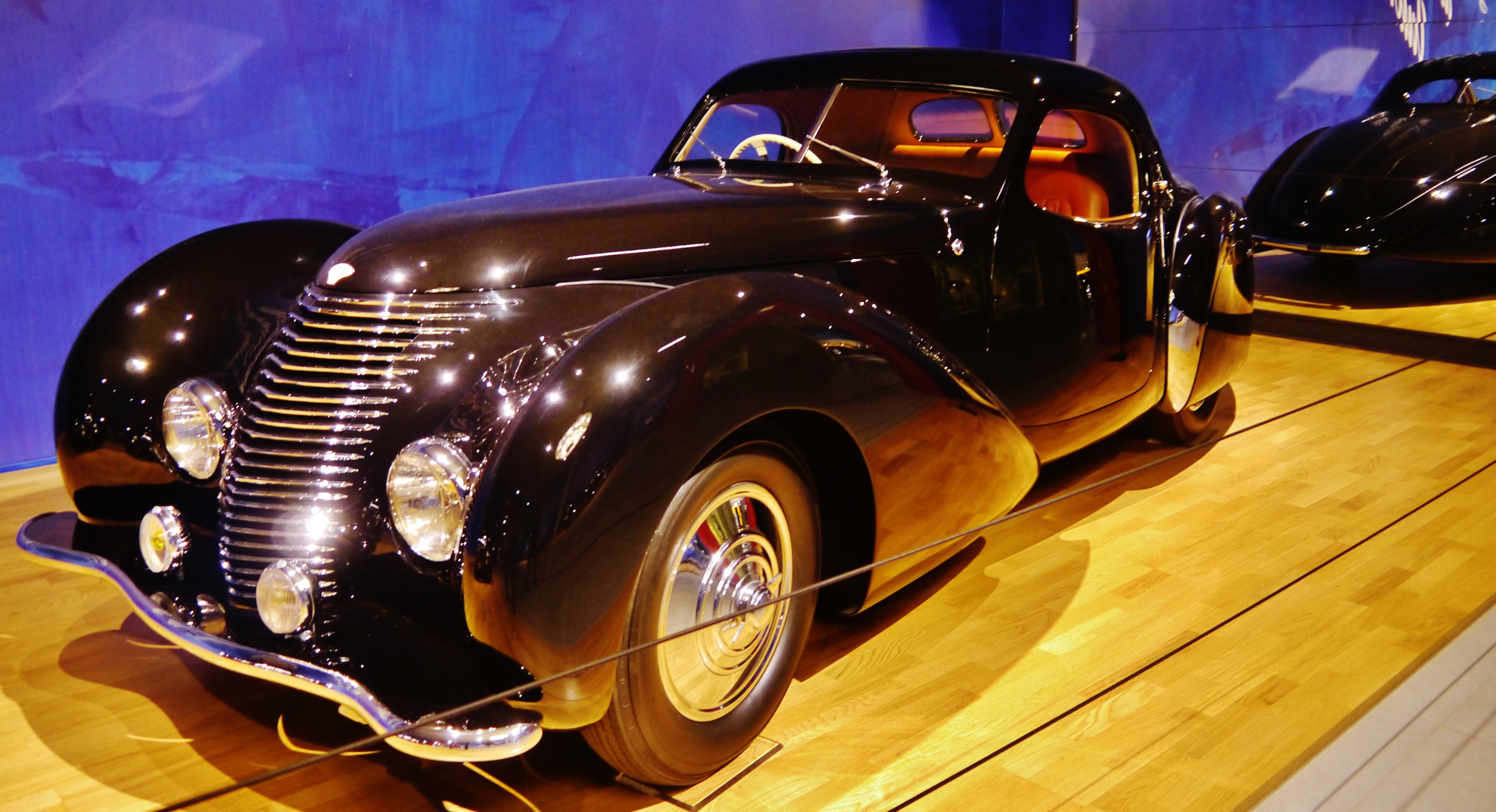
1946 Delahaye 135-MS Coupé Pourtout

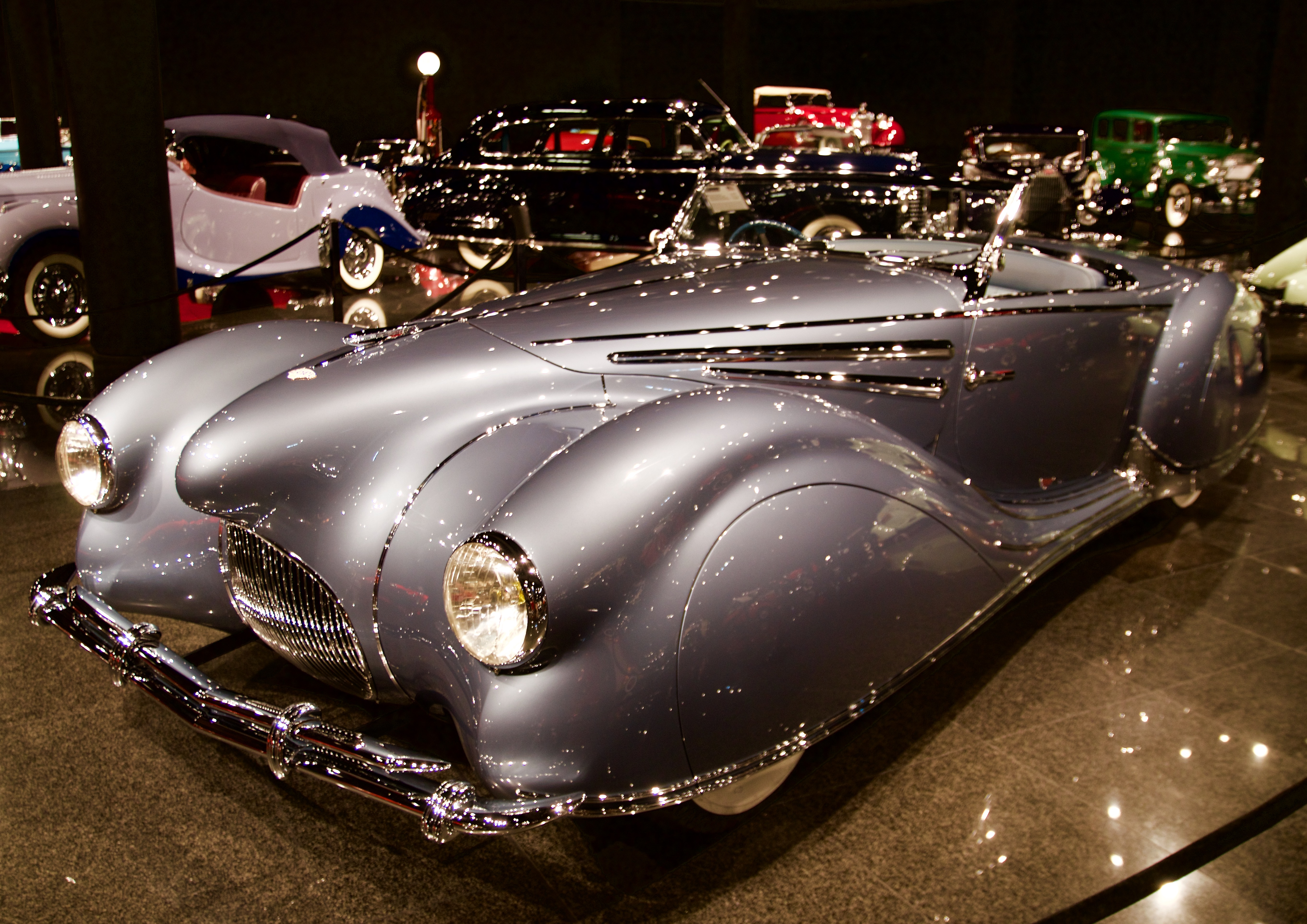
1947 Delahaye 135-MS Figoni & Falaschi "Narval" cabriolet (chassis 800 495)

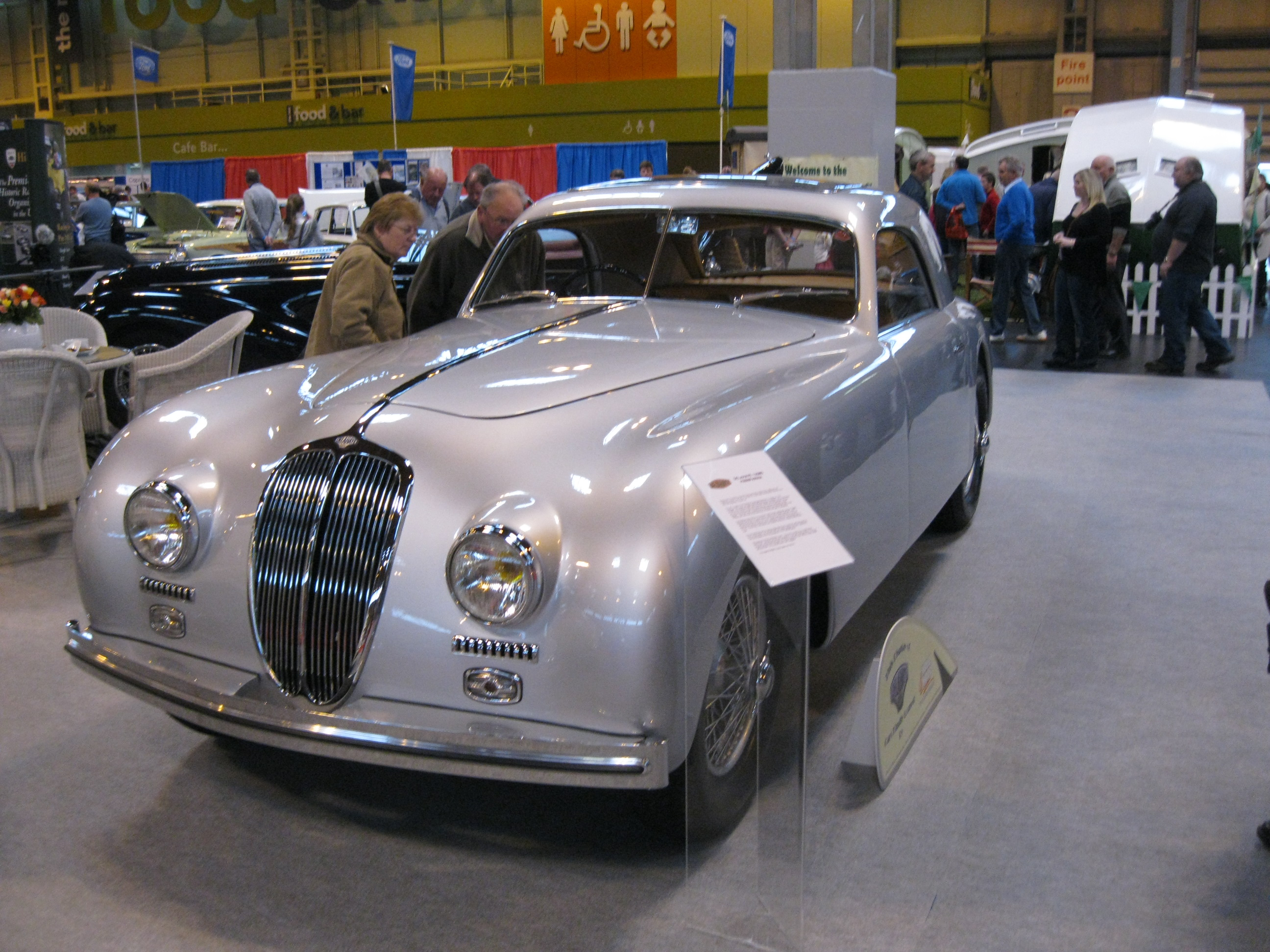
1947 Delahaye 135-MS Pininfarina coupe (chassis 800 697)

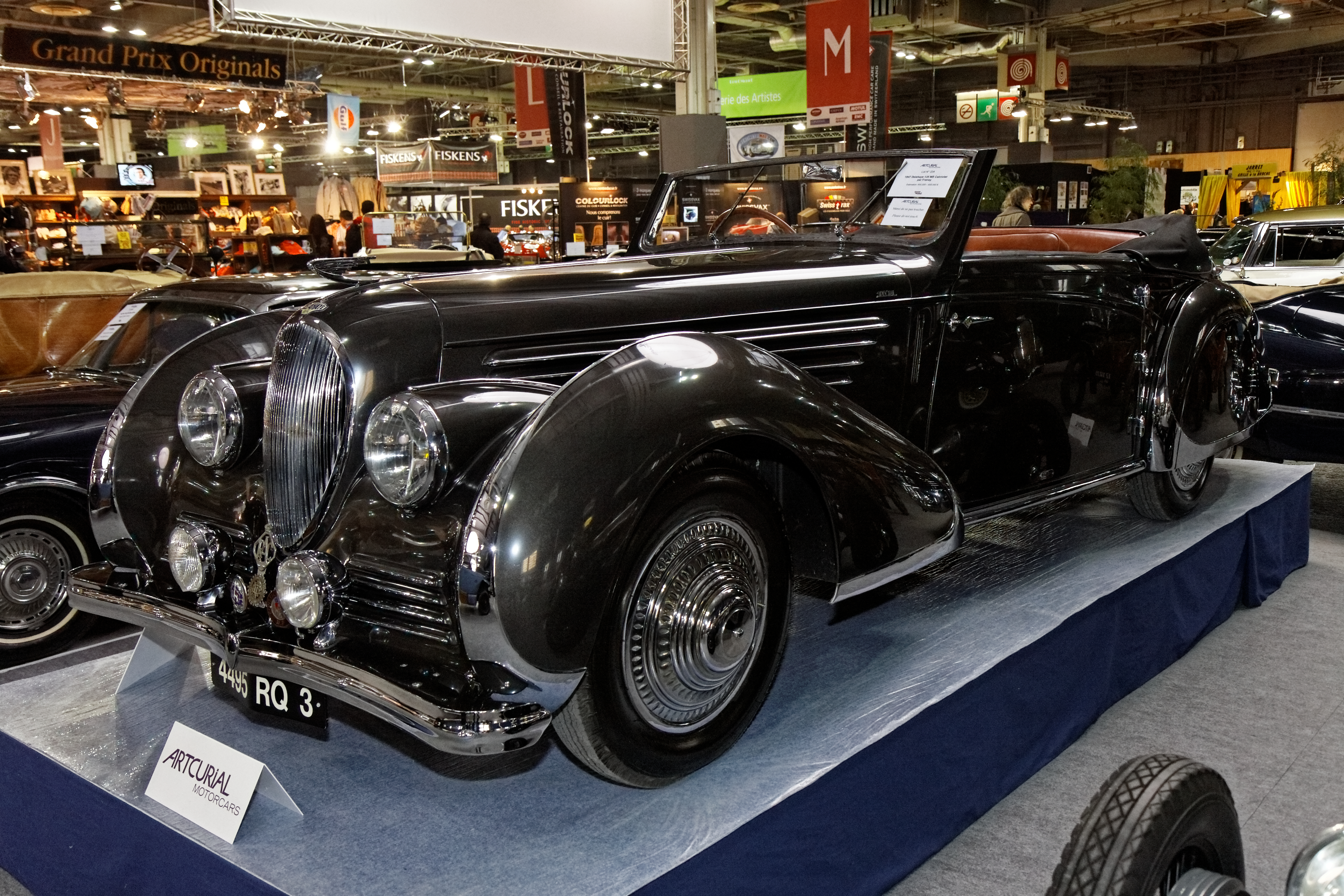
1947 Delahaye 135-MS Cabriolet Franay

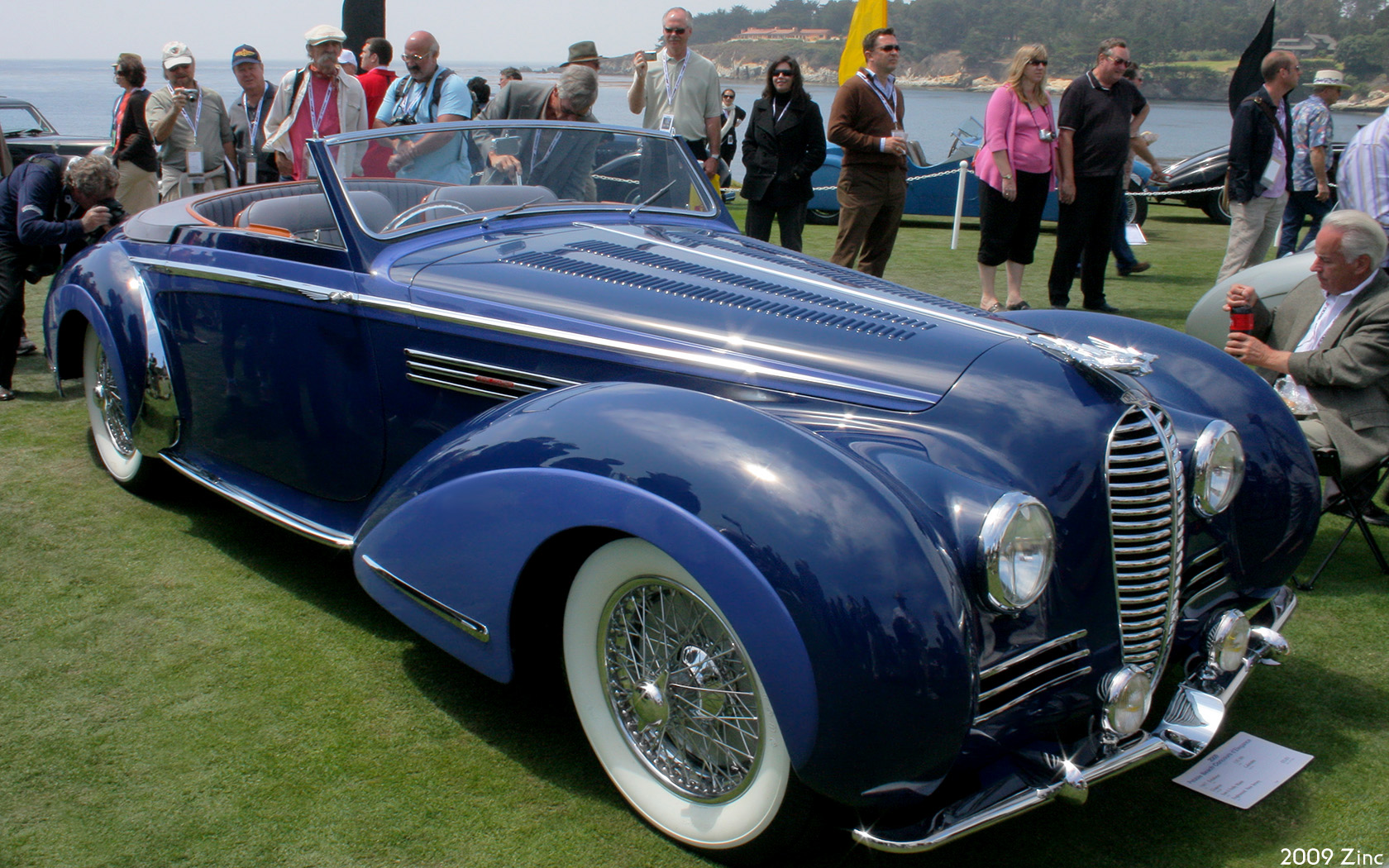
1947 Delahaye Type 135-MS Chapron cabriolet

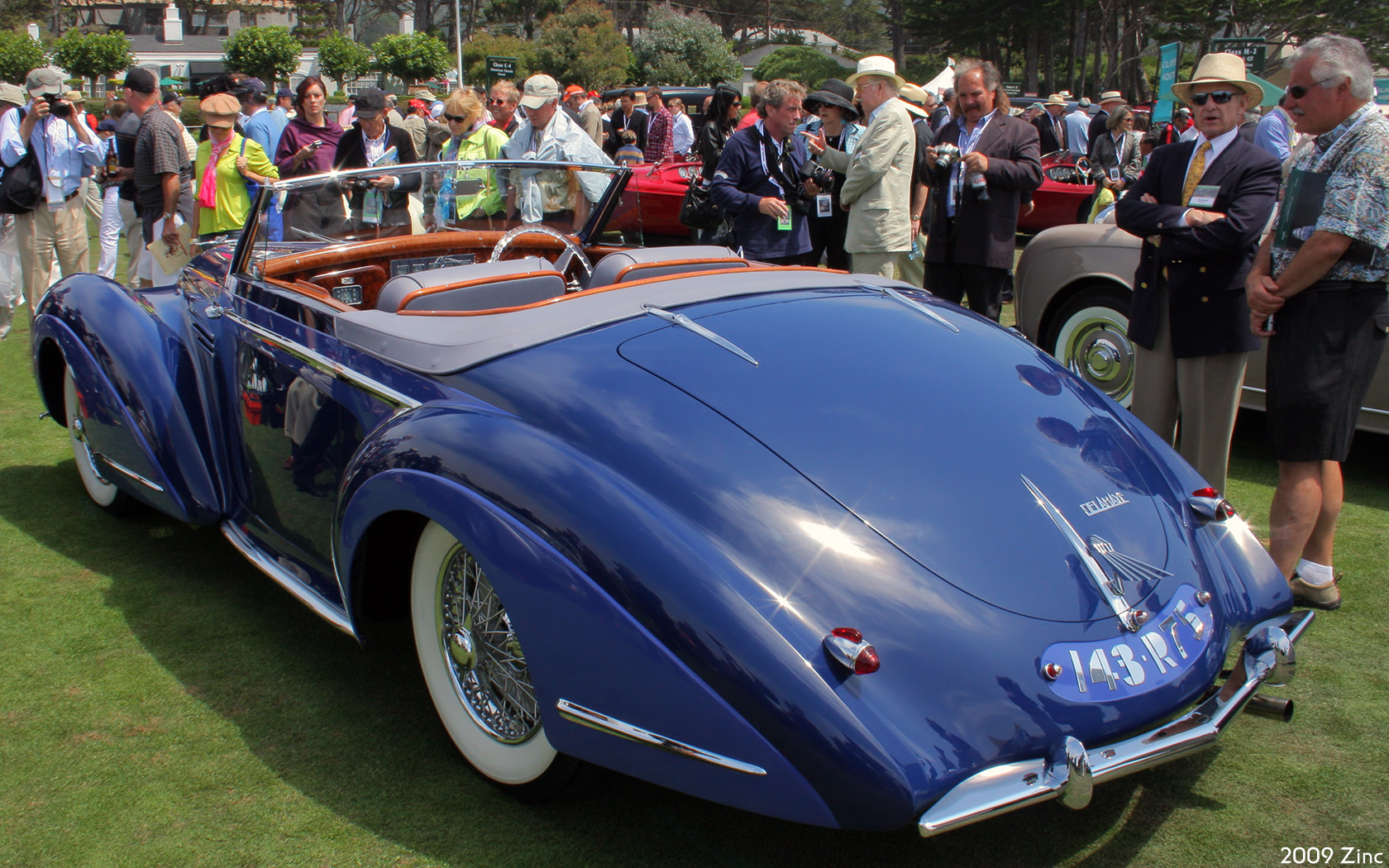
1947 Delahaye Type 135-MS Chapron cabriolet

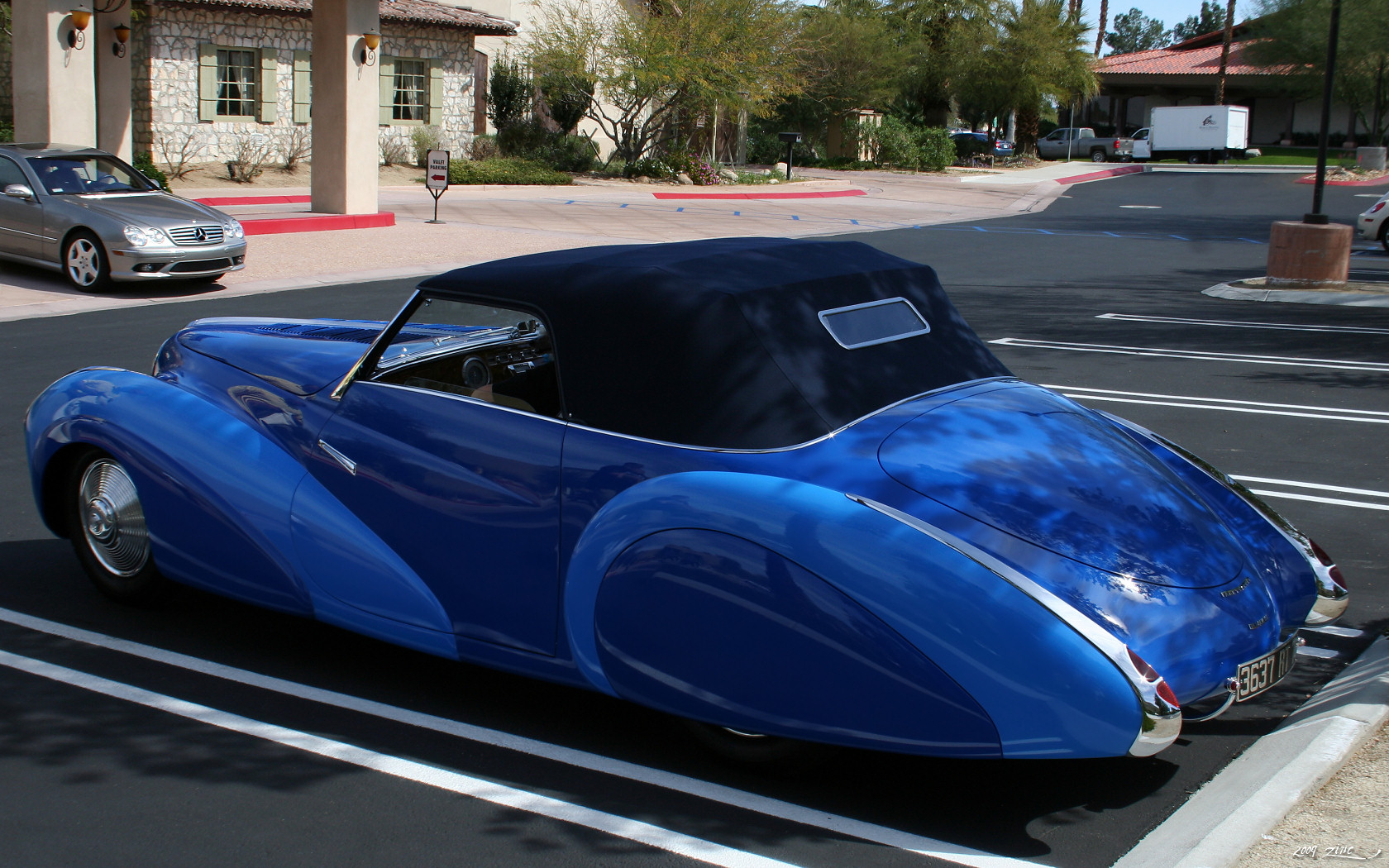
1948 Delahaye 135-MS Faget & Varnet cabriolet (chassis 801 077)

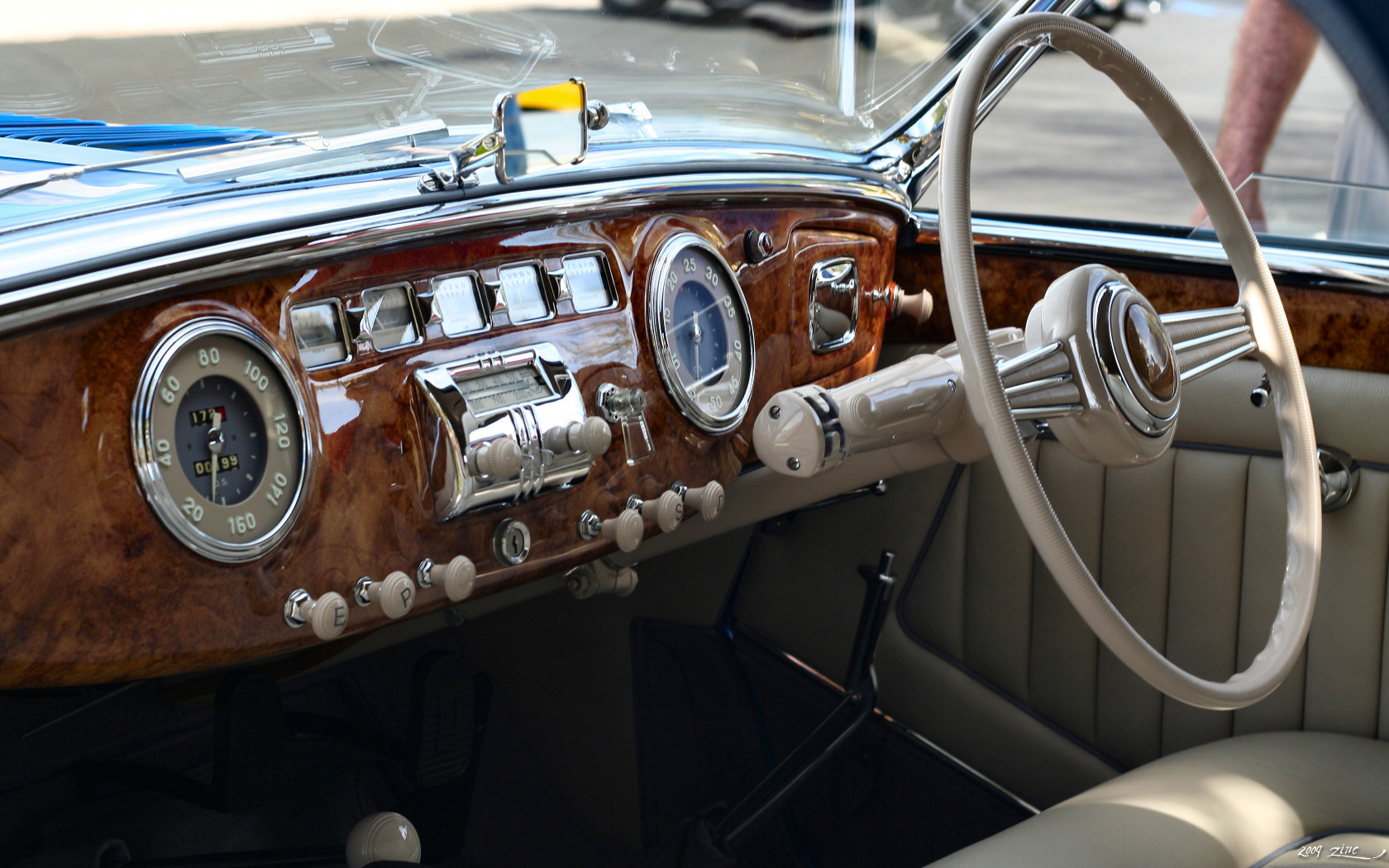
1948 Delahaye 135-MS Faget & Varnet cabriolet interior

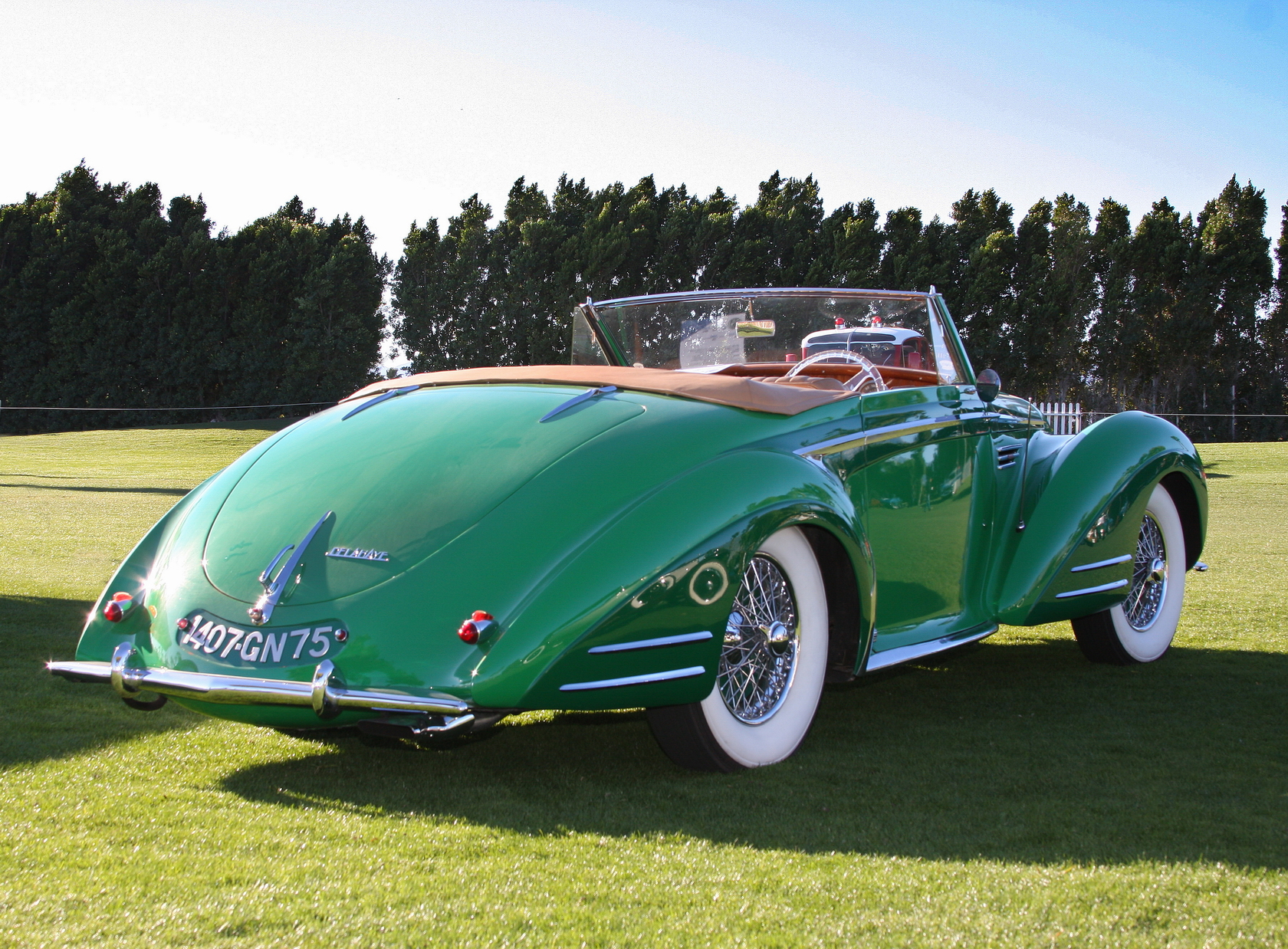
1948 Delahaye Type 135-MS Chapron cabriolet "Vedette" 1948 (chassis 800 384)

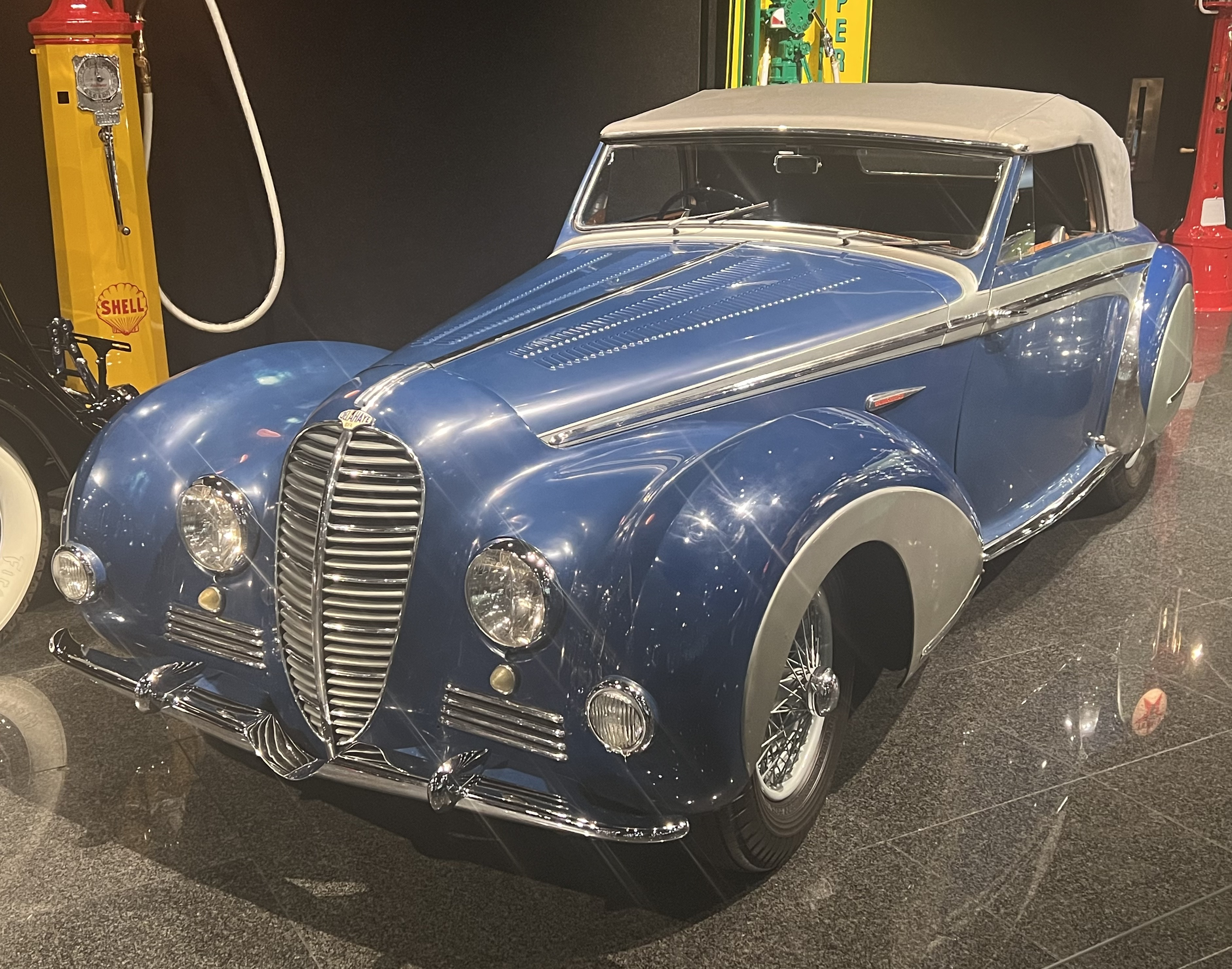
1949 Delahaye Type 135-MS Chapron "Vedette" cabriolet (chassis 800 727)

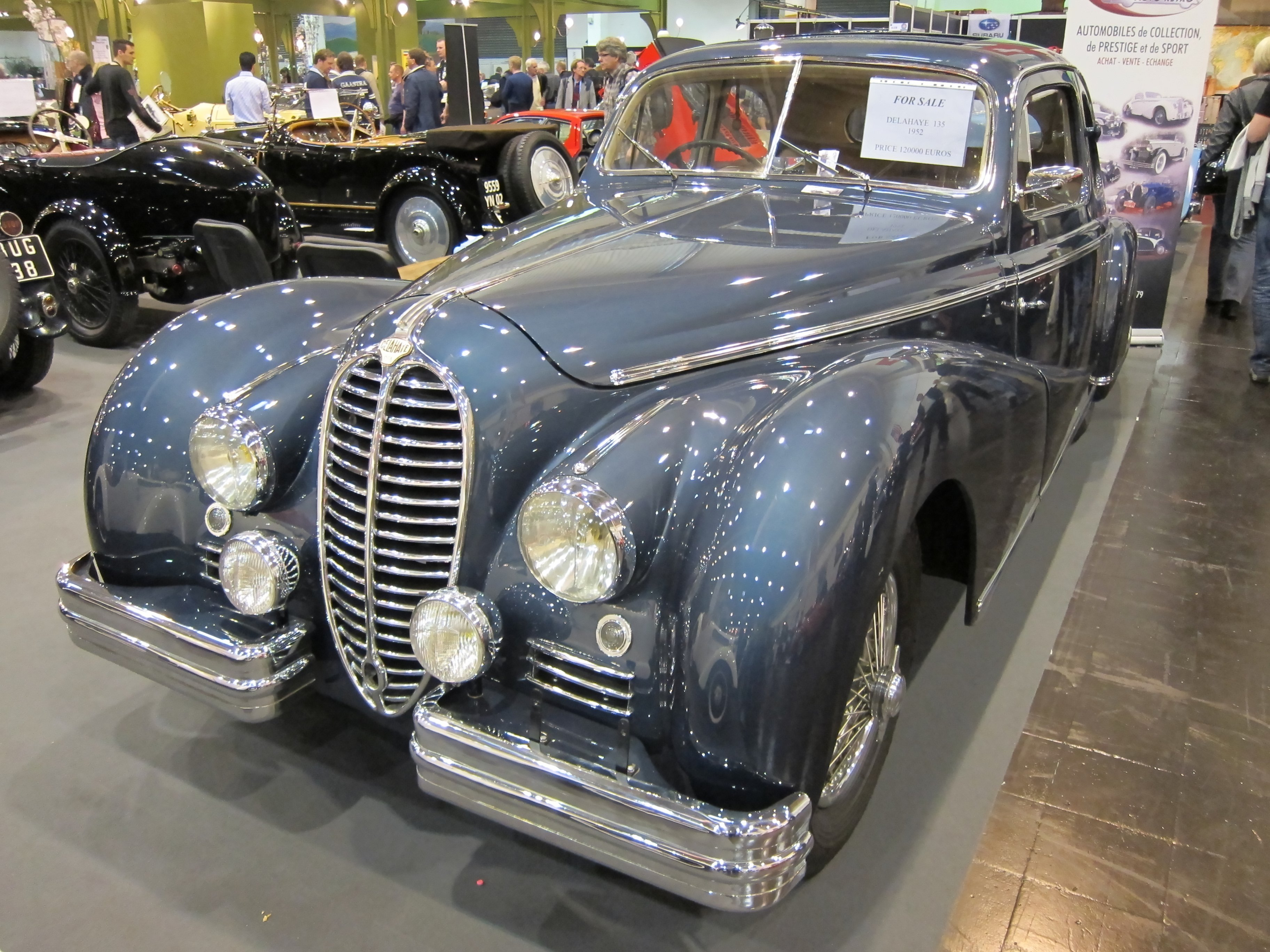
1949 Delahaye 135-MS Guilloré coach "Alpin" (chassis 801 186)

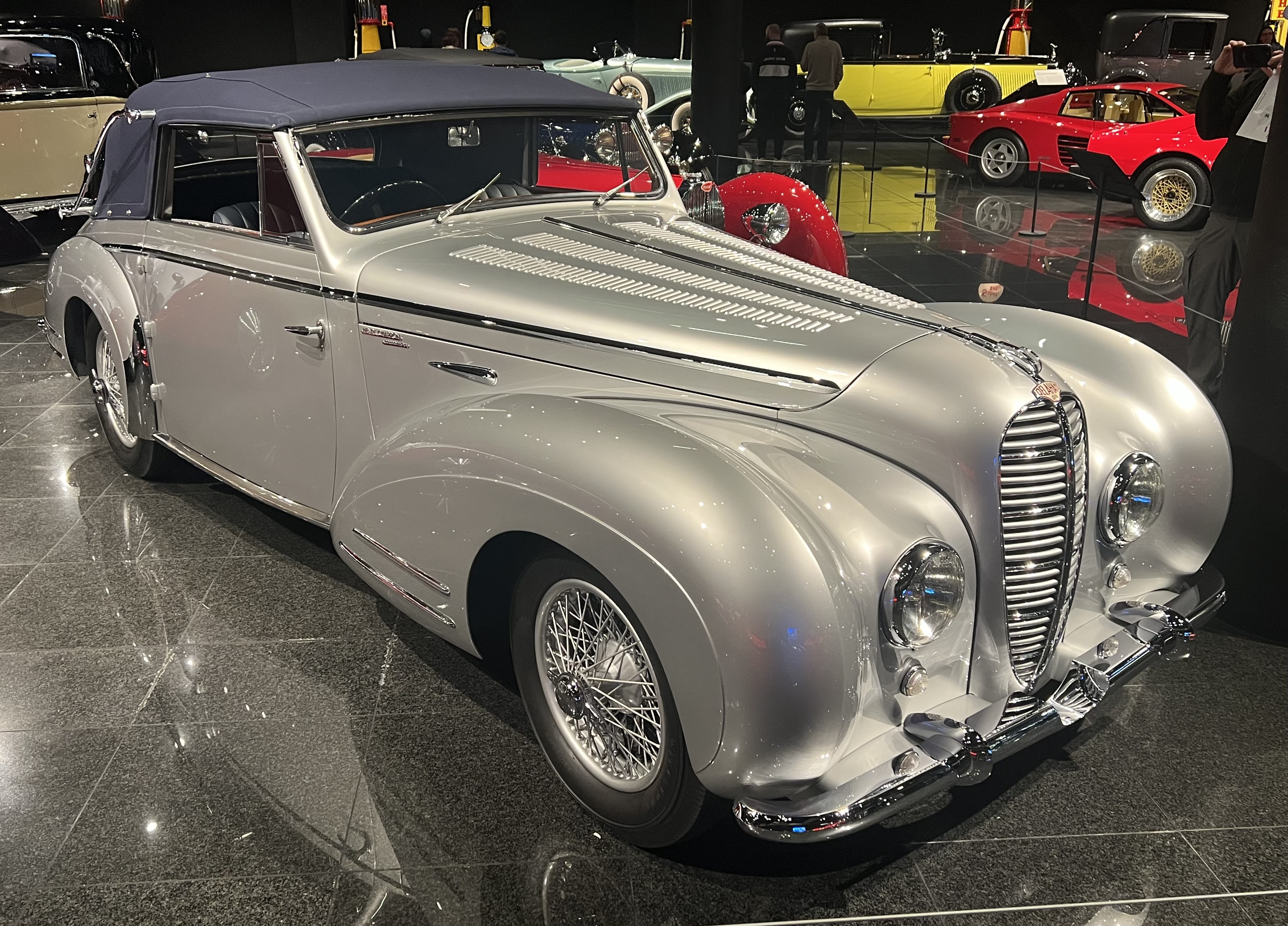
1950 Delahaye 135-MS Chapron cabriolet "Dandy" (chassis 801 011)

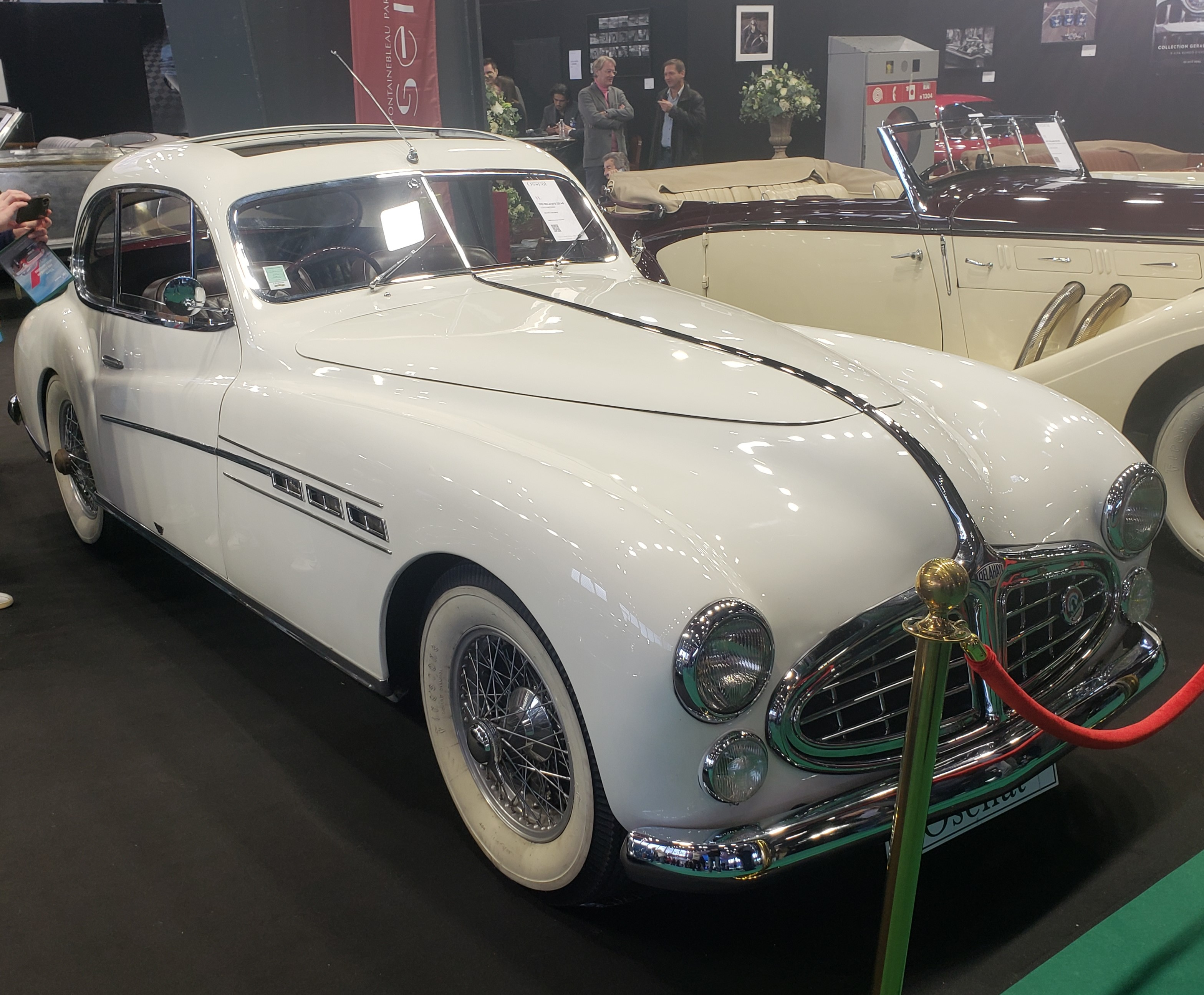
1951 Delahaye Type 135-MS Figoni & Falaschi coach (chassis 801 736)

== Competition ==
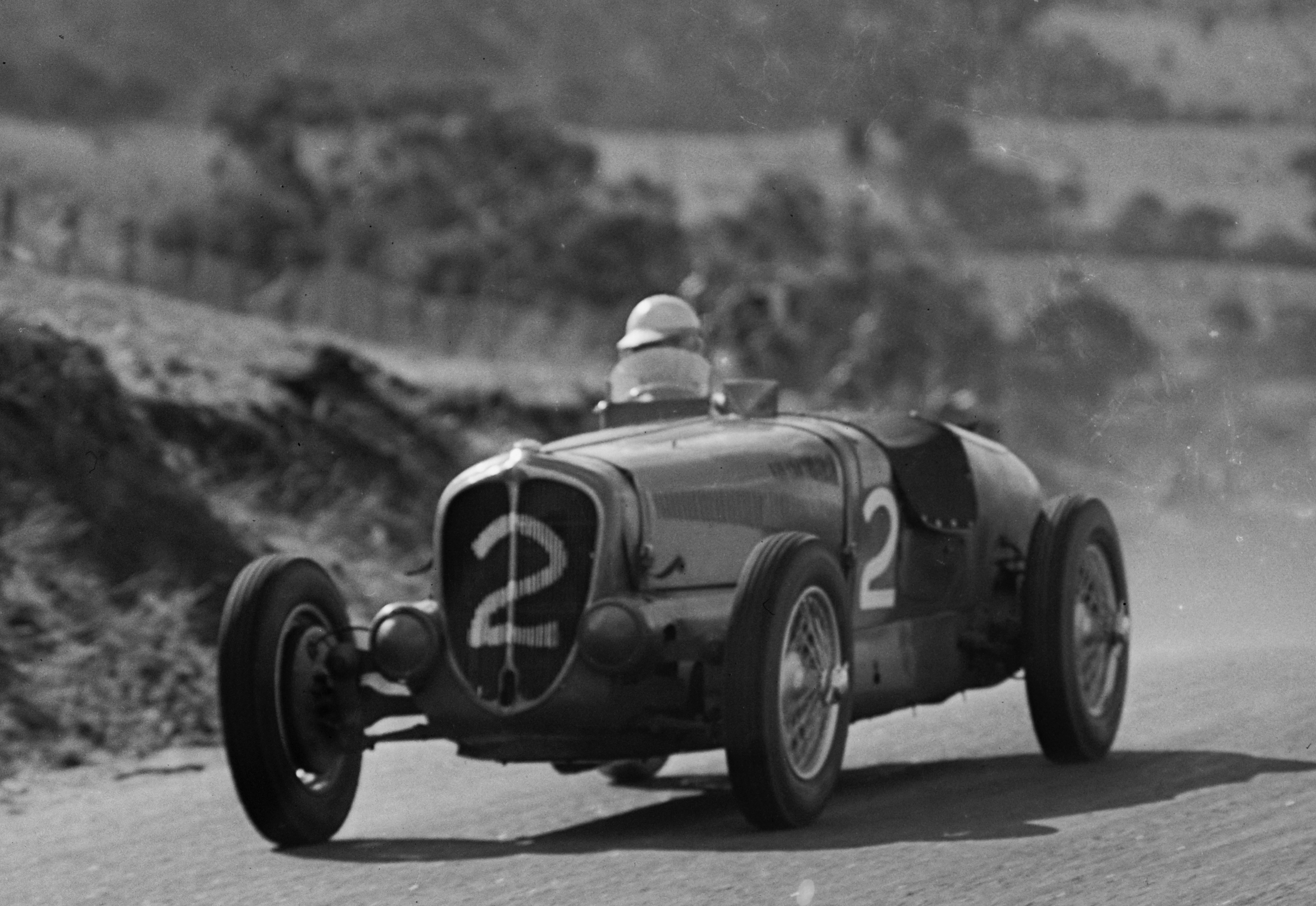
Delahaye 135 racing car driven by John Crouch, Grand Prix, Bathurst, October 1946

The 135 was successful as a racing car during the late 1930s, winning the Monte Carlo Rally in 1937 and 24 Hours of Le Mans in 1938. The Le Mans victory, with Chaboud and Trémoulet at the wheel, was decisive, with two more Delahayes coming in second and fourth. A regular 135 came seventh at the 1935 Le Mans, and in 1937 135MS came in second and third. Appearing again in 1939, two 135MS made it to sixth and eighth place, and again after the war the now venerable 135MS finished in 5th, 9th, and 10th. 135s finished 2nd, 3rd, 4th, 5th, 7th, 11th and 12th in the 1936 French Sports Car Grand Prix at Montlhéry.

John Crouch won the 1949 Australian Grand Prix driving a 135MS.
