= Tracta =

French automobile manufacturer

SA des Automobiles Tracta (Tracta)
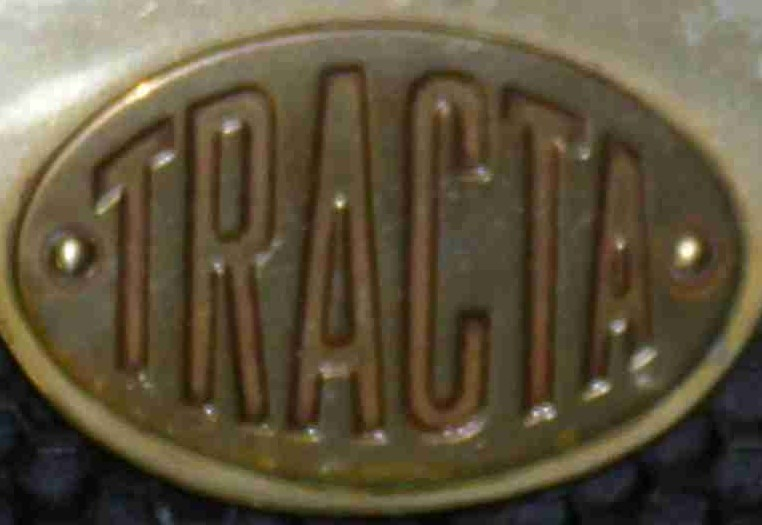

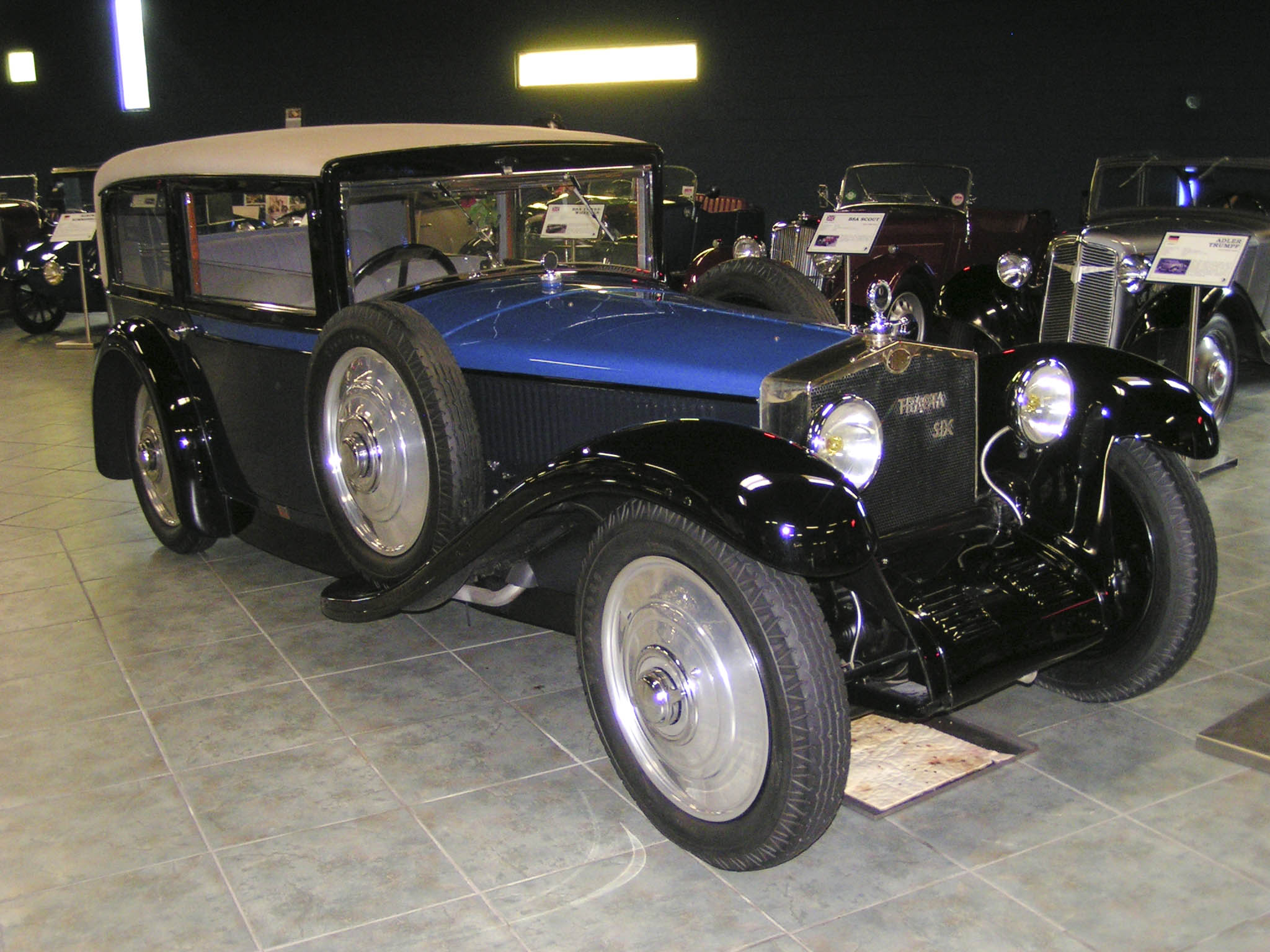
- Tracta Type E
- Founded: 1926
- Defunct: 1934
- Headquarters: Versailles initially Asnières subsequently, France
- Key people: Jean-Albert Grégoire; Pierre Fenaille
- Products: Automobiles

Tracta was a French car maker based in Asnières, Seine, that was active between 1926 and 1934. They were pioneers of front-wheel-drive vehicles.

== The business ==
The business was directed and cars were designed by the engineer Jean-Albert Grégoire, who controlled the business, with financial support from his friend Pierre Fenaille.

== The cars ==
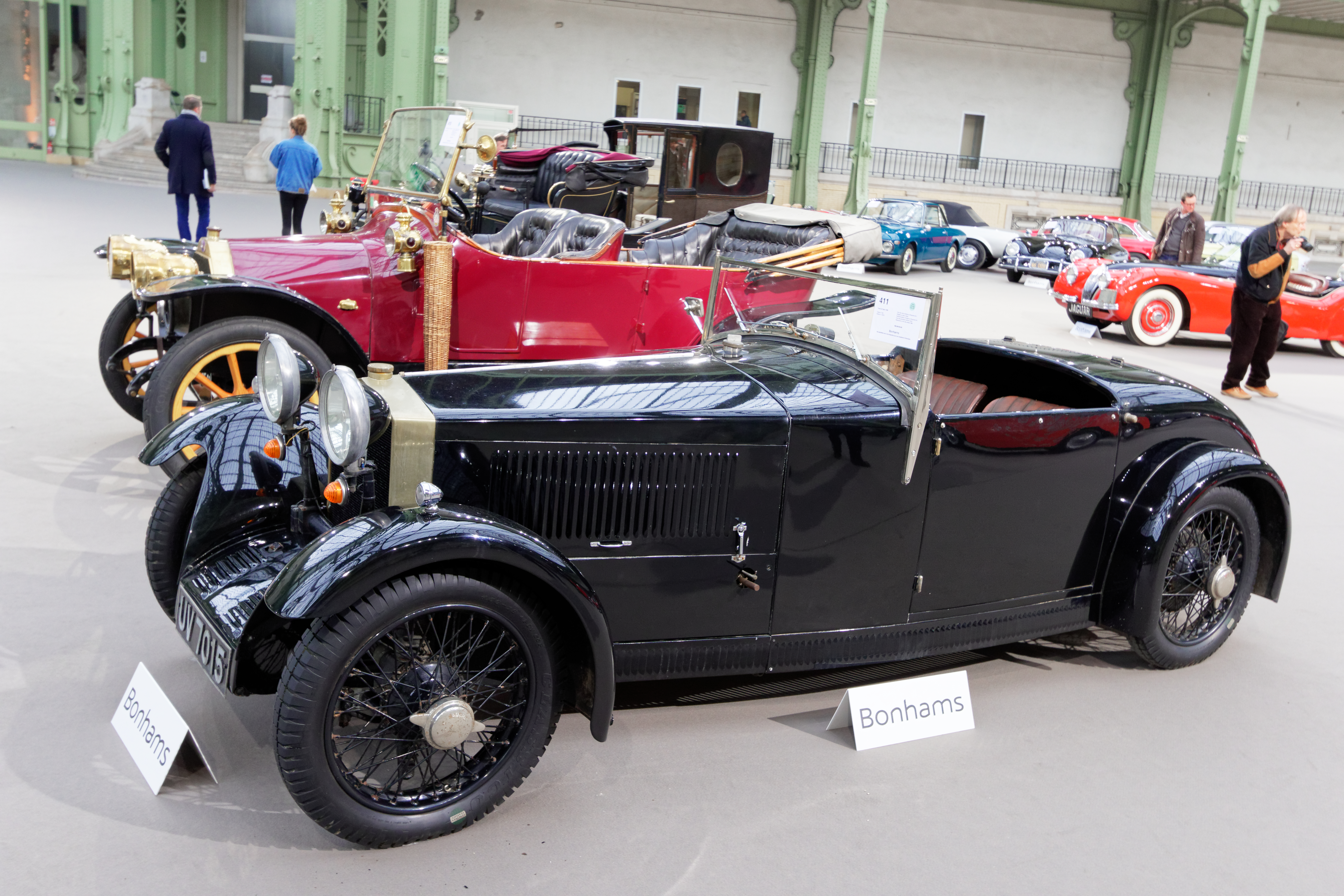
1928 Type D2 Sport

The cars were initially built in small numbers for competition use, but they were exhibited and offered for road use at the 1927 Paris Motor Show. They used a front-wheel-drive system featuring Grégoire's patented Tracta constant-velocity joint and sliding pillar independent front suspension and a live axle with quarter-elliptic leaf springs at the rear. 1100, 1200, 1500 and 1600 cc engines made by S.C.A.P. were available with optional Cozette supercharger. The 1500 cc car was claimed to reach 80 mph.

The first cars were made in a workshop in Versailles but Grégoire soon moved to a small factory in Asnières. After about 140 cars were made there came a change of engines with larger six-cylinder 2.7-litre units from Continental and 3- and 3.3-litre ones from Hotchkiss fitted in coupé and saloon-bodied road cars.

Notable models had the following names:

- Tracta Type A
- Tracta Type A Gephi
- Tracta Type E
- Tracta Type D2 Sport
- Tracta Spéciale

== Competition ==
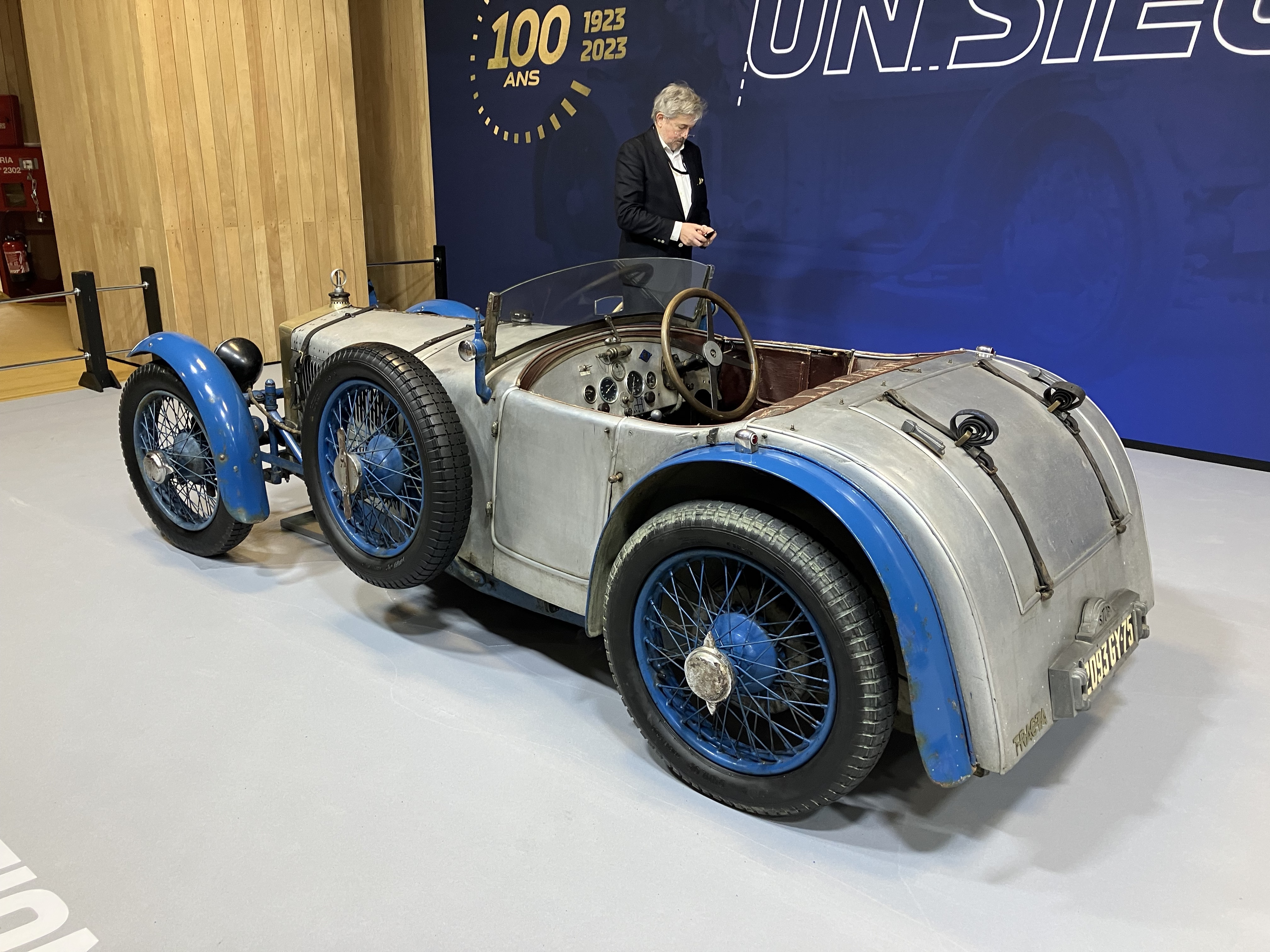
1927 Type A Gephi

=== 24 Hours of Le Mans ===
==== 1927 ====
Tracta appeared at 24 Hours of Le Mans for the first time in 1927. It brought two Type A Gephi. Car number 19 did not start due to an accident on the way to the circuit and number 20 finished 7th.

==== 1928 ====
Three cars competed in the 1928 Le Mans 24 Hour race, two Type As, including one driven by Grégoire (in partnership with) himself, and one Type A Gephi. All three finished, albeit well down the field.

==== 1929 ====
Tracta returned to Le Mans in 1929, now with four cars, three Type As using supercharged 4-cylinder four-stroke engines and a fourth one, a Spéciale, with experimental two-stroke engine designed by the engineer Cozette (who at the time was better known as a designer of superchargers). Only two of the Tractas competing in 1929 completed the race, the two-stroke experimental car retiring after 43 laps.

==== 1930 ====
By 1930 only two Type As appeared a Le Mans, with an overall 8th and 9th finishing position.

== The end ==
The company failed to make money from car manufacture and production stopped in 1934. Grégoire kept the factory at Asnières and used it for his own design and engineering work. He would use it for the chassis and engine of his "Sports Cabriolet" in the mid 1950s, following his acrimonious break with Hotchkiss over the technically adventurous but commercially disastrous Hotchkiss Grégoire.

== Afterlife ==
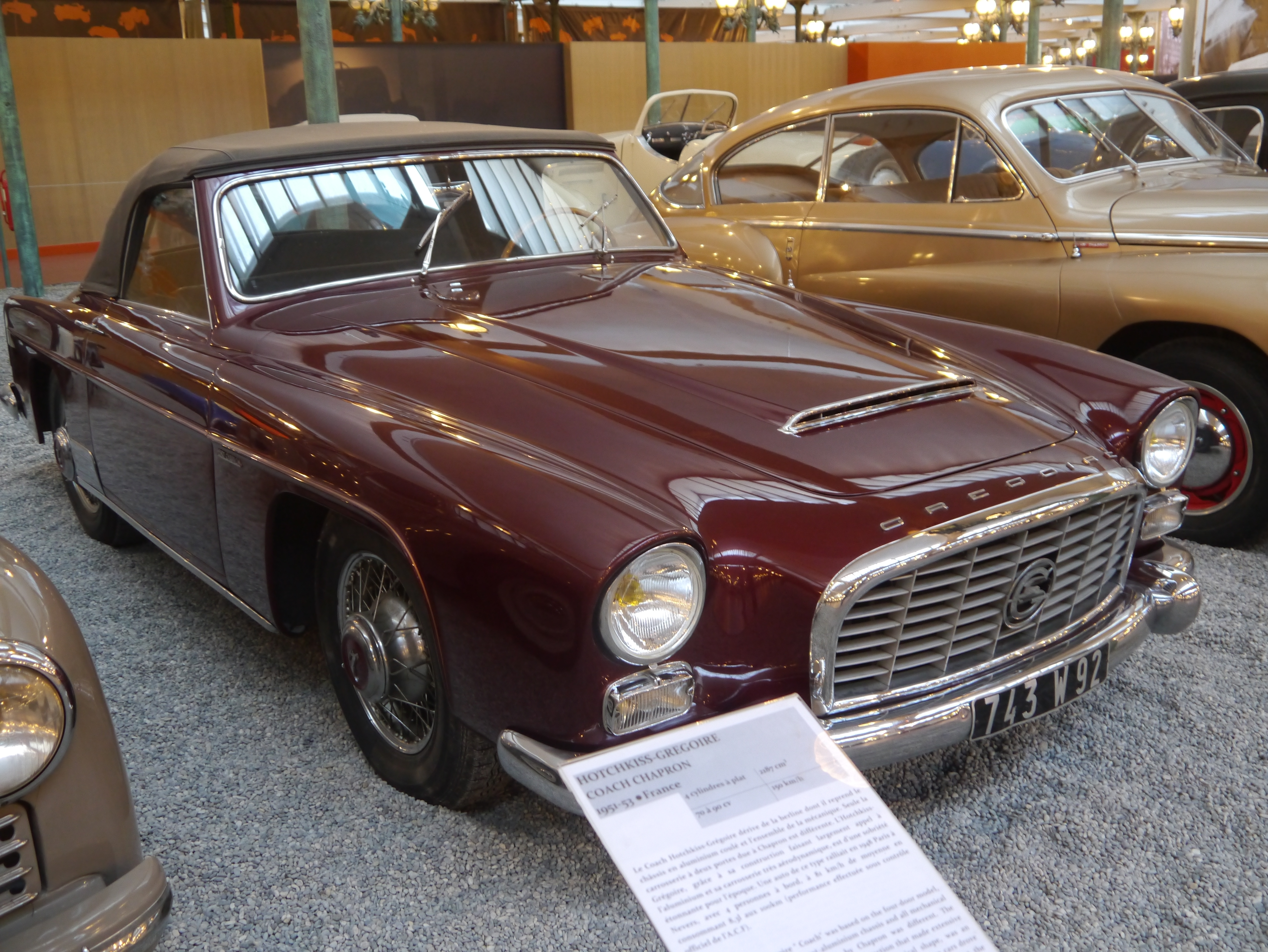
Hotchkiss-Grégoire Sport Cabriolet with Chapron body

In 1955 Grégoire introduced an intriguing Sports Cabriolet prototype, with body by Chapron, front-drive and a 2188 cc supercharged ohv boxer engine ahead of the front wheels. Only four cars were built. In mechanical terms the car was closely based on the car Grégoire had developed for Hotchkiss in the late 1940s, but it featured a stylish new two-door body, constructed by Chapron.

It is not clear how seriously Grégoire contemplated selling the Sports Cabriolets exhibited in the 1950s, but they provided an impressive showcase for his engineering philosophy and talent. The car is generally described as the Grégoire Sports Cabriolet. Nevertheless, Grégoire had retained rights to the Tracta name. Two of the Sports Cabriolets produced turned up in October 1956 at the 43rd Paris Motor Show: one was exhibited on the Henri Chapron stand and the other on a small stand against the wall, positioned next to that of the British AC company, and the identified by the name "Grégoire (Tracta)". The car was listed by the manufacturer in 1956 at 3,500,000 francs, significantly more than the 2,869,000 francs quoted at the time for the much larger and more powerful Facel Vega FV.

== Gallery ==
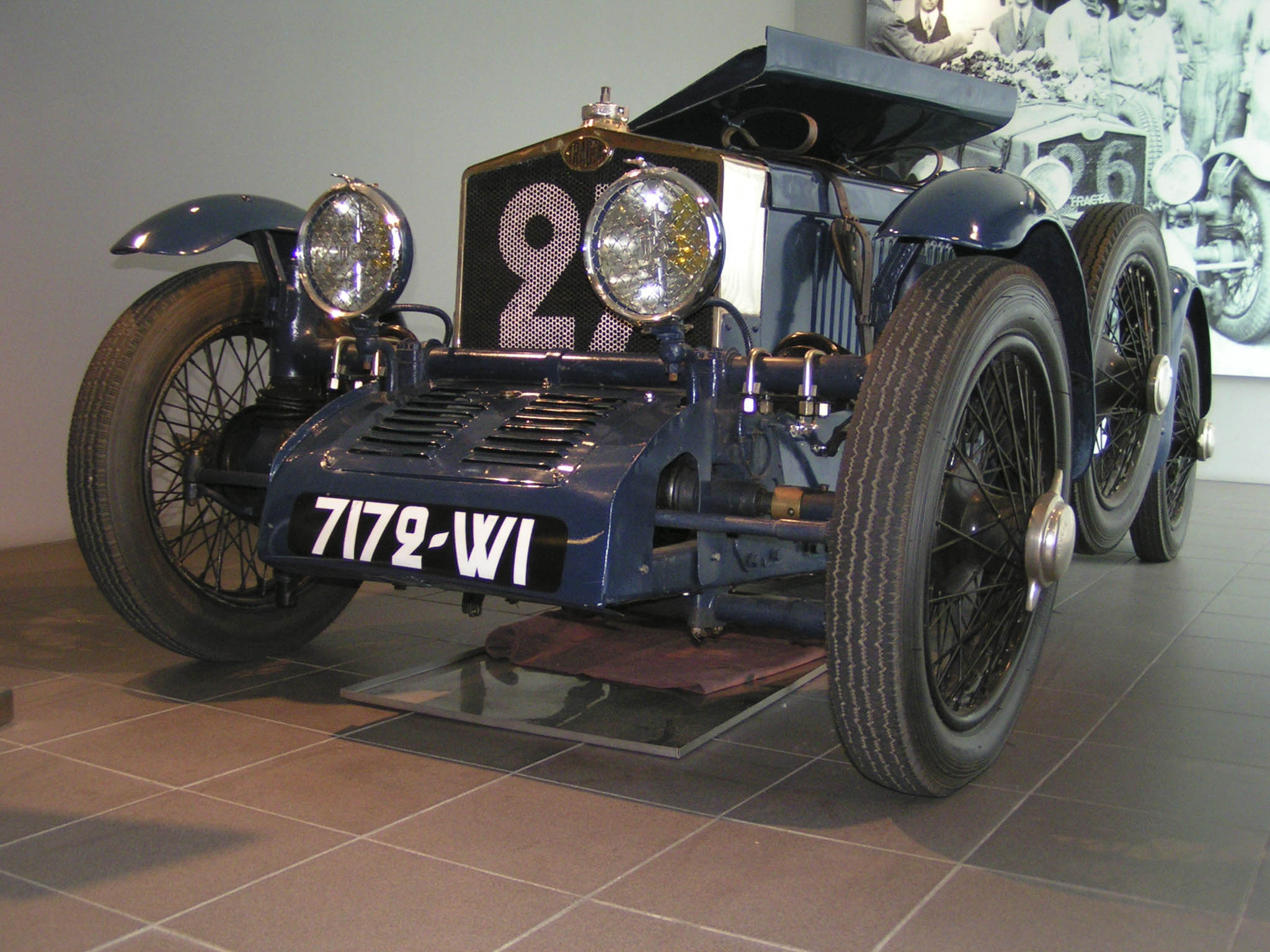
1929 Tracta A, class winner and 7th total at the 24 hour race at Le Mans, 1929

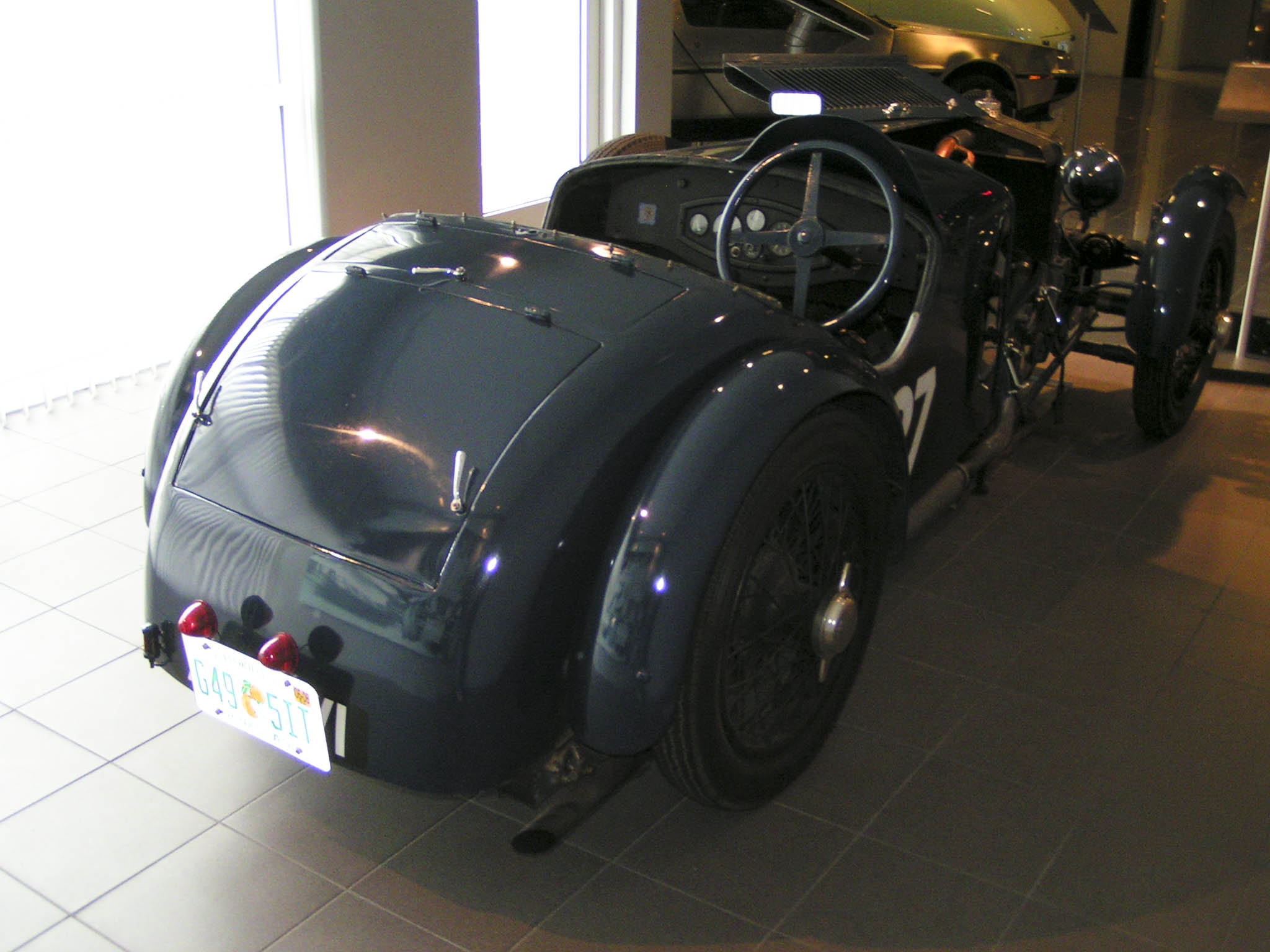
1929 Tracta A Le Mans (rear)

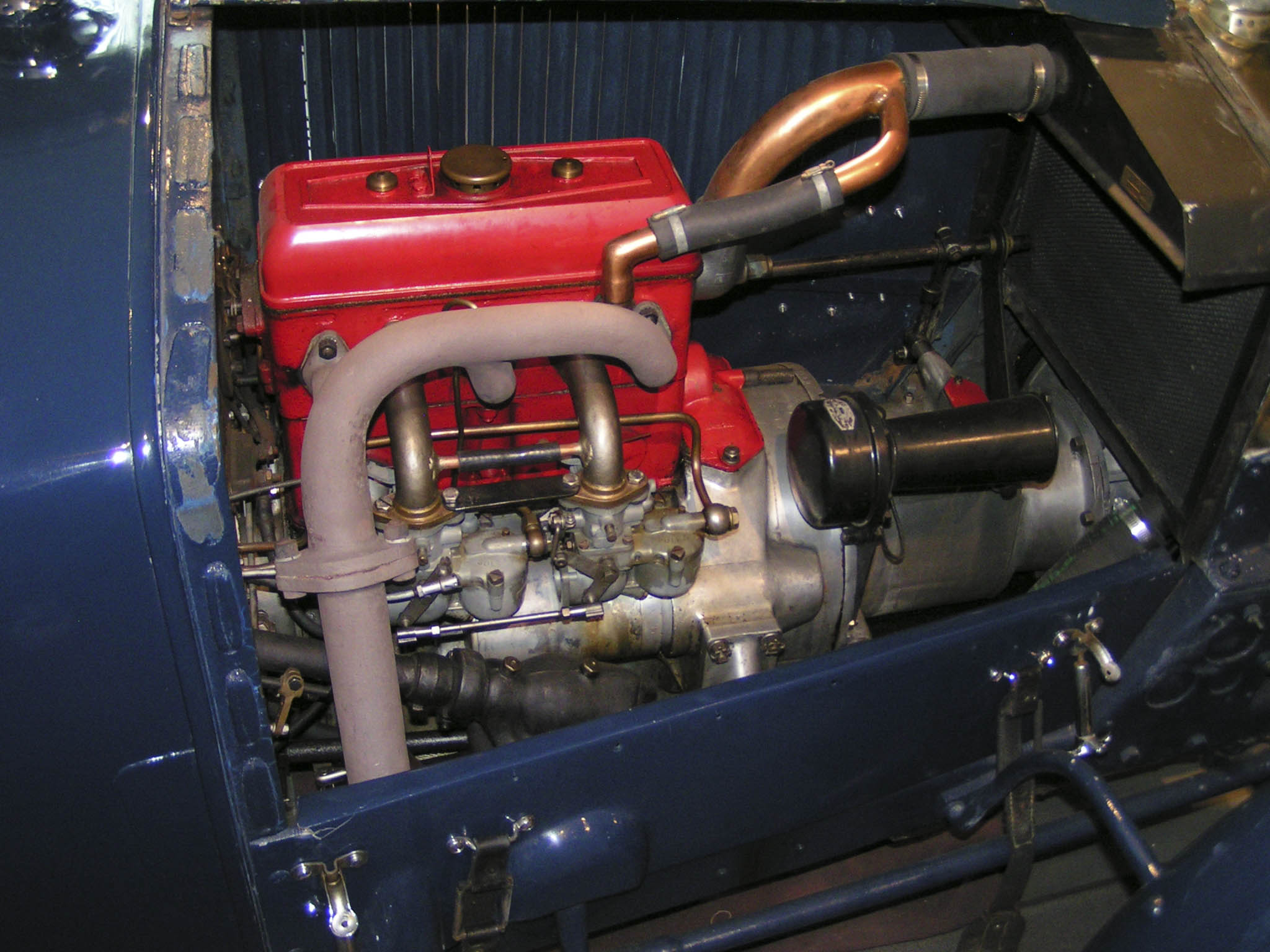
1929 Tracta A Le Mans: S.C.A.P. 4-cylinder engine, 995 cc, 45 hp

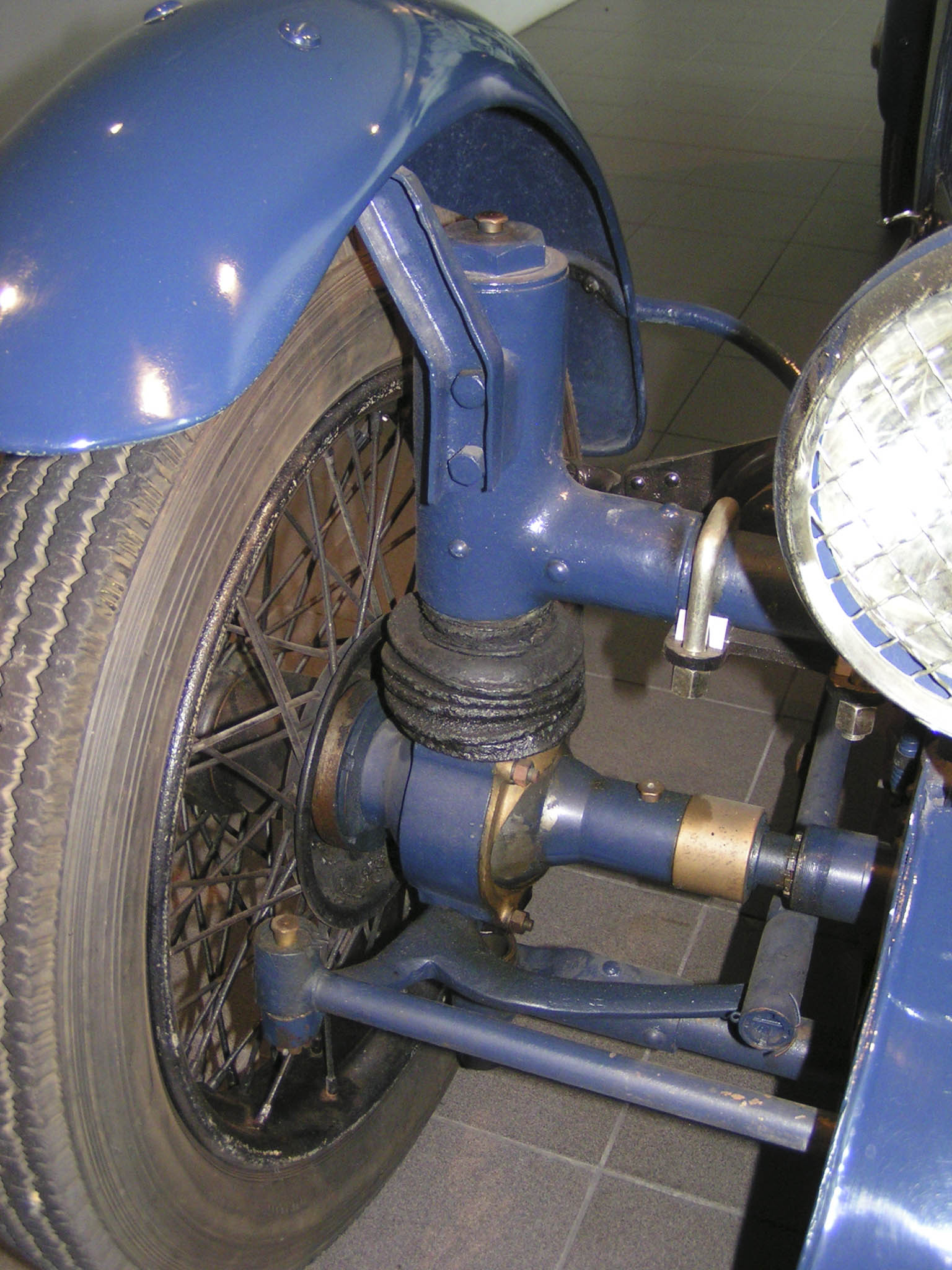
1929 Tracta A Le Mans: Grégoire patented front axle with front-wheel drive
