= 1896 in motorsport =

The following is an overview of the events of 1896 in motorsport, including the major racing events, racing festivals, circuits that were opened and closed during a year, championships and non-championship events that were established and disestablished in a year, and births and deaths of racing drivers and other motorsport people.

== Events ==
It was the first year with motorsport competition with 1896 Paris–Marseille–Paris as the first race.

== Births ==
Date	Month	Name	Nationality	Occupation	Note	Ref
26	July	Tim Birkin	British	Racing driver	24 Hours of Le Mans winner (1929, 1931).	
6	December	Bernard Rubin	Australian	Racing driver	24 Hours of Le Mans winner (1928).	
28	December	Philippe Étancelin	French	Racing driver	24 Hours of Le Mans winner (1934).	
