= 1928 24 Hours of Le Mans =

6th 24 Hours of Le Mans endurance race

Previous: 1927	Next: 1929
Index: Races | Winners

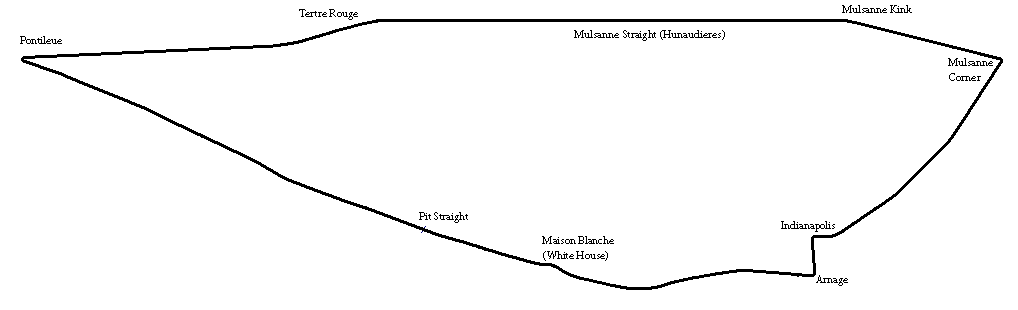
the Le Mans track in 1928

The 1928 24 Hours of Le Mans was the 6th Grand Prix of Endurance that took place at the Circuit de la Sarthe on 16 and 17 June 1928.

Bentley director Woolf Barnato and Australian-born Bernard Rubin in a Bentley 4½ Litre gave the company back-to-back victories after a race-long duel with the Stutz of Édouard Brisson and Robert Bloch. In the process they won the inaugural prize for overall distance.

The big publicity from the previous year's race and the White House crash raised manufacturer interest and several British and American companies brought teams to the race. In fact foreign cars outnumbered French ones for the first time. The race started at a record pace, but after two of the Bentleys and the Ariès retired early, it became a one-on-one duel between the Bentley and the Stutz. They traded positions through the night and into the next morning. Going into the final hours the British car was suffering from water leaks and overheating, while the American car was losing its gears. Both teams drove as hard as they dared, and in the end the distance between the two was barely a lap, and both cars exceeded the previous record overall distance.

Salmson achieved consecutive victories in the Biennial Cup, while the new car from Bollack Netter and Co won the Index of Performance.

== Regulations ==
The CSI (Commission Sportive Internationale - the AIACR’s regulatory body) had issued new racing regulations. The Appendix C linked minimum dry-weights (i.e. without liquids, tyres and tools) to engine capacity. These included the following ranges:

Engine size	Minimum weight
Over 8000cc	1800kg
5001-8000cc	1680kg
3001-5000cc	1200kg
2001-3000cc	860kg
1501-2000cc	780kg
1101-1500cc	660kg
751-1100cc	420kg
501-750cc	330kg

In lieu of getting the entrants to drain their cars at scrutineering, the Automobile Club de l'Ouest (ACO) decreed that 15kg would cover the weight of fluids on cars over 3-litres and 10kg for those under. The required ‘passenger-ballast’ rule of 60kg per extra seat, after the driver's, was maintained and additional to those minimum weights.

But the main innovation from the ACO this year was the introduction of the Coupe à la Distance for the car that travelled the furthest over the twenty-four hours. Supercharged engines were now allowed (but not into the final round of the 1927-28 Biennial Cup), with their effective capacity regarded as 1.3 times their swept volume. The driving hood test, when cars had to run the first twenty laps with their hoods up, was discarded. However, all convertibles were still required to have a hood fitted, though stowed.

Once again, the ACO adjusted the Index target distances; although only by small margin. Example targets included the following:

Engine size	1927 Minimum laps	1928 Minimum laps	Required Average speed
3000cc	129	129	92.8 km/h (57.7 mph)
2000cc	118	122	87.7 km/h (54.5 mph)
1500cc	107	111	79.8 km/h (49.6 mph)
1100cc	94	94	71.2 km/h (44.2 mph)

The Hors Course rule was relaxed considerably this year – with cars now only disqualified for completing insufficient distance at the 12-hour mark and not every six hours as before. That distance now only had to be 80% of the target distance and not the previous 85%.

The track re-surfacing was completed along its whole length and reflectors were put on the corners for better awareness at night. Roadside picket fencing was put up at all the spectator access areas and the public address system now also covered all those areas.

== Entries ==
After the previous year's short entry list, the ACO was gratified to have a far healthier entry list this year. No doubt motivated by the excitement of 1927, and a prize for an overall winner, there were more cars in the large-engine classes, although Ariès was still the only French manufacturer in that category. Indeed, foreign cars outnumbered French cars for the first time, including new entries from Lagonda, Alvis and Aston Martin from Great Britain, Alfa Romeo and Itala from Italy and Stutz from the USA. After the tough race the previous year, there were only six entries eligible for the 1927-28 Biennial Cup, with Salmson taking only one of its two available spots.

Category	Entries	Classes
Large-sized engines	11 / 9	over 2-litre
Medium-sized engines	18 / 15	1.1 to 2-litre
Small-sized engines	13 / 9	up to 1.1-litre
Total entrants	42 / 33	

- Note: The first number is the number of entries, the second the number who started.

Defending distance winners Bentley arrived with a four-car entry (one kept back for spare parts) and were strong favourites to win the inaugural distance prize. The cars were all 4½-litre tourers, two of them with racing chassis designed by Vanden Plas. The engine put out 130 bhp making them capable of a top speed of 165 kp/h (105 mph). Company director, and chief shareholder, Woolf Barnato drove with his wealthy Australian-born Grosvenor Square neighbour Bernard Rubin. They had the original 4½-litre (nicknamed “Old Mother Gun”) that had been mangled in the White House crash the previous year. The 1927 winner, Dudley Benjafield, was this time paired with 1924-winner Frank Clement. The third car was driven by another of the “Bentley Boys” debutantes, Sir Henry “Tim” Birkin, who was accompanied by the experienced Jean Chassagne, who had chased the team so hard in his Ariès the previous year.

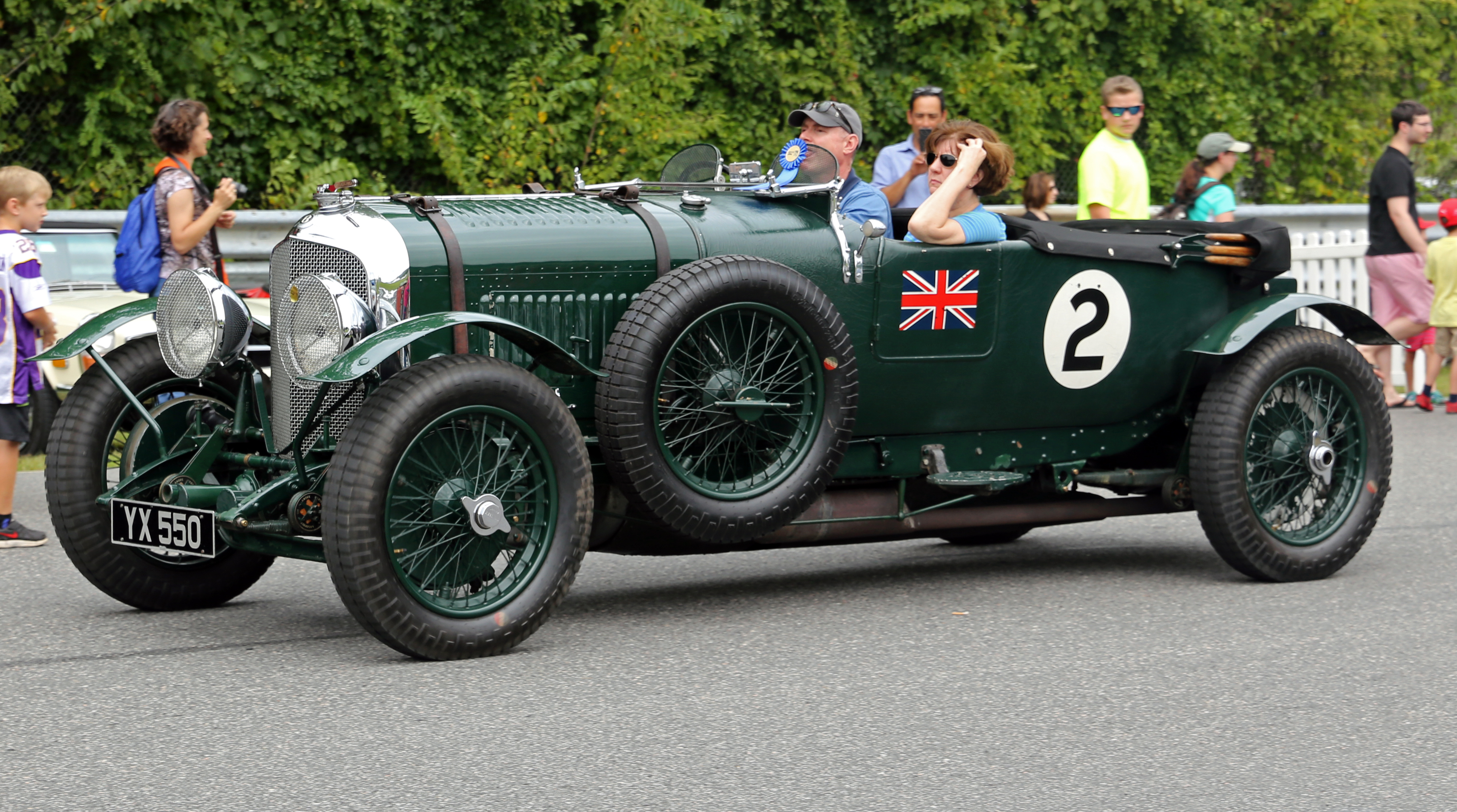
Bentley 4½-litre

Automobiles Ariès again returned with its streamlined 3-litre GP2 surbaissée “tank”. Although showing its age, the 3-litre engine had been tuned to now put out 96 bhp. It was driven by works drivers Robert Laly and Louis Rigal. As before the team also entered a pair of smaller 1.1-litre CC4 cars.

The biggest car in the field, by engine volume and stature was a Stutz BB Blackhawk. Its 5-litre engine produced 125 bhp and the car had been winning many races in the American AAA racing series. It was entered by Charles Terres Weymann, the Paris-based American car-distributor and aviator and driven by Le Mans veterans Édouard Brisson and Robert Bloch formerly of Lorraine-Dietrich.

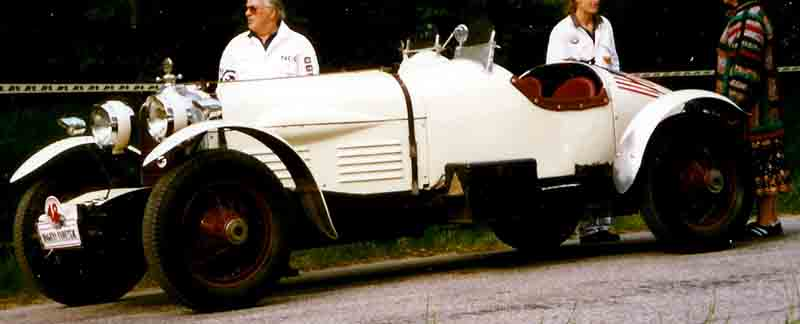
Stutz Model BB Blackhawk

After a promising debut in the 1925 race, Chrysler returned with a big four-car team, once again entered by its French distributor, the Grand Garage St Didier Paris. The “72” was the latest version of the same Chrysler Six but had a bigger 4.1-litre sidevalve engine that developed 85 bhp. The team hired a squad of grand-prix drivers: Henri Stoffel (1925 Chrysler driver) was with dual race-winner André Rossignol, up-and-coming race-winner Louis Chiron ran with Cyril de Vere, Conte “Freddie” Zehender was paired with Jacques Ledure while the Cantacuzino brothers (Parisian-resident Romanian aristocrats) had the fourth car.

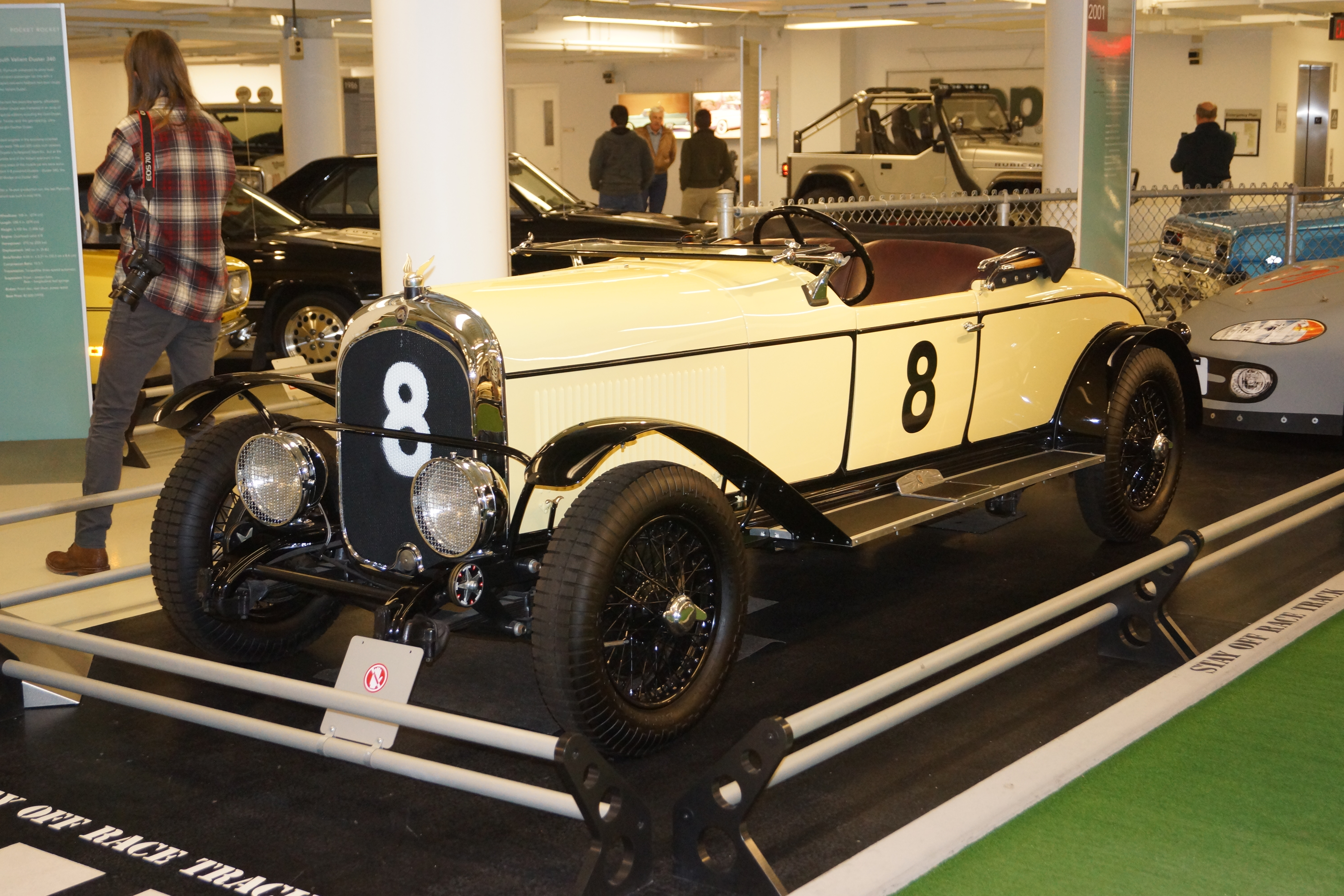
Chrysler Six 72

Alfa Romeo had been vying with Bugatti for top Grand Prix honours in the mid-1920s. In sports-car racing they were also proving to be the team to beat with the new design from Vittorio Jano. The 6C-1500 Super Sport dominated Italian races, including winning the new Mille Miglia event. The supercharged 1.5-litre version only put out 75 bhp but gave a top speed of 140 kp/h (85 mph). The Russian émigrée Count Boris Ivanowski entered one for the race. However, the ACO scrutineers rejected it, saying it was “too racy” with too many standard components of a touring car removed to be eligible.

Itala’s best racing days were pre-war, but two cars came to Le Mans for the manufacturer’s only appearance. The Tipo 65 had a twin-cam 2-litre engine producing 70 bhp and capable of 130 kp/h (80 mph). Guy Benoist, winner of four Grand Prix in 1927 was partnered with former Chenard-Walcker driver Christian Dauvergne, while the two French nom-de-plumes “Sabipa” and “Christian” drove the other car.

Like Itala, the British Lagonda company had been racing since before the war. The new 2-litre Speed Model had been very successful in 1927. It had a top speed of almost 150 kp/h (95 mph) and three were entered. Managed by former Bentley driver Bertie Kensington-Moir, he had former other ex-Bentley drivers Baron André d’Erlanger, Douglas Hawkes and Clive Gallop alongside regular drivers Francis Samuelson and Frank King (also Lagonda sales-manager).

Alvis had also established itself in the British racing scene in the 1920s and was now concentrating on touring-car racing. The new FA12/50 model featured innovative front-wheel drive and could get up to 135 kp/h (85 mph) with its 1.5-litre 50 bhp engine. Two cars were entered for their racing debut, driven by Major Morris Harvey and George Purdy and Sammy Davis (race winner with Bentley) with Bill Urquhart-Dykes. However, only Harvey was really familiar with the different driving style of front-wheel drive.

Salmson was back with just a two-car team but looking to emulate their success in 1927 it was strong on paper. The Grand Sport had proven reliability and was entered in the Biennial Cup with 1927 winners, works drivers Georges Casse and André Rousseau. The team also entered the only supercharged car to get to the starting line. With the new rules permitting blown engines taking effect this year, they were ineligible for the ’27-28 Biennial Cup. The 1.1-litre engine with a Cozette supercharger was equivalent to a 1.43-litre engine and therefore had 20 more laps added to its target distance. It was driven by Jean Hasley / Albert Perrot.

After an acrimonious departure from Salmson in 1923, André Lombard was barred from competing for five years. In that time he founded his open company, Automobiles Lombard, making small voiturettes like Salmson. The first production model was the AL3, designed by Edmond Vareille (another ex-Salmson employee). Low-slung, the standard double-overhead-cam 1.1-litre engine had a 4-speed gearbox and had a top speed of 130 kp/h (80 mph). Lombard got ex-Salmson works driver Lucien Desvaux to drive. A second car arrived for Amilcar co-founder André Morel but did not practice.

A new challenger to Salmson for Index honours this year was Bollack Netter and Co (BNC). Founded in 1923, they started with small, quick cyclecars and then introducing models with bigger engines that proved competitive in racing. Three versions of their new Type H were offered (named after famous race-tracks), including the supercharged “Montlhéry” but it was a regular “Monza” model that was bought to Le Mans. This small 2-seater had a Ruby DS 1100 pushrod engine that put out 30 bhp and a three-speed gearbox. It was driven by regular works driver Michel Doré, along with Jean Treunet.

After a terrible 1927 race, Tracta returned with three of their front-wheel drive cars. Along with an improved Gephi, two new Type A models were entered, one with a 1.5-litre SCAP engine and the other with a 1.1-litre SCAP engine. Once again, team co-founder Jean-Albert Grégoire was driving, choosing the smaller Type A for the ‘27-28 Biennial Cup. Race veterans Maurice Benoist and Louis Balart ran the 1.5-litre car, while Roger Bourcier (injured in the road accident before the previous year’s race) drove the Gephi with the first South American at Le Mans: the Argentine Hector Vasena.

Aston Martin had had a difficult beginning, going through several bankruptcies since it was founded in 1913. The first design of the latest incarnation was the T-Type, which was to lead to the next model, the International. It was a four-seat convertible with a 1.5-litre engine and 4-speed gearbox. Two prototypes came to Le Mans, driven by engineer co-owner Augustus “Bert” Bertelli / George Eyston and Cyril Paul with former Bentley mechanic Jack Besant.

== Practice ==
A number of teams found teething problems in the practice session. Fortunately, Morris Motors had purchased the Léon Bollée factory near Le Mans to produce cars for the French market. It routinely offered its facilities to foreign teams needing repair work and machining. This year, Alvis, Lagonda and Aston Martin availed themselves of that offer to get their cars race-ready. .

== Race ==
=== Start ===
Just before the start of the race, a light squall came across the circuit. But it soon cleared and the weather was fine for the race. From the start the Bentleys were in front, with Birkin taking the lead, ahead of Brisson in the Stutz, Laly's Ariès the four Chryslers and two of the Lagondas. But not d’Erlanger, who had flooded his engine at the start and had been last away.

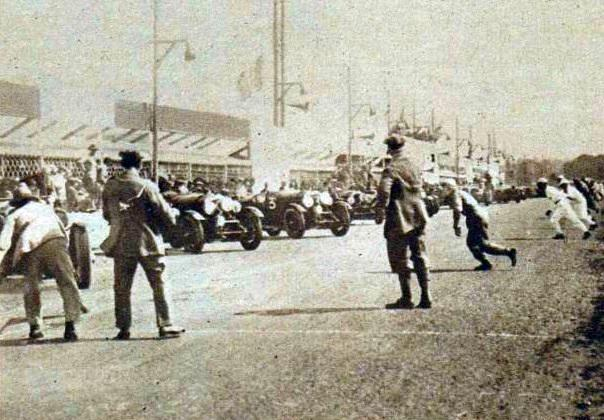
Start of the 1928 race

First to fall was the Ariès, put out after only two laps with engine failure. Soon after, Ledure's Chrysler was in the pits with no radiator water after bolts had come loose on the frame.

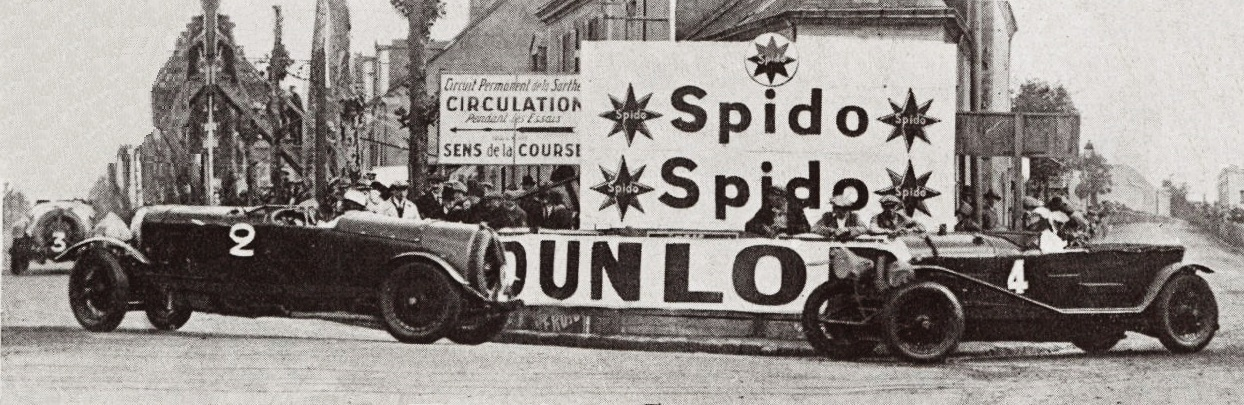
Birkin leading the other two Bentleys out of Pontlieue hairpin

In the opening hour, the pace was torrid and the top four cars successively lowered the lap record. Brisson was able to keep up with the Bentleys but Barnato would not let him pass. It was only when the Stutz team protested the blocking tactics to the officials that Bentley signalled to Barnato to pull over. However, another short shower affected the Stutz's handling, letting Barnato pull away. Samuelson had been driving his Lagonda wildly. Ignoring team orders to slow down, his luck ran out when he went off at Mulsanne corner and planted the car in the sandbank. He was reversing out when he was struck, ironically, by his teammate d’Erlanger, making up time after his delay at the start. The impact pushed Samuelson's car back through the sandbank and into the wooden fence beyond. It took him two hours to dig it out, whereupon he found the gearbox casing was cracked. Furious and bruised, d’Erlanger made it back to the pits where the front brakes and shock absorbers had to be disengaged to continue on.

Shortly before 7pm, the cars started coming in for their first fuel stops and driver changes. But on his due in-lap, Birkin did not arrive. Barnato reported to the team that he had seen Birkin marooned at Mulsanne corner with a puncture. The rubber had wrapped itself around the axle. After 90 minutes of cutting he got the tyre off and tried to drive back on the rim. He got as far as Arnage until the rim collapsed, pushing him off into the roadside ditch. Unable to move the car with just a single jack he ran the 5km back to the pits. Co-driver Chassagne smuggled a second jack out and ran back to take over the repair. He got going eventually but they had lost three hours in the process.

The Alvis team had planned on running 22-laps shifts but were concerned when their cars began sputtering on 19 laps because of their fuel-tank shape. They were both lucky to make it to the 20-lap minimum, forcing a change in the race-strategy. Bertelli had just taken over his Aston Martin when he had to take to the verge to overtake a slower car blocking him. But he hit a deep ditch wrecking his suspension.

Benjafield inherited the lead but it would not last long, as he fell back with an oil-leak in the engine, dropping him to fourth. This left Rubin and Bloch dicing for the lead. After a thrilling hour of close racing it was Bloch, in the Stutz, who was in the lead as night fell.

=== Night ===
Bloch and Brisson kept the Stutz in the lead through the night. Barnato closed in again and Brisson repaid his earlier actions by himself blocking the road, even driving on the road-verge to throw stones up into the closely following Bentley. Later in the night the circuit had bouts of fog and light rain. The Benjafield/Clement Bentley was retired when a water pipe came loose emptying the water pump well before the 20-lap replenishment window. The cause was found to be because the chassis had flexed and broken from the strains of the hard racing.

The three Chryslers continued comfortably in the top-10, until around 3am when Chiron started having trouble with his clutch and fell back. The car was later disqualified when the drivers tried to bump-start the car. Davis had a big moment in the rain when a tyre blew on his Alvis accelerating out of Mulsanne corner. Missing the roadside trees, he managed to limp round to the pits to do the repairs. Having been on schedule as night fell, the supercharged Salmson developed engine problems that meant it was disqualified, alongside one of the SARAs, at the halfway point for insufficient distance. Just before dawn, Barnato and Rubin retook the lead off the Stutz as they stopped for fuel. The Chryslers were third and fourth. The Benoist/Dauvergne Itala, the first of the 2-litres, was close behind with the Alvis cars holding down sixth and seventh.

=== Morning ===
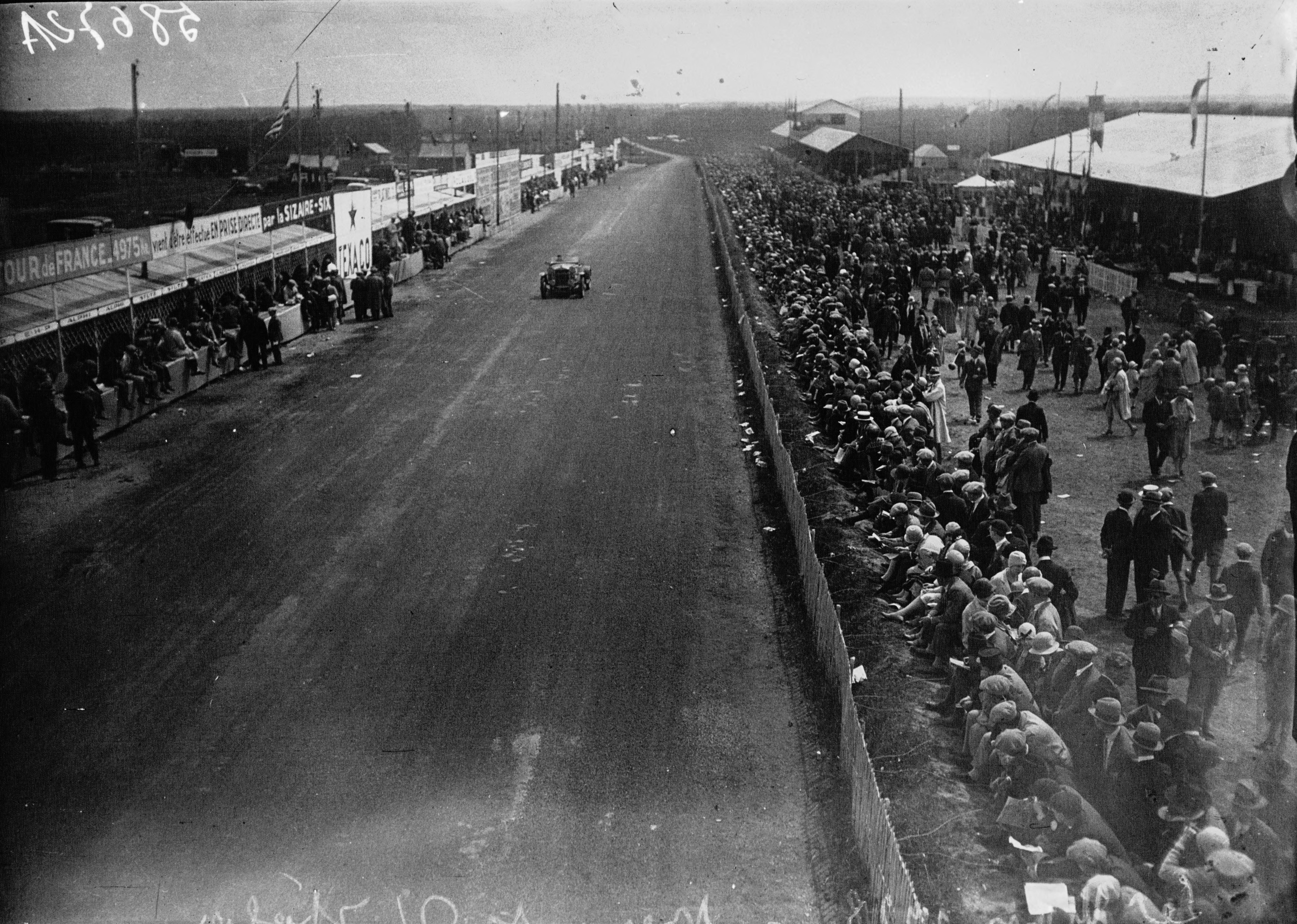
Itala #12 coming down the main straight past the pits

Through the morning the Stutz pursued the British team, but Rubin gradually built a lead. Then not long after midday the green Bentley had to pit with a water leak as the radiator worked loose, also due to a cracked chassis like their sister car. But then soon after the Stutz gearbox started giving trouble jumping out of top gear, and the Frenchmen could not keep up their pace.

At 10 am Benoist was trying to lap an Alvis at the Pontlieue hairpin when both tried outbraking each other. Both had to take the escape road. Benoist only got a hundred metres further when he came to a stop in the middle of the road, possibly with a locked brake. It took an hour for him to get back to the pits and get repairs. Another Alvis puncture dropped Urquhart-Dykes down the order. Then at 2.30pm Brisson came in with no top gear and the Stutz lost two laps in the pits.

=== Finish and post-race ===
In a tense finish, Barnato nursed the Bentley home with an emptying radiator and a rising temperature gauge. He was alarmed to see the Stutz team signal their car to speed up, but Bloch had his own issues with the fragile gearbox. Trying to time his run to the finish, Barnato arrived at the line a minute too early and had to do an extra lap. With water spattering him from the overheating radiator, he dropped to 50 km/h, free-wheeling down slopes and stopping to let the engine cool a bit. The Stutz overtook him, unlapping itself. In the end it took twenty minutes, and the winning margin over the Stutz was only 13 kilometres (8 miles). The pace of the two cars had been such that they easily broke the distance record, going seven laps further than Bloch and Rossignol had in the Lorraine-Dietrich in the 1926 race.

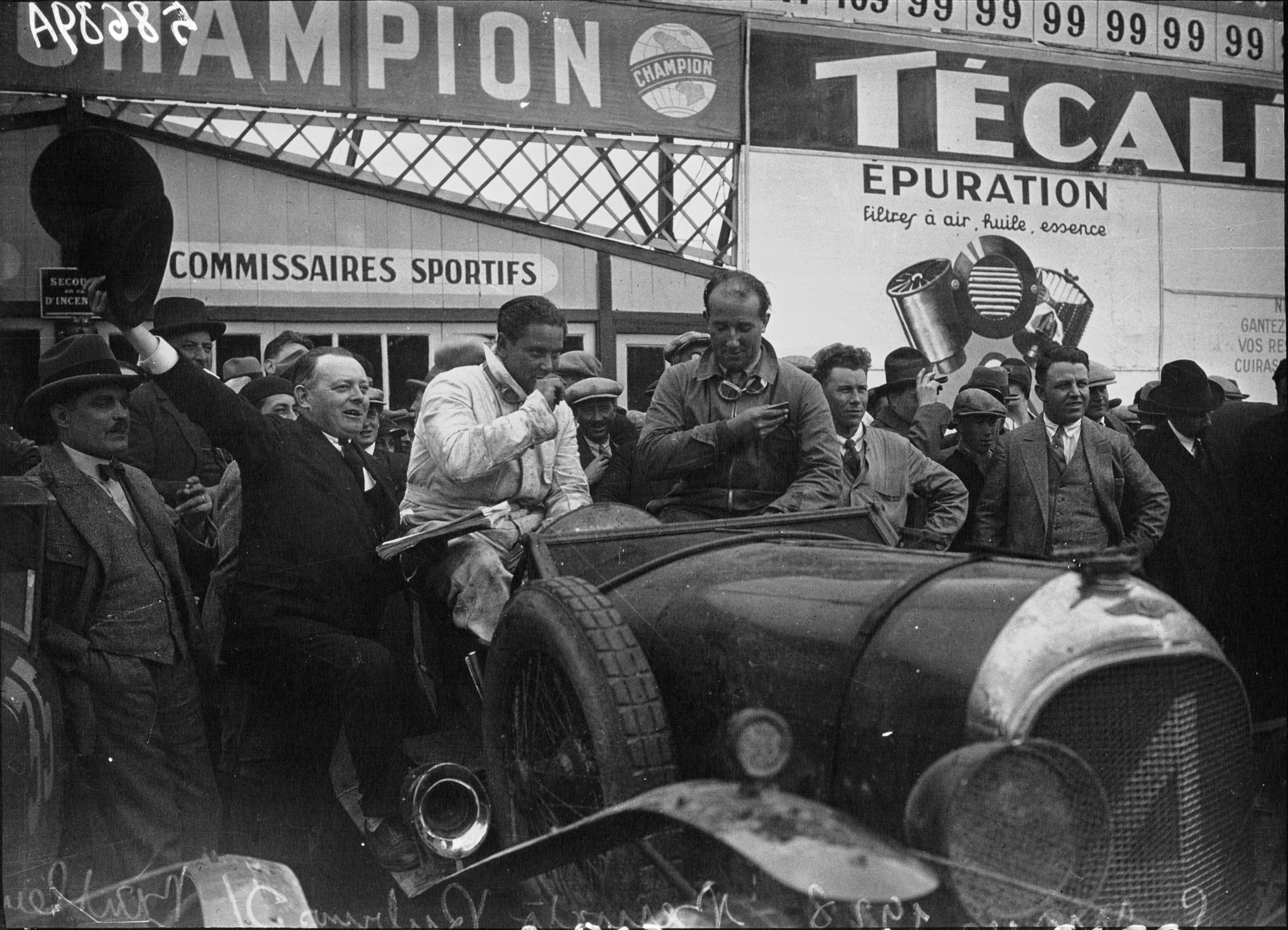
Winners Woolf Barnato and Bernard Rubin

Two of the Chryslers came in third and fourth after trouble-free runs but were well back. The hard-charging Birkin/Chassagne Bentley had come back through the field to finish fifth. Birkin set a new lap record on his final lap, fully 39 seconds faster than the previous year, to just manage to meet their target of 135 laps. After their respective tribulations it was the Alvis of Harvey & Purdy who won the 1.5-litre class (coming in sixth), while the Benoist/Dauvergne Itala had dropped to 8th, but still had a 5-lap advantage over the last Lagonda running to win the 2-litre class. After the time lost from the Saturday night repairs, d’Erlanger/Hawkes had pushed on to finish 11th.

Salmson repeated its previous year's success, coming in tenth overall and again winning the Biennial Cup, romping in and beating their target by 29 laps. However, they were beaten to this year's Index of Performance by the mighty little BNC that beat the same target by 33 laps, coming 7th overall and first French car home.

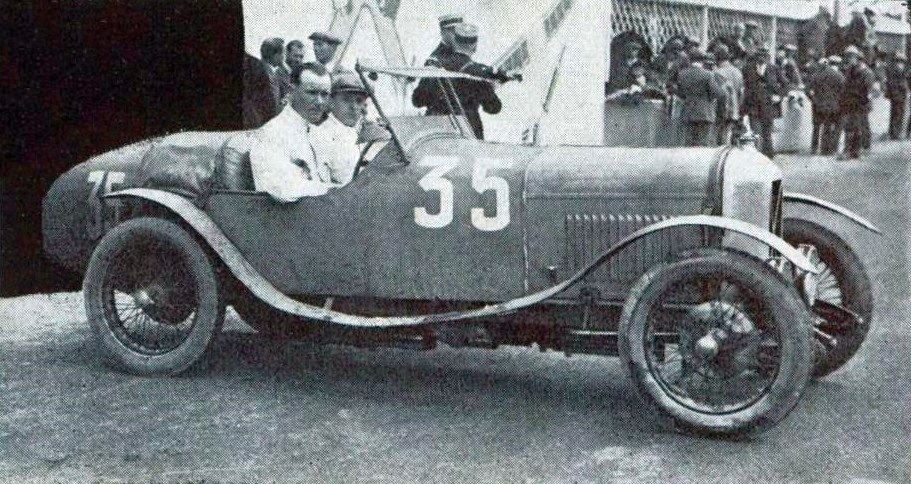
Casse and Rousseau, repeat winners of the Biennial Cup

After a terrible race the previous year, Tracta had a complete reversal of fortune with all three of their cars finishing, the best being their 1.5-litre type A finishing 12th. Interestingly, all the cars of both front-wheel drive teams, Tracta and Alvis, finished the race. E.H.P. came away with their best result at Le Mans, finishing second in the Biennial Cup and beating their previous best distance by nine laps. However, the financial pressure of business downturn and the purchase of Bignan forced the company to close in 1929. The SARA of Duval/Mottet was the one nominated for the Biennial Cup. It was delayed through the middle of the race but they made up time to make their target by the slimmest of margins – calculated by the ACO as only 35 metres on its last lap. In contrast, SCAP lost both their cars in the last few hours, just short of their required distances. Despite launching a larger 2.3-litre car, within a year the company had closed.

After much success in the mid-1920s Salmson closed its racing team in 1929 on this high note, as the grand prix cars were getting outdated and the company was moving out of the crowded fast sports-car market. Unfortunately BNC had invested in larger passenger cars, which did not sell. Bollack and Natter were forced out of their own company at the end of the year when it was bought by businessman Charles de Ricou.

== Official results ==
=== Finishers ===
Results taken from Quentin Spurring's book, officially licensed by the ACO Although there were no official engine classes, the highest finishers in unofficial categories aligned with the Index targets are in Bold text.

Pos	Class **	No.	Team	Drivers	Chassis	Engine	Tyre	Target distance*	Laps
1	**5.0**	**4**	**(United Kingdom) Bentley Motors Ltd**	**(United Kingdom) Woolf Barnato** **(Australia) Bernard Rubin**	Bentley 4½ Litre	Bentley 4.4L S4	D	135	155
2	5.0	1	(France) Société de Carrosserie Weymann	(France) Robert Bloch (France) Édouard Brisson	Stutz Model BB Blackhawk	Stutz 4.9L S8	D	136	154
3	5.0	8	(France) Grand Garage Saint-Didier Paris	(France) André Rossignol (France) Henri Stoffel	Chrysler Six Series 72	Chrysler 4.1L S6	D	134	144
4	5.0	7	(France) Grand Garage Saint-Didier Paris	(Romania) Ionel Ghica-Cantacuzino (Romania) Gheorghe Ghica-Cantacuzino	Chrysler Six Series 72	Chrysler 4.1L S6	D	134	140
5	5.0	3	(United Kingdom) Bentley Motors Ltd	(United Kingdom) Sir Henry “Tim” Birkin (France) Jean Chassagne	Bentley 4½ Litre	Bentley 4.4L S4	D	135	135
6	**1.5**	**27**	**(United Kingdom) Alvis Car and Engineering Company**	**(United Kingdom) Maj Maurice Harvey** **(United Kingdom) Harold Purdy**	Alvis FA12/50	Alvis 1482cc S4	D	111	132
7	**1.1**	**32**	**(France) Bollack Netter et Cie**	**(France) Michel Doré** **(France) Jean Treunet**	BNC Type H Monza	Ruby 1099cc S4	D	99	132
8	**2.0**	**12**	**(Italy) Itala SA Fabbrica Automobili**	**(France) Robert Benoist** **(France) Christian Dauvergne**	Itala Tipo 65 S	Itala 1991cc S6	D	122	131
9	1.5	28	(United Kingdom) Alvis Car and Engineering Company	(United Kingdom) Sammy Davis (United Kingdom) Bill Urquhart-Dykes	Alvis FA12/50	Alvis 1482cc S4	D	111	130
10	1.1	35	(France) Société des Moteurs Salmson	(France) Georges Casse (France) André Rousseau	Salmson Grand Sport	Salmson 1095cc S4	D	99 [B]	128
11	2.0	16	(United Kingdom) Lagonda Motor Co.	(France) Baron André d'Erlanger (United Kingdom) Douglas Hawkes	Lagonda 2 Litre Speed Model	Lagonda 1954cc S4	D	121	126
12	1.5	29	(France) SA des Automobiles Tracta	(France) Louis Balart (France) Maurice Benoist	Tracta Type A	S.C.A.P. 1481cc S4	D	111	119
13	1.1	37	(France) Automobiles Lombard SA	(France) Lucien Desvaux (France) Pierre Goutte	Lombard AL3 Grand Air Sport	Lombard 1093cc S4	E	99	117
14	1.1	36	(France) Établissements Henri Précloux	(France) Guy Bouriat (France) Pierre Bussienne	E.H.P. Type DU	CIME 1094cc S6	D	99 [B]	116
15	2.0	19	(France) Société des Applications à Refroidissements par Air	(France) Gaston Duval (France) Gaston Mottet	S.A.R.A. SP7	S.A.R.A. 1806cc S6	E	115 [B]	115
16	1.1	31	(France) SA des Automobiles Tracta	(France) Roger Bourcier (Argentina) Hector Vasena	Tracta Gephi	S.C.A.P. 1099cc S4	BF	99	110
17	1.1	42	(France) SA des Automobiles Tracta	(France) Jean-Albert Grégoire (France) Fernand Vallon	Tracta Type A	S.C.A.P. 1085cc S4	D	99 [B]	108

=== Did not finish ===
Pos	Class **	No	Team	Drivers	Chassis	Engine	Tyre	Target distance*	Laps	Reason
DNF	1.5	24	(France) Société des Construction; Automobile Parisienne	(France) Henri Guilbert (France) André Lefèbvre	S.C.A.P. Type O	SCAP 1495cc S8	D	111	95	Engine (21 hr)
DNF	1.1	39	(France) Société des Construction; Automobile Parisienne	(France) Lucien Lemesle (France) Henry Godard	S.C.A.P. Type M	SCAP 1087cc S4	D	99 [B]	91	Front axle (20 hr)
DNF	1.5	26	(United Kingdom) Aston Martin Ltd	(United Kingdom) Jack Besant (United Kingdom) Cyril Paul	Aston Martin International	Aston Martin 1495cc S4	D	111	82	Gearbox (17 hr)
DNF	5.0	2	(United Kingdom) Bentley Motors Ltd	(United Kingdom) Frank Clement (United Kingdom) Dr Dudley Benjafield	Bentley 4½ Litre	Bentley 4.4L S4	D	135 [B]	71	Radiator (10 hr)
DSQ	5.0	5	(France) Grand Garage Saint-Didier Paris	(Monaco) Louis Chiron (France) Cyril de Vere	Chrysler Six Series 72	Chrysler 4.1L S6	D	134	66	Bump start (night)
DNF	1.1	41	(France) Société des Automobile Ariès	(France) Fernand Gabriel (France) Louis Paris	Ariès CC4	Ariès 1083cc S4	D	99	51	? (night)
DNF	2.0	14	(Italy) Itala SA Fabbrica Automobili	(France) “Sabipa” (Louis Charavel) (France) “Christian”	Itala Tipo 65 S	Itala 1991cc S6	D	122	50	Engine (night)
DSQ	1.5	21	(France) Automobiles Luart-Poniatowski- Hougardy Ingenieurs	(France) Henri De Costier (France) Sosthene de la Rochefoucauld	Alphi LM	CIME 1496cc S6	D	111	45	Broken panel (night)
DNF	1.5	25	(United Kingdom) Aston Martin Ltd	(United Kingdom) George Eyston (United Kingdom) Augustus ‘Bert’ Bertelli	Aston Martin International	Aston Martin 1495cc S4	D	111	32	Suspension (5 hr)
DSQ	1.5	30	(France) Société des Moteurs Salmson	(France) Jean Hasley (France) Albert Perrot	Salmson Grand Sport	Salmson 1095cc Supercharged S4	D	109	30	Insufficient distance (12 hr)
DSQ	2.0	20	(France) Société des Applications à Refroidissements par Air	(France) Émile Maret (France) Gonzaque Lécureul	S.A.R.A. SP7	S.A.R.A. 1806cc S6	E	115	25	Insufficient distance (12 hr)
DNF	2.0	18	(United Kingdom) Lagonda Motor Co.	(United Kingdom) Capt Clive Gallop (United Kingdom) Maj E.J. Hayes	Lagonda 2 Litre Speed Model	Lagonda 1954cc S4	D	121	23	Radiator (evening)
DNF	1.1	40	(France) Société des Automobile Ariès	(France) Arthur Duray (France) Roger Delano	Ariès CC4	Ariès 1083cc S4	D	99	22	? (evening)
DNF	2.0	15	(United Kingdom) Lagonda Motor Co.	(United Kingdom) Capt Francis Samuelson (United Kingdom) Frank King	Lagonda 2 Litre Speed Model	Lagonda 1954cc S4	D	121	13	Accident (4 hr)
DNF	5.0	6	(France) Grand Garage Saint-Didier Paris	(Belgium) fr:Jacques Édouard Ledure (Italy) Conte Goffredo ‘Freddie’ Zehender	Chrysler Six Series 72	Chrysler 4.1L S6	D	134	5	Radiator (1 hr)
DNF	3.0	9	(France) Société des Automobile Ariès	(France) Robert Laly (France) Louis Rigal	Ariès Type S GP2 Surbaissée	Ariès 3.0L S4	D	130	3	Engine (1 hr)
Sources:

- Note *: [B]= car also entered in the 1927-8 Biennial Cup.
- Note **: There were no official class divisions for this race. These are unofficial categories (used in subsequent years) related to the Index targets.

=== Did not start ===
Pos	Class	No	Team	Drivers	Chassis	Engine	Reason
DNS	3.0	11	(Russia) Boris Ivanowski (private entrant)	(Russia) Boris Ivanowski (Italy) Attilo Marinoni	Alfa Romeo 6C-1500; Super Sport	Alfa Romeo 1487cc Supercharged S6	Failed scrutineering
RES	2.0	17	(United Kingdom) Lagonda Motor Co.	(United Kingdom) Bert Hammond (United Kingdom) W. Handley	Lagonda 2 Litre Speed Model	Lagonda 1954cc S4	Reserve entry
DNA	3.0	10	(France) Société des Automobile Ariès		Ariès Type S GP3	Ariès 3.0L S4	Did not arrive
DNA	2.0	22	(United Kingdom) DMK Marendaz Ltd	(United Kingdom) Capt Donald Marendaz (United Kingdom) P. Densham	Marendaz Special 11/55	Anzani 1496cc S4	Did not arrive
DNA	1.1	23	(France) Société des Construction; Automobile Parisienne		S.C.A.P. Type O	SCAP 1495cc S8	Did not arrive
DNA	1.1	33	(France) Cyclecars D’Yrsan	(France) . Simas (France) . Ego	D’Yrsan Grand Sport	Ruby 1097cc S4	Did not arrive
DNA	1.1	34	(France) Cyclecars D’Yrsan	(France) Marquis Raymond Siran de Caranac (France) . de Soussay	D’Yrsan Grand Sport	Ruby 1097cc S4	Did not arrive
DNA	1.1	38	(France) Automobiles Lombard SA		Lombard AL3 Grand Air Sport	Lombard 1093cc S4	Withdrawn
DNA	750	43	(United Kingdom) E. Gordon-England (private entrant)		Austin 7	Austin 748cc S4	Did not arrive

=== 1927-28 Coupe Biennale Rudge-Whitworth ===
Pos	Class	No.	Team	Drivers	Chassis	1928 Index Result
1	1.1	35	(France) Société des Moteurs Salmson	(France) Georges Casse (France) André Rousseau	Salmson Grand Sport	1.300
2	1.1	36	(France) Établissements Henri Précloux	(France) Guy Bouriat (France) Pierre Bussienne	E.H.P. Type DU	1.177
3	1.1	42	(France) SA des Automobiles Tracta	(France) Jean-Albert Grégoire (France) Fernand Vallon	Tracta Type A	1.103
4	2.0	19	(France) Société des Applications à Refroidissements par Air	(France) Gaston Duval (France) Gaston Mottet	S.A.R.A. SP7	1.000

=== 1928 index of performance (Prix Saint-Didier) ===
Pos	Class	No.	Team	Drivers	Chassis	Index result
1	1.1	32	(France) Bollack Netter et Cie	(France) Michel Doré (France) Jean Treunet	BNC Type H Monza	1.333
2	1.1	35	(France) Société des Moteurs Salmson	(France) Georges Casse (France) André Rousseau	Salmson Grand Sport	1.300
3	1.5	27	(United Kingdom) Alvis Car and Engineering Co.	(United Kingdom) Maurice Harvey (United Kingdom) Harold Purdy	Alvis FA12/50	1.189
4	1.1	37	(France) Automobiles Lombard SA	(France) Lucien Desvaux (France) Pierre Goutte	Lombard AL3 Grand Air Sport	1.182
5	1.1	36	(France) Établissements Henri Précloux	(France) Guy Bouriat (France) Pierre Bussienne	E.H.P. Type DU	1.177
6	1.5	28	(United Kingdom) Alvis Car and Engineering Co.	(United Kingdom) Sammy Davis (United Kingdom) Bill Urquhart-Dykes	Alvis FA12/50	1.171
7	5.0	4	(United Kingdom) Bentley Motors Ltd	(United Kingdom) Woolf Barnato (Australia) Bernard Rubin	Bentley 4½ Litre	1.148
8	5.0	1	(France) Société de Carrosserie Weymann	(France) Robert Bloch (France) Édouard Brisson	Stutz Model BB Blackhawk	1.132
9	1.1	31	(France) SA des Automobiles Tracta	(France) Roger Bourcier (Argentina) Hector Vasena	Tracta Gephi	1.111
10	1.1	42	(France) SA des Automobiles Tracta	(France) Jean-Albert Grégoire (France) Fernand Vallon	Tracta Type A	1.103

- Note: Only the top ten positions are included in this set of standings.

=== Highest finisher in class ===
Class	Winning car	Winning drivers
5 to 8-litre	no entrants	
3 to 5-litre	#4 Bentley 4½ Litre	Barnato / Rubin *
2 to 3-litre	no finishers	
1500 to 2000cc	#12 Itala Tipo 65 S	Benoist / Dauvergne
1100 to 1500cc	#27 Alvis FA 12/50	Harvey / Purdy *
750 to 1100cc	#32 BNC type H Monza	Doré / Treunet *

- Note *: setting a new class distance record.
- There were no official class divisions for this race and these are the highest finishers in unofficial categories (used in subsequent years) related to the Index targets.

=== Statistics ===
- Fastest lap – H. Birkin, #3 Bentley 4½ Litre – 8:07secs; 127.60 km/h (79.29 mph)
- Winning distance – 2,669.27 km (1,658.61 mi)
- Winner's average speed – 111.22 km/h (69.11 mph)

Citations
