= Jean-Albert Grégoire =

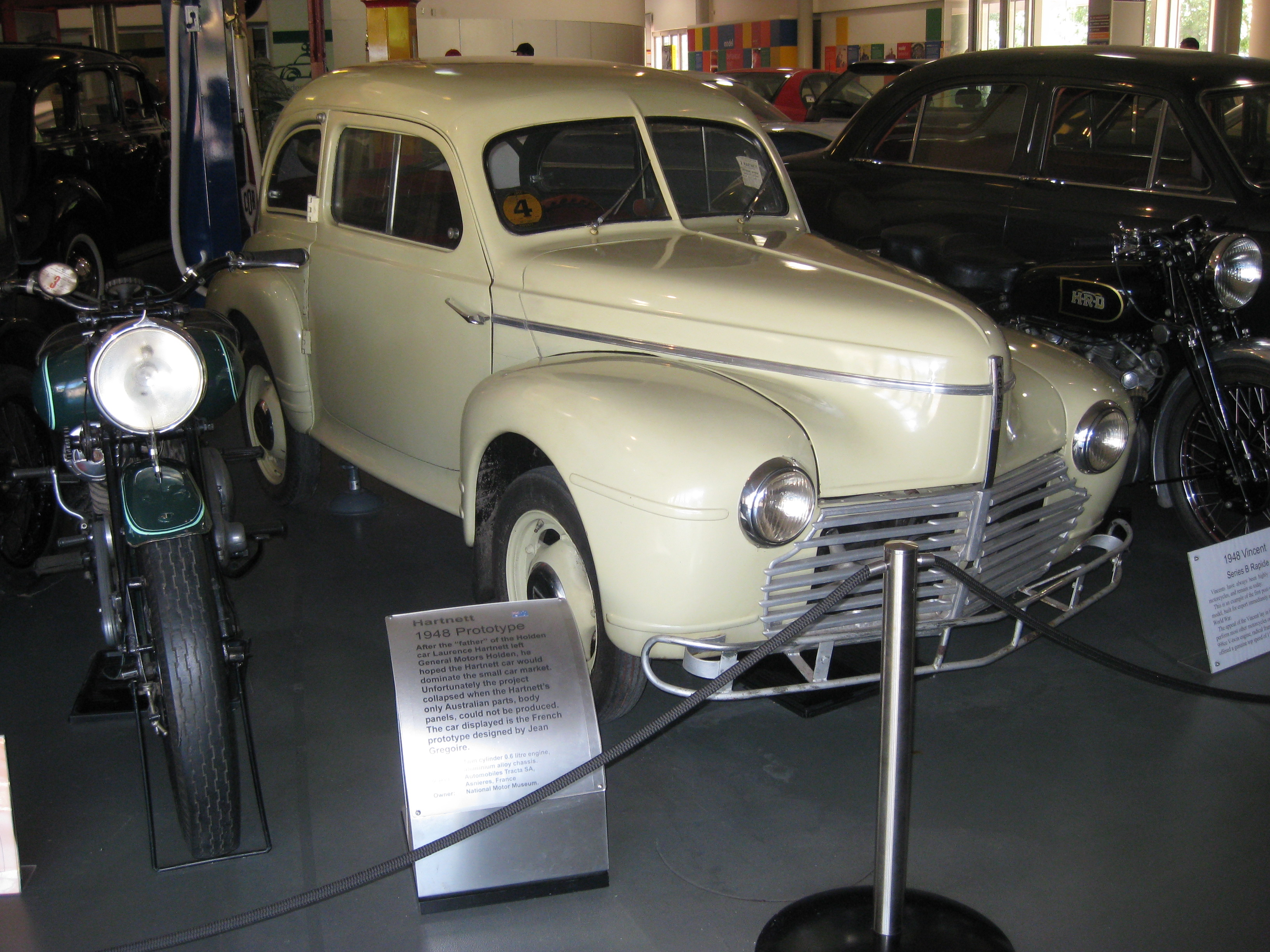
The 1948 prototype of the Hartnett was designed by Grégoire

Jean-Albert Grégoire (7 July 1899 in Paris – 19 August 1992) was one of the great pioneers of the front-wheel-drive car. He contributed to the development of front-wheel-drive vehicles in two ways. The first way was in developing and promoting the Tracta joint (designed by his friend Pierre Fenaille), which was, until manufacturing techniques had progressed sufficiently to allow the successful manufacture of the constant velocity joints commonly in use today, the preferred choice of most manufactures of vehicles that had driven front wheels. Tracta joints were used by many of the pioneers of front-wheel drive, including DKW between 1929 and 1936 and Adler from 1932 to 1939 as well as the cars designed by J A Grégoire that will be mentioned later. The Tracta joint was fitted to most of the military vehicles that had driven front wheels used by most of the combatants in the Second World War. They included Laffly and Panhard in France, Alvis and Daimler in the UK and Willys in the United States that used the joint in a quarter of a million Jeeps and many others. This was to continue after the war, the first Land Rover being so fitted.

The second way he contributed to the development of front-wheel-drive vehicles was in designing and in some cases manufacturing front-wheel-drive cars. The Tracta Gephi was his first design and it was this car that inspired him to design a constant velocity joint. All subsequent Tracta cars, and there were about two hundred manufactured between 1927 and 1932, used it. The first of these was raced at Le Mans in 1927 completing the 24-hour race. The Tracta cars used engines from S.C.A.P. from 1100 cc to 1600 cc, and Continental and Hotchkiss, from 2700 cc to 3300 cc.

J.A. Grégoire designed an 11cv 6-cylinder car for Donnet in 1932. Only four prototypes were produced, one being shown at the Paris Salon of 1932 before Donnet went into liquidation. He then worked with Lucian Chenard to design two cars for Chenard et Walcker. They were of advanced design but were not a commercial success. In 1937 he designed the Amilcar Compound, produced by Hotchkiss from 1938 to the Second World War, by which time 681 examples had been made. It was constructed using another of Grégoire's ideas, a cast Alpax (light alloy) chassis frame. Other advanced features were rack and pinion steering and all independent suspension. But the car had its bad points, cable brakes and gear-change linkage and a side-valve engine although the latter was still common at this time. An overhead valve version came later. During the Second World War he secretly worked with his design team at his works at Asnières-sur-Seine on a small car the Aluminium "Francais-Grégoire". It had a chassis-body frame of light alloy, front-wheel drive, an air-cooled flat twin engine and independent suspension on all wheels. A four-seat car weighing only 880 pounds (400 kg) and could reach 60 mph (97 km/h) while returning 70 mpg. This design was to form the basis of the 1950 "Dyna" Panhard. In 1950 another Hotchkiss car the Hotchkiss Grégoire, was produced again with an alloy chassis and body. With independent suspension on all four wheels and fitted with a water-cooled flat four engine of 2 litres, ahead of the front axle, it was fast, with a top speed of 94 mph (151 km/h), but the car was expensive and only 250 examples were made by 1954. In 1956 Grégoire produced a two-seat convertible with a 2.2-litre supercharged flat-four engine producing 130 PS (96 kW; 128 hp) and, as in the case of the cars mentioned previously, front-wheel drive. All ten cars made were fitted with bodies designed and built by Henri Chapron.

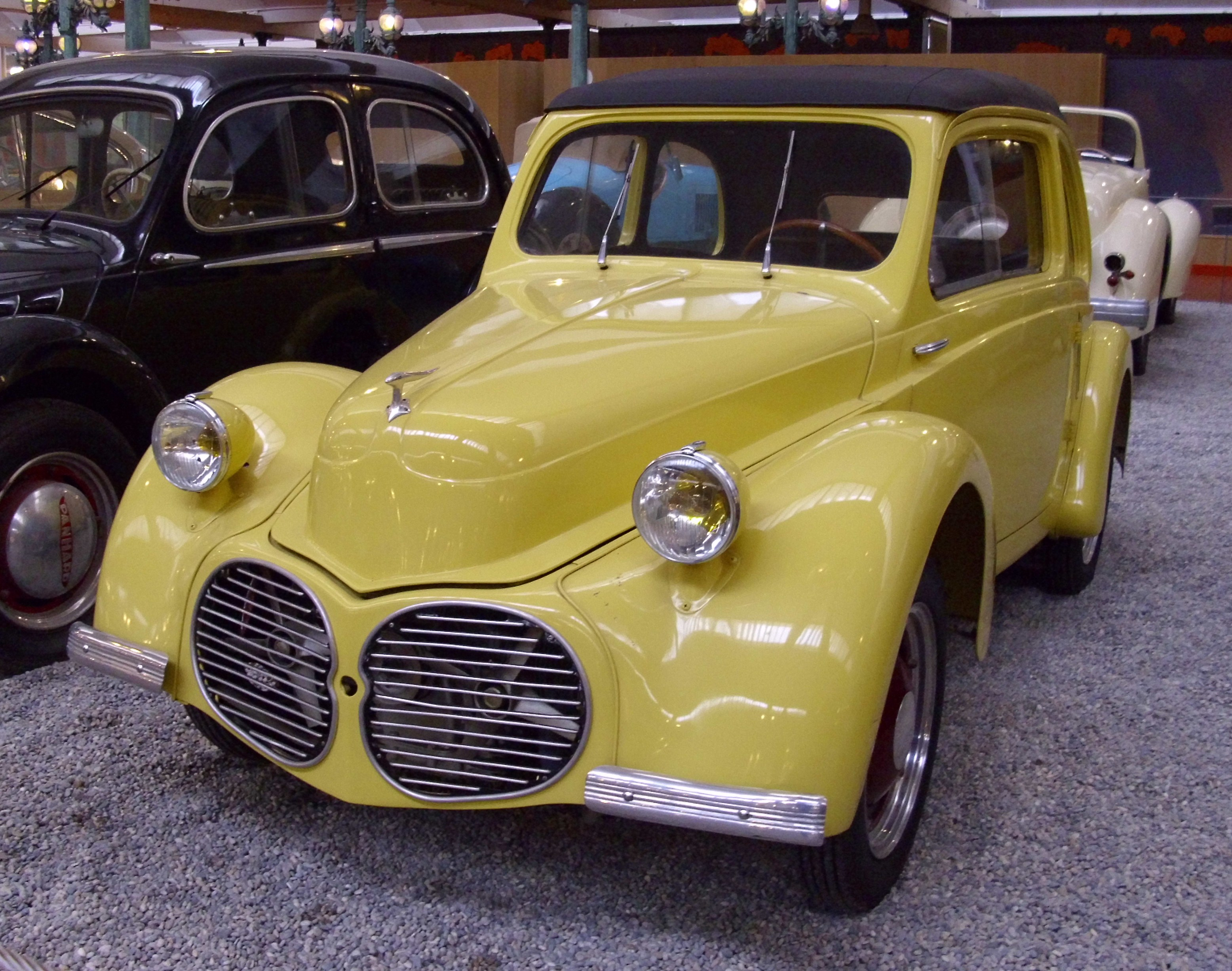
The 1941 Aluminium "Francais-Grégoire"

All the cars mentioned previously were front-wheel-drive cars. Grégoire also designed a couple of rear-wheel-drive machines: the first electric car with the machinery in the mid-engine position and a gas turbine car, the experimental SOCEMA-Grégoire with a front-engined, rear-wheel drive layout.
