= Bernard Rubin =

Australian racing driver (1896–1936)

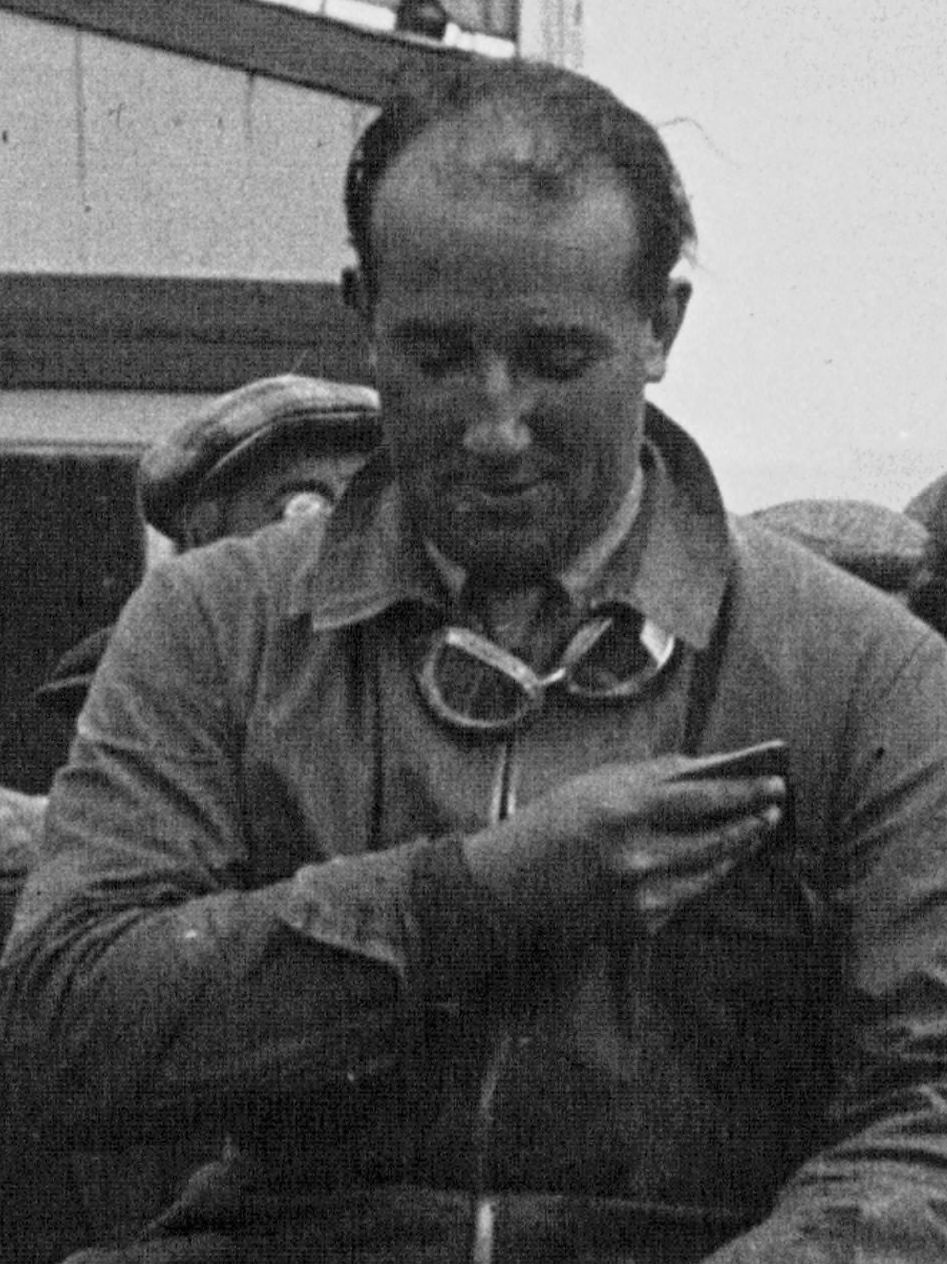
- Bernard Rubin at the 1928 24 Hours of Le Mans
- Nationality: (Australia) Australian
- Born: 6 December 1896; Melbourne, Victoria, Australia
- Died: 27 June 1936 (aged 39); England

24 Hours of Le Mans career
- Years: 1928-1929
- Teams: Bentley Motors
- Best finish: 1st (1928)
- Class wins: 1 (1928)

Bernard Rubin (6 December 1896 – 27 June 1936) was an Australian racing driver and pilot who was a member of the "Bentley Boys" team at the Bentley Motor Company and winner of the 1928 24 Hours of Le Mans.

== Personal life ==
The son of Australian pearl salesman Mark Rubin (1867 – 1919), Bernard was born in the Melbourne suburb of Carlton, before he eventually moved to London with his family in 1908. His mother was the former Rebecca de Vahl Davis, who came from a notable Jewish Melbourne family. He had a brother, well-known grazier, art collector and philanthropist Harold de Vahl Rubin (1899–1964). His uncle, wealthy entrepreneur Abraham de Vahl Davis (1864 – 1912), went down with the steamship SS Koombana after having purchased the legendary – and presumably cursed – Roseate Pearl on behalf of Bernard's father, the Broome Pearler Mark Rubin. On 29 March 1935, in Paris, Rubin married Audrey Mary Simpson, daughter of Charles Ringham Simpson.

Rubin served in the Royal Garrison Artillery in World War I and then the Royal Flying Corps where he was badly injured and required three years of treatment before he could walk again. Following his father's death in 1919, Rubin began purchasing properties in Australia's Northern Territory, before his interest in auto racing developed in 1928.

== Motorsports ==
Rubin became close friends with Woolf Barnato, the director of Bentley Motors, and even lived together for some time. Rubin made his driving debut at Brooklands in 1928 where he finished in sixth place before he made his first appearance at the 24 Hours of Le Mans. Rubin and Barnato won the event in a Bentley 4½ Litre, despite the car being damaged during the race. He remained at Bentley for Le Mans in 1929, but his car failed after only seven laps.

Rubin was the first Australian to win the 24 Hours of Le Mans. As at 2017, four Australians have won Le Mans: Rubin (1928), Vern Schuppan (1983), Geoff Brabham (1993) and David Brabham (2009).

In July 1929, Rubin came eighth in the Irish Grand Prix. In August 1929, he was injured when his Bentley overturned during the RAC Tourist Trophy on the first lap. With his injuries, Rubin turned to team ownership, and helped fund fellow "Bentley Boy" Henry Birkin's racing efforts. In 1933, they shared the wheel of an MG K3 in the famed Mille Miglia race and won their class before Birkin raced Rubin's Alfa Romeo with George Eyston and Whitney Straight. Birkin later drove Rubin's Maserati 3000 in the Tripoli Grand Prix in May 1933 during which, while reaching over for a cigarette during a pit stop, he burnt his forearm on the exhaust and died five weeks later.

In April 1934, Rubin flew to Australia in a Leopard Moth with test-pilot K.F.H. Waller to get familiar with the route and arrangements for the Centenary Air Race from Mildenhall to Melbourne in October same year. Their return flight of 8 days, 12 hours was not officially timed but was ten hours faster than Jim Mollison's World Record. He entered his Bentley-green de Havilland Comet in the air race but was unable to compete due to severe illness. Waller and former Royal Navy pilot Owen Cathcart-Jones finished fourth in the green Comet and, returning to England, set a round-trip record of 130 flying hours. They also set a new record Darwin-London of 130 hours total and for this earned a Royal Aero Club silver medal.

Rubin died in England of pulmonary tuberculosis in 1936. His body was taken back to Australia, where he is buried in Fawkner Crematorium and Memorial Park, Melbourne.

== Career results ==
=== Complete 24 Hours of Le Mans results ===
Year	Team	Co-drivers	Car	Class	Laps	Pos.	Class pos.
1928	(United Kingdom) Bentley Motors Ltd.	(United Kingdom) Woolf Barnato	Bentley 4½ Litre	5.0	154	1st	1st
1929	(United Kingdom) Bentley Motors Ltd.	(United Kingdom) Lord Howe	Bentley 4½ Litre	5.0	7	DNF	DNF

== Sources ==
- "Rubin, Mark (1867–1919)". Rubin, Mark (1867? – 1919) Biographical Entry. Australian Dictionary of Biography Online. 1988.
- "Bernard Rubin". Benjafield Racing Club. Archived from the original on 10 January 2008.

Sporting positions
Preceded by Dudley Benjafield; Sammy Davis	Winner of the 24 Hours of Le Mans; 1928 with: Woolf Barnato	Succeeded by Woolf Barnato; Tim Birkin
