= Henri Chapron =

French coachbuilder (1886–1978)

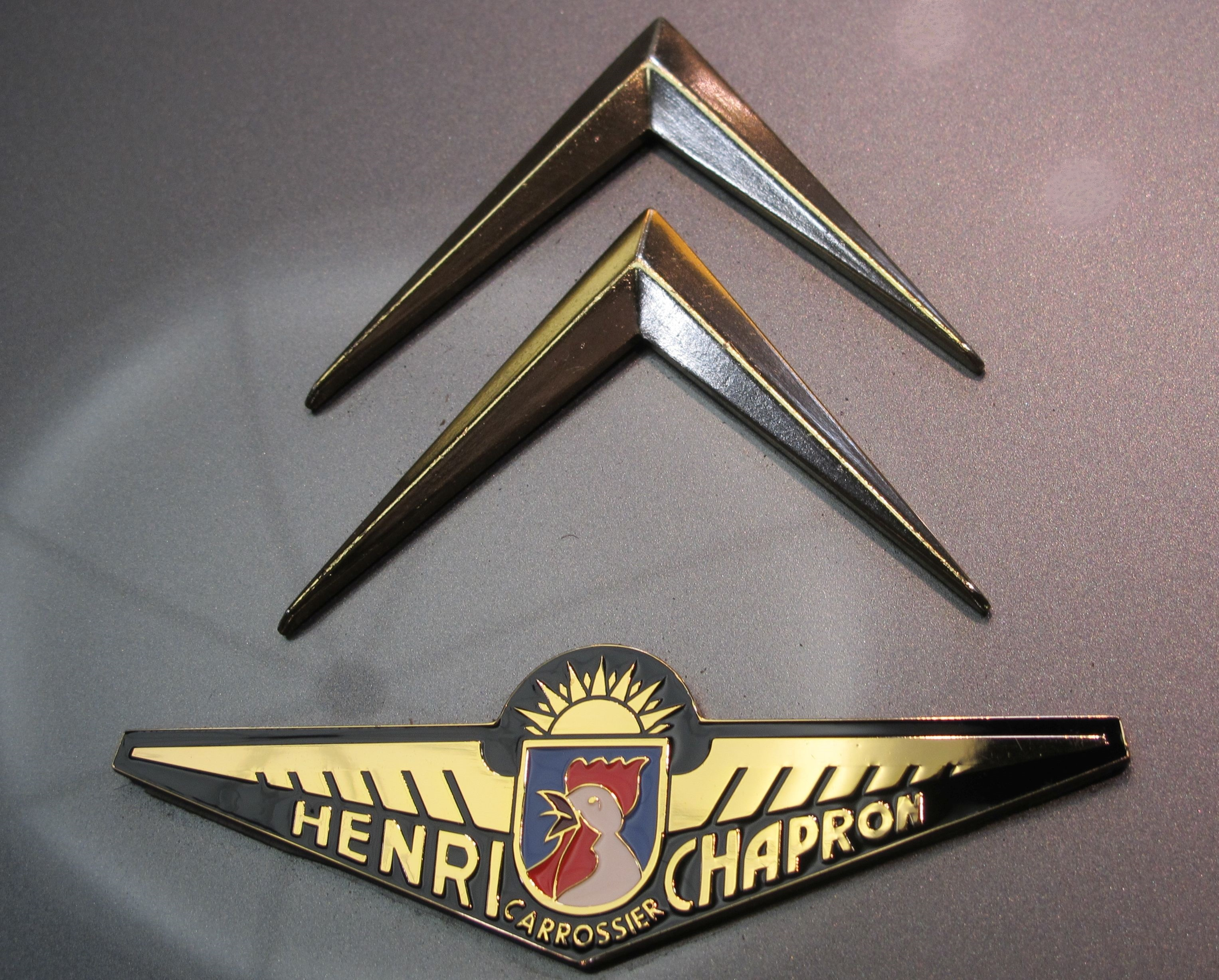
A Henri Chapron badge

Henri Chapron (30 December 1886 - 14 May 1978) was a prominent French automobile coachbuilder. His carrosserie, created in 1919, was located in the Paris suburb of Levallois-Perret.

== History ==
Chapron was born in Nouan-le-Fuzelier (Sologne), and began his career developing custom body designs for French luxury vehicles, like Talbot, Delage, and Delahaye, in the 1920s.

France ceased building vehicles of this type in the 1950s, due to tax legislation that made luxury vehicles prohibitively expensive in France.

=== Citroën DS specials ===
Chapron switched his attention to the recently launched Citroën DS. Chapron’s first rebodied DS coupe was the 1958 Le Paris. At first, Chapron purchased these vehicles and customised them as one-off creations. Many of these became unique convertible variants. His DS convertible caused a sensation at the 1958 Motor Show. Citroën managers came to see him in Levallois to offer him a production agreement. For two years, the Chapron and Citroën teams worked hand in hand in order to strengthen the safety standards on the car and to minimize the cost of production. On the basis of a design by DS designer Flaminio Bertoni, Chapron developed a two-door convertible body that was sold through the Citroën dealer network. The Series convertible was presented at the 1960 Paris Motor Show.

The official collaboration with Citroën began in 1961. A news item in the 20 July 1961 Daily Variety noted that Cary Grant had "telephoned the French automotive company, Citroën, to order a new car for use in the film" That Touch of Mink. The factory reportedly shipped “the display model” to the studio without hesitation and the car is prominently featured in the film, garnering key publicity for the model.

Chapron built this "Décapotable usine" (factory convertible) - 1,365 cars in all. This allowed buyers to benefit from a factory warranty on Usine convertibles purchased. The factory convertibles used a DS platform supplied by Citroën, which included all of the mechanics, front fenders, windshield and wheels. Chapron used the full chassis, but reinforced various elements in the floor area. The doors of the standard sedan have been lengthened by 18 cm; Chapron remade the rear fenders.

Chapron continued making his own DS based vehicles, including the Croisette, Palm Beach, Le Dandy, Lorraine, and Le Leman. Unlike the factory convertibles, Chapron usually used a six centimeter lower windshield for his own models. The side windows - including the rear ones - could be lowered manually or electrically, unlike the factory car. A trained salesman and connoisseur, Henri Chapron wanted the finest leathers. While Citroën bought its leathers from Costil in Pont Audemer, Chapron ordered his from Connolly in England.

In 1968, Chapron made a special extended DS Presidential model for the government of Charles de Gaulle. In 1972, Chapron delivered two SM Presidential models to the government of Georges Pompidou. These gigantic four-door convertibles were first used for the 1972 visit of Queen Elizabeth II to France and continued in use through the inauguration of Jacques Chirac in 1995. The Presidentielle was pressed into service again in 2004, when Queen Elizabeth II reviewed troops on the Champs Elysees with Chirac 5 April 2004, at the start of the queen's three-day state visit to France to mark 100 years of formal friendship between France and Britain. The Entente Cordiale, signed in London on April 8, 1904, resolved a number of colonial disputes and helped to forge an alliance against a resurgent Germany.

=== Citroën SM specials ===
The Citroën SM Mylord was designed as a two-door full convertible - i.e. without a roll bar. It was given a notchback body with a small trunk lid, which at the rear end authentically took up the design of the original vehicle - especially the raised license plate. The prototype of the Mylord was presented at the Paris Motor Show in 1971, and sales began a year later. Production was complex, beginning with Chapron receiving a standard body shell from Chausson. The technology and the floor pan of the SM Coupé remained essentially unchanged; the wheelbase was also retained. The B and C pillars were removed, after which Chapron installed extensive reinforcements in the body area. The modified body was transported to Citroën, where the engine, chassis and other technical components were installed. Finally, the car was brought back to Chapron's workshop to do the interior and paint it. Overall, only a few Mylord convertibles were made; the sources vary between seven and eight copies. What is certain is that four vehicles were sold in France; two more went to Spain, one to the United Kingdom.

One year after the Mylord Cabriolet, Chapron developed a sedan version of the production SM, the Opera. Chapron developed a sedan that remained true to the design of the original model and ultimately represented an extended version of the SM Coupé. Starting with an SM body-in-white, Chapron extended the wheelbase considerably. The front doors have been shortened and some modifications have been made in the area of the belt line. The rear doors were an in-house design by Chapron. They took up the lines of the coupé and also had the characteristic kink in front of the C-pillar. Finally, Chapron removed the large tailgate and replaced it with a notchback construction. The rear, in turn, corresponded to the design of the coupé. The vehicle was very heavy and had lost some of the maneuverability of the coupé. The Citroën SM Opera was presented to the public at the 1972 Paris Motor Show. In the following two years, Chapron manufactured a total of eight Opera sedans. At least two of them are still preserved. One vehicle that is in excellent condition is in the Netherlands, another is in Germany.

=== After Chapron's death ===
Henri Chapron died in Paris in 1978, and the company itself survived for some time under the direction of his widow. Less than five months after Chapron's own death the company presented a Landaulet bodied conversion constructed for a rich Dutch customer, based on a lengthened Peugeot 604. There were hopes this might lead to a low but steady production of similar conversions, as had happened with Chapron's lengthened specials based on the Citroën DS. That did not happen, but the company did produce some special luxury versions (including landaulets) of the Citroën CX with lavishly equipped interiors.

The Chapron workshops prepared several Landaulet (car) vehicles based on the CX 2400 Prestige, including a wedding car, delivered in 1981 and used for the first time for the wedding of Henri de Passau, Prince of Bourbon Parma and Grand Heir and Maria Teresa Grand Duchess. It was then used for the wedding of King Harald V of Norway, the Crown Prince of Norway, and Archduke Christian of Austria and Princess Marie Astrid, and finally Prince Nicolas of Liechtenstein and Princess Margaretha of Luxembourg for their respective weddings.

In the 2018 Pebble Beach Concours d'Elegance, Citroën appeared as a featured marque and was represented by many Chapron variants.

A few of Chapron's custom bodies

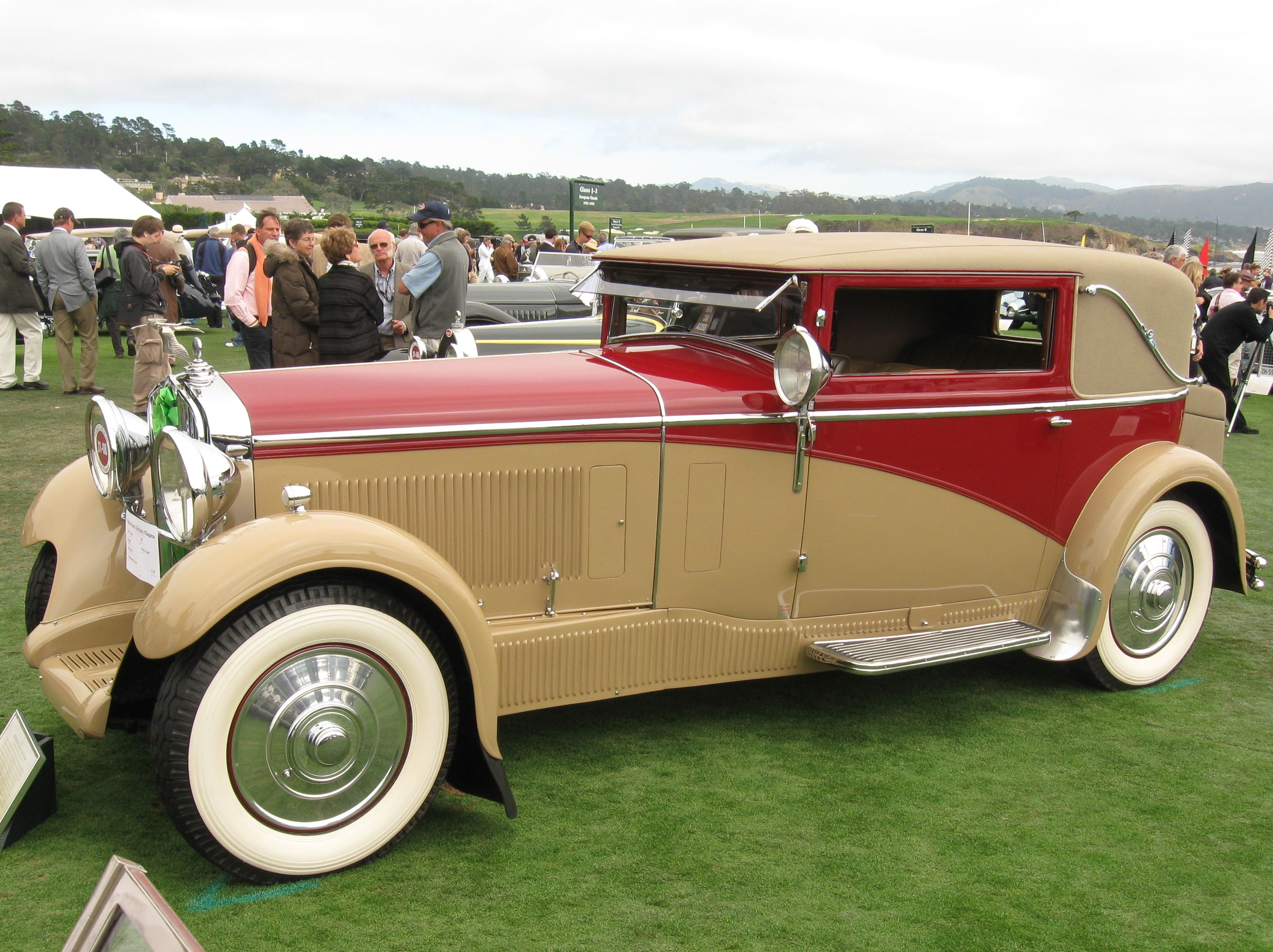
1931 Delage D8 by Henri Chapron

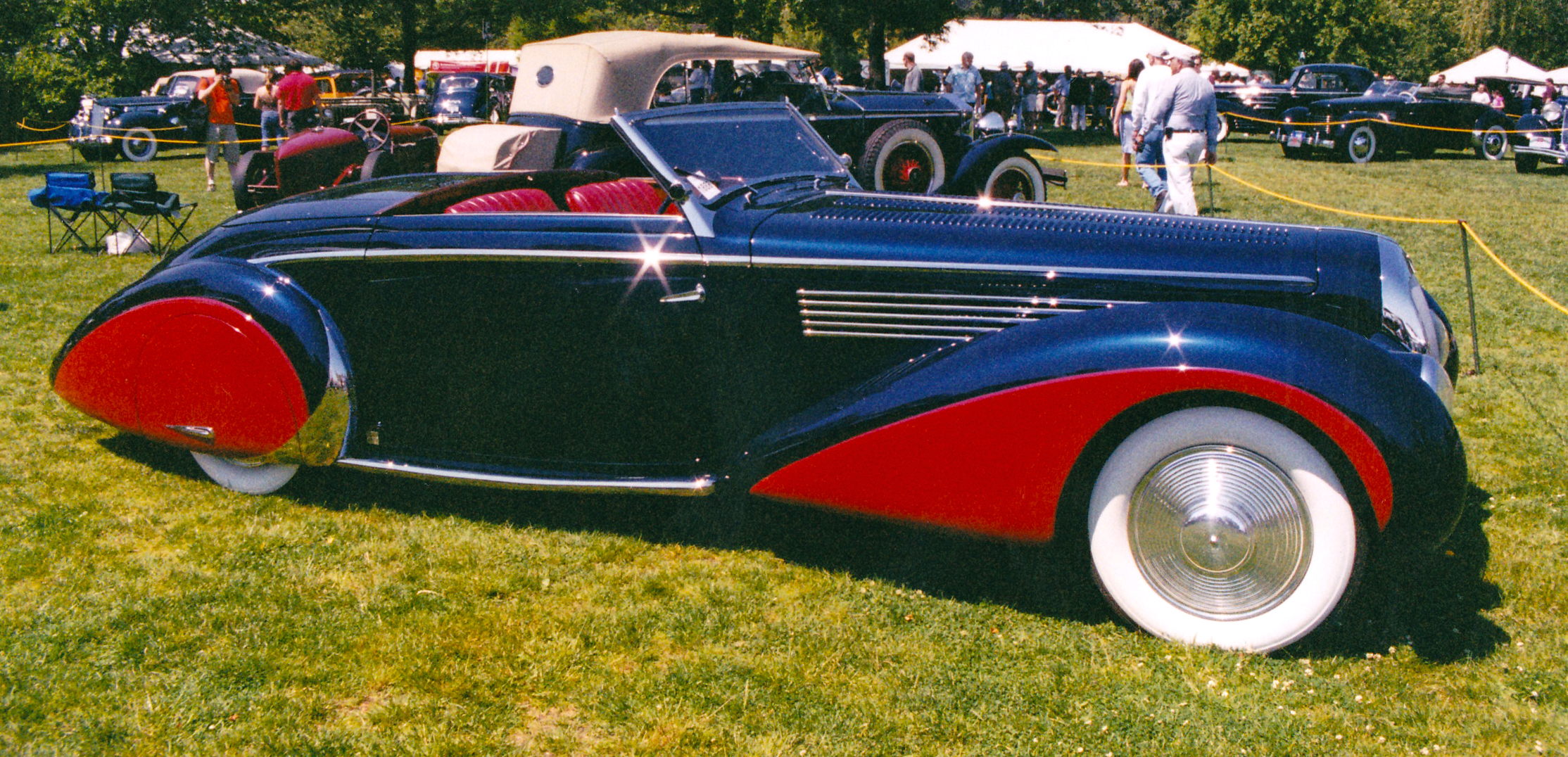
A Delage D8 rebodied by Chapron in 1948

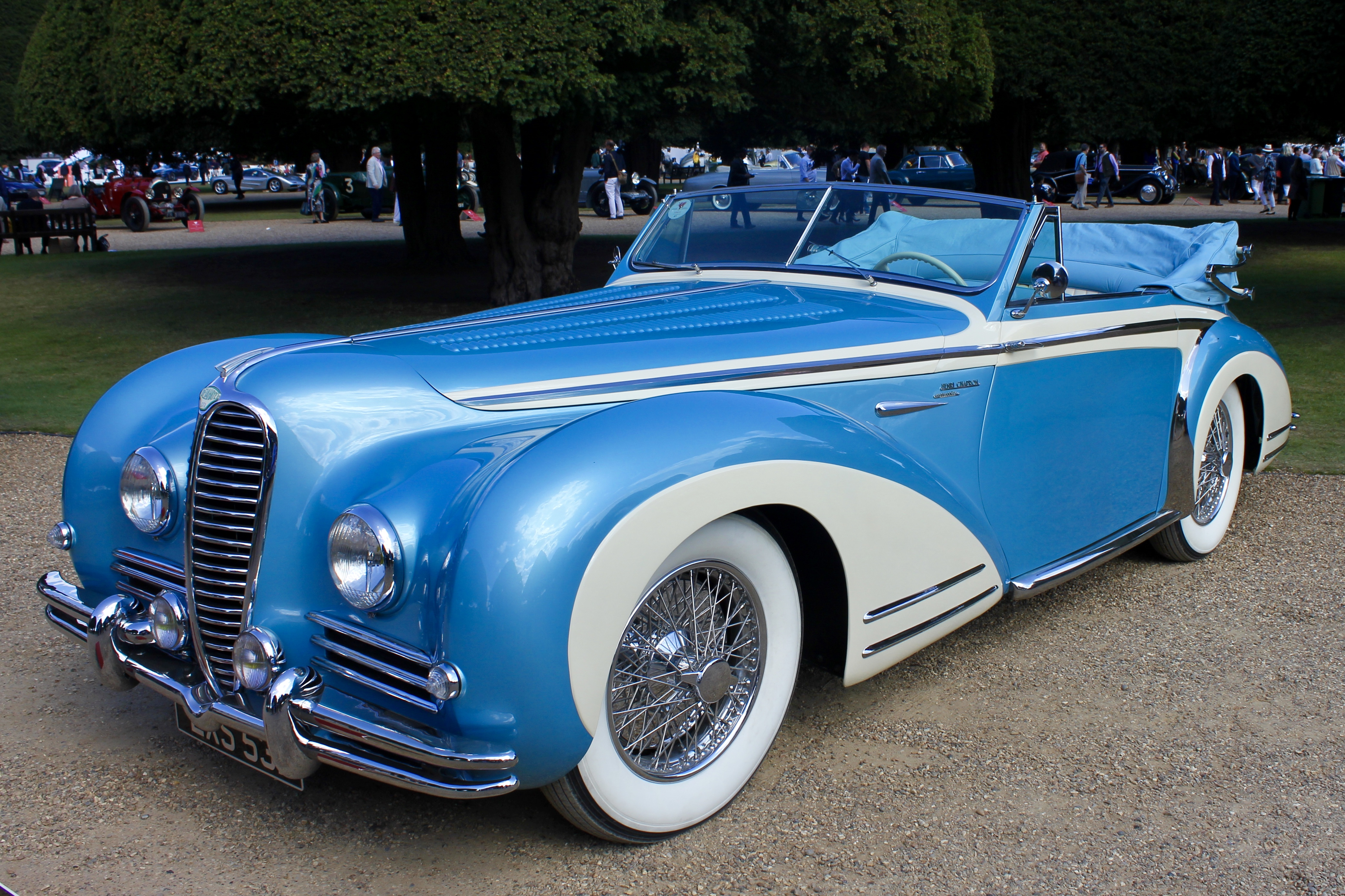
1948 Delahaye 175 S by Chapron

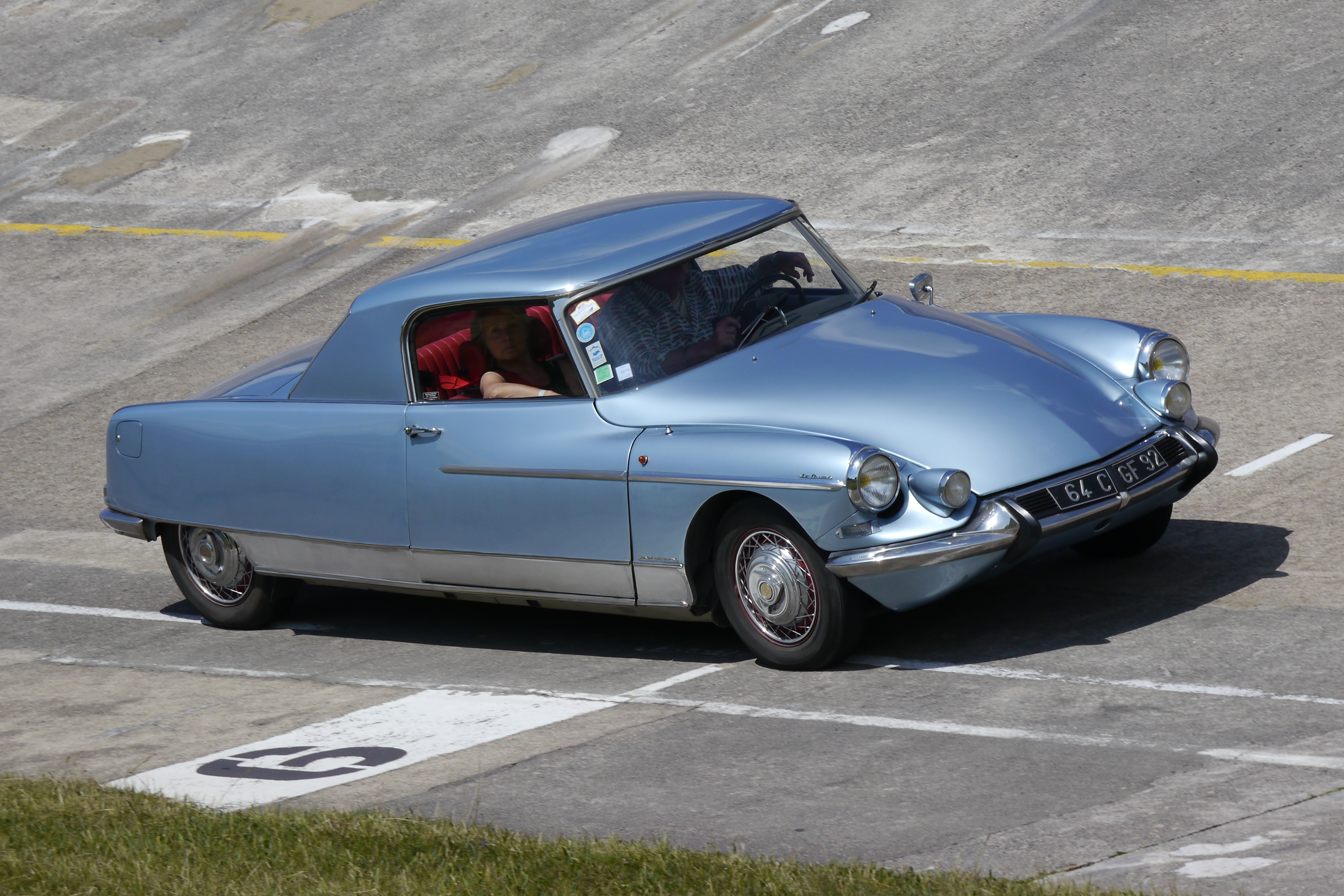
1963 Citroën Le Dandy

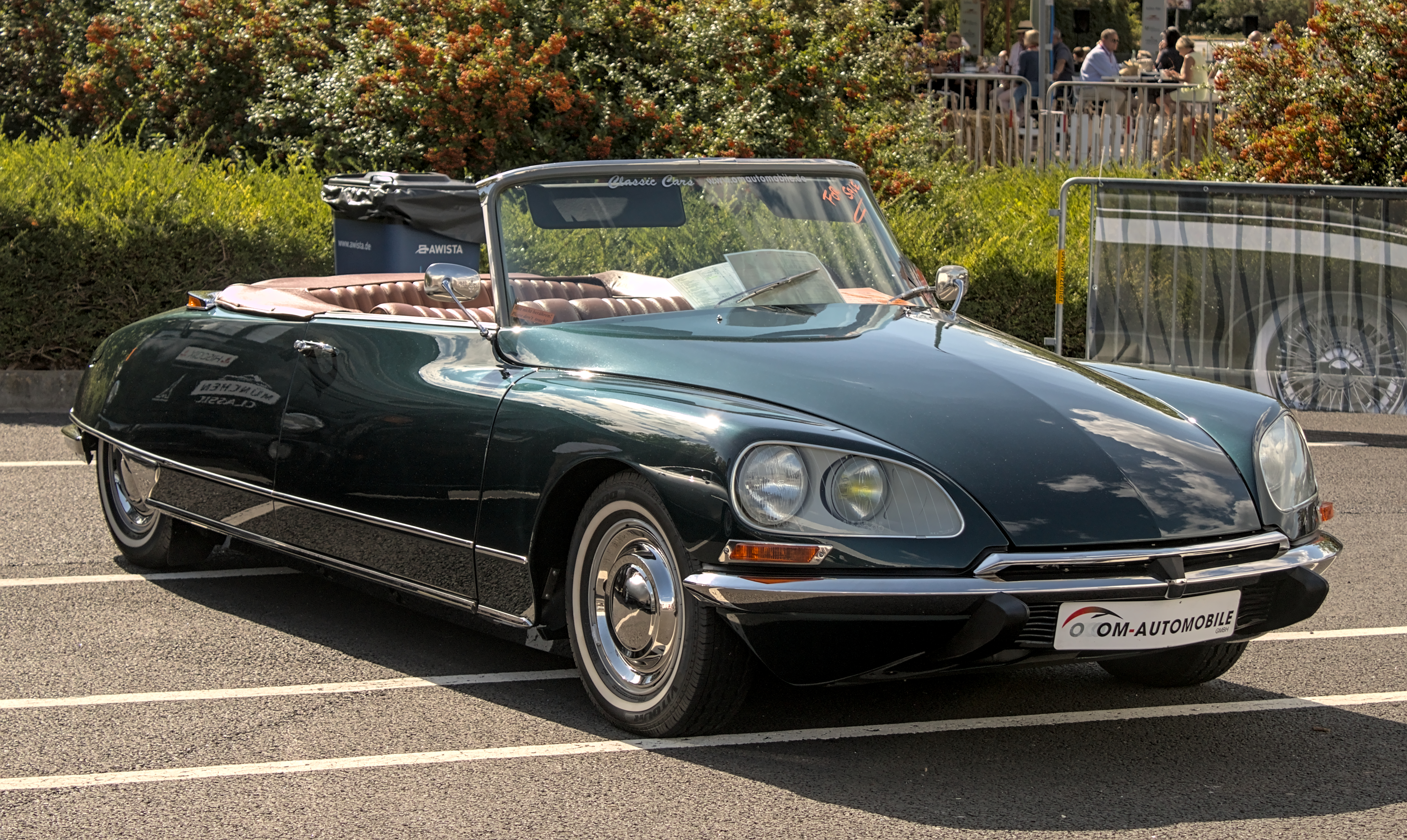
Citroën DS Convertible "usine" (factory)

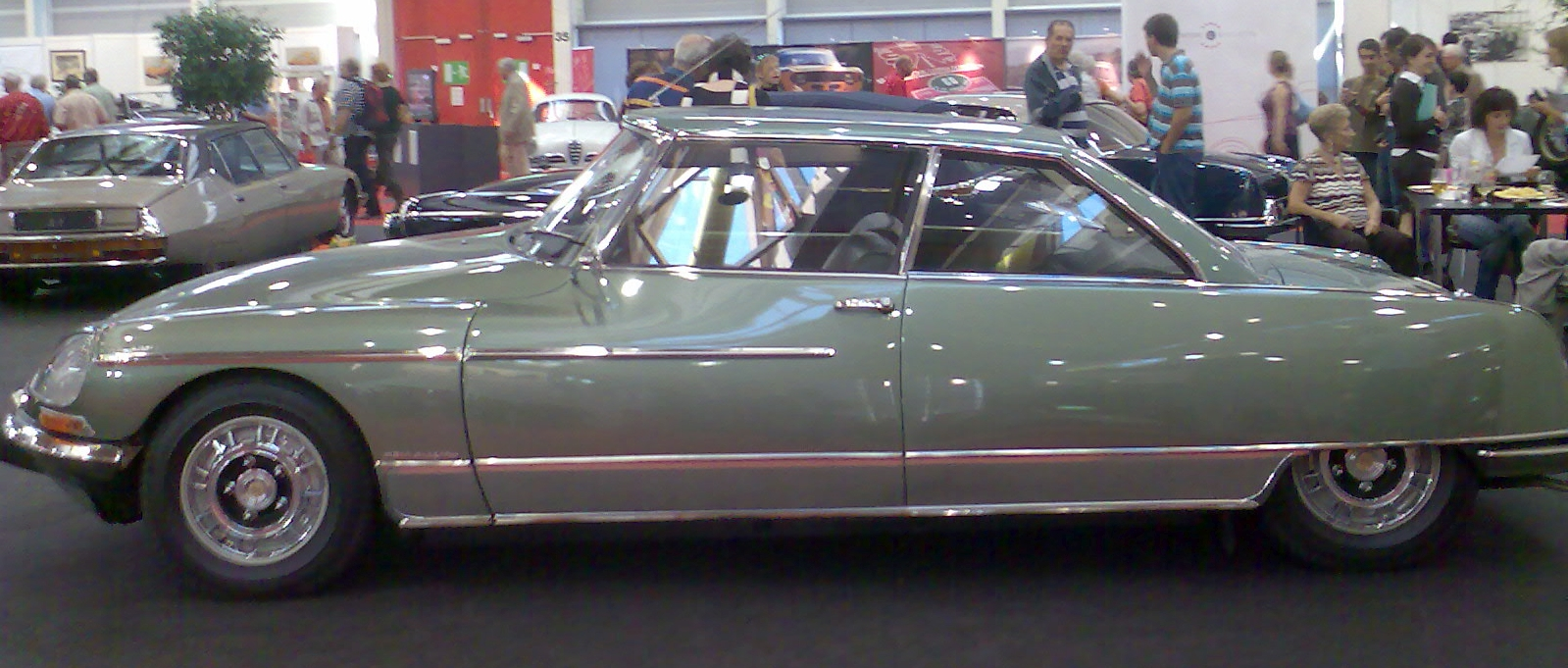
1971 Citroën Le Leman

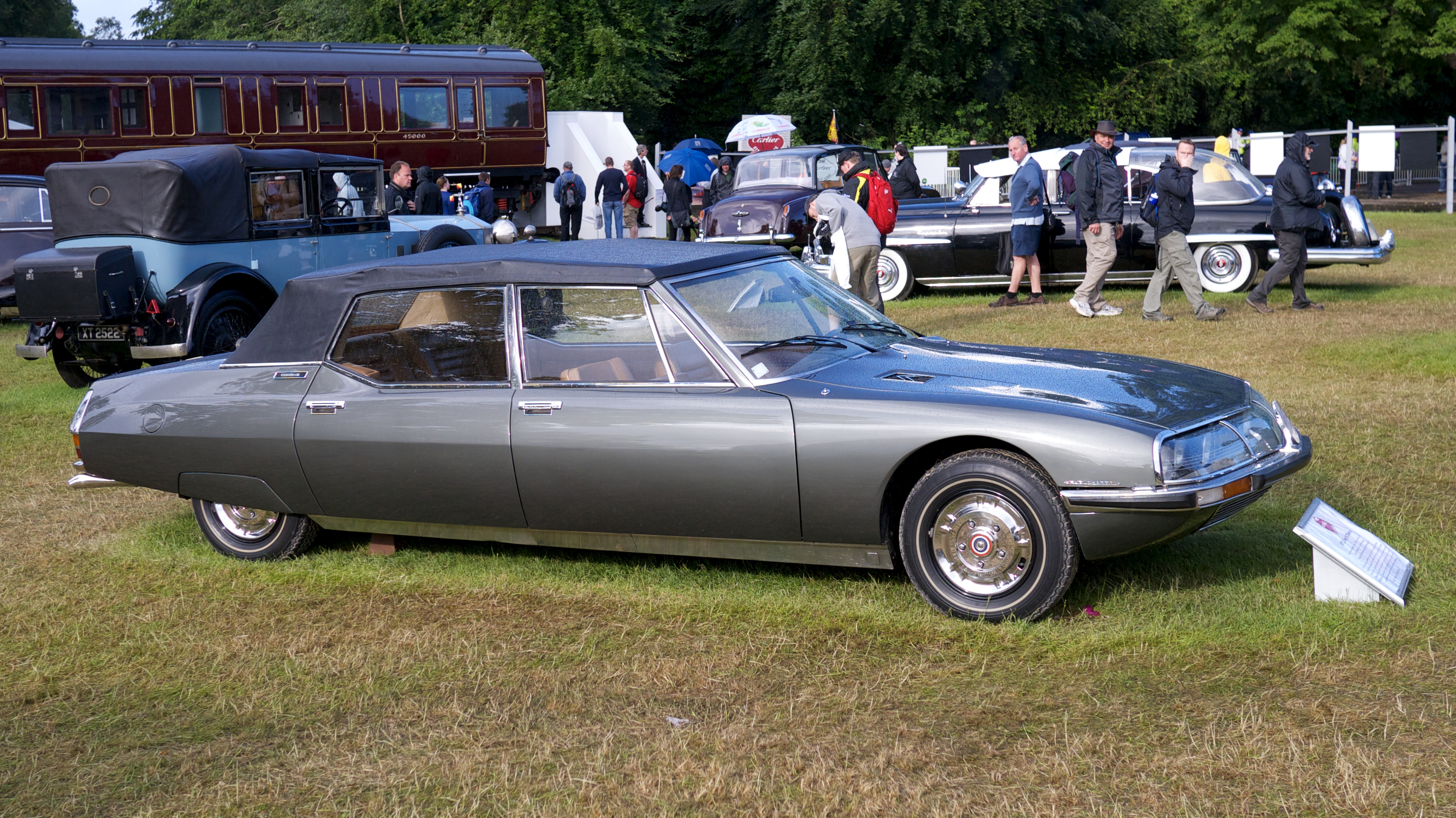
1972 SM Presidential

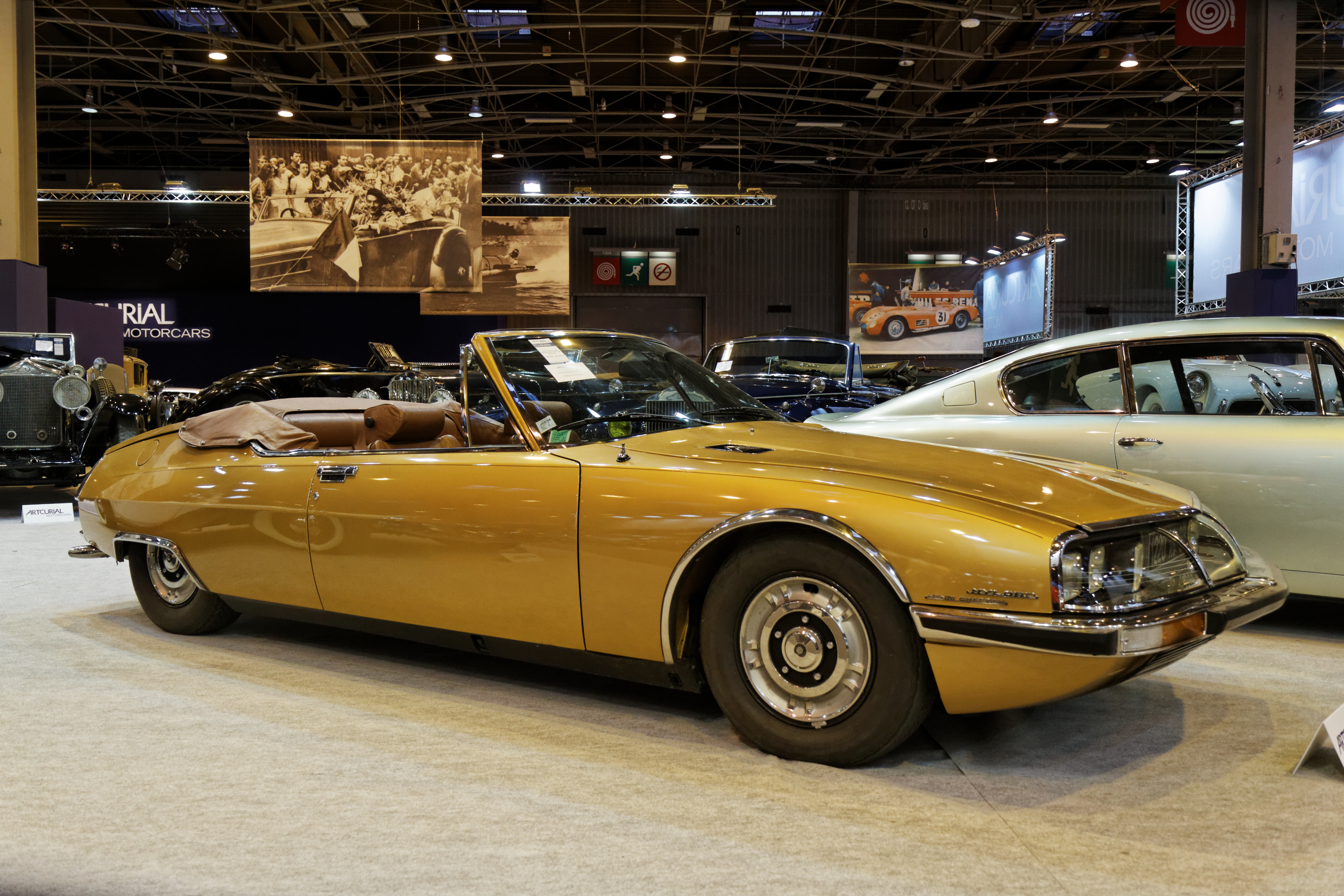
1975 Citroën SM Mylord, sold at auction in 2014 for EUR 548,000

== See also ==
- Heuliez
