= S.C.A.P. =

1912–1929 French automotive manufacturer

Logo of SCAP used between 1912 and 1929.

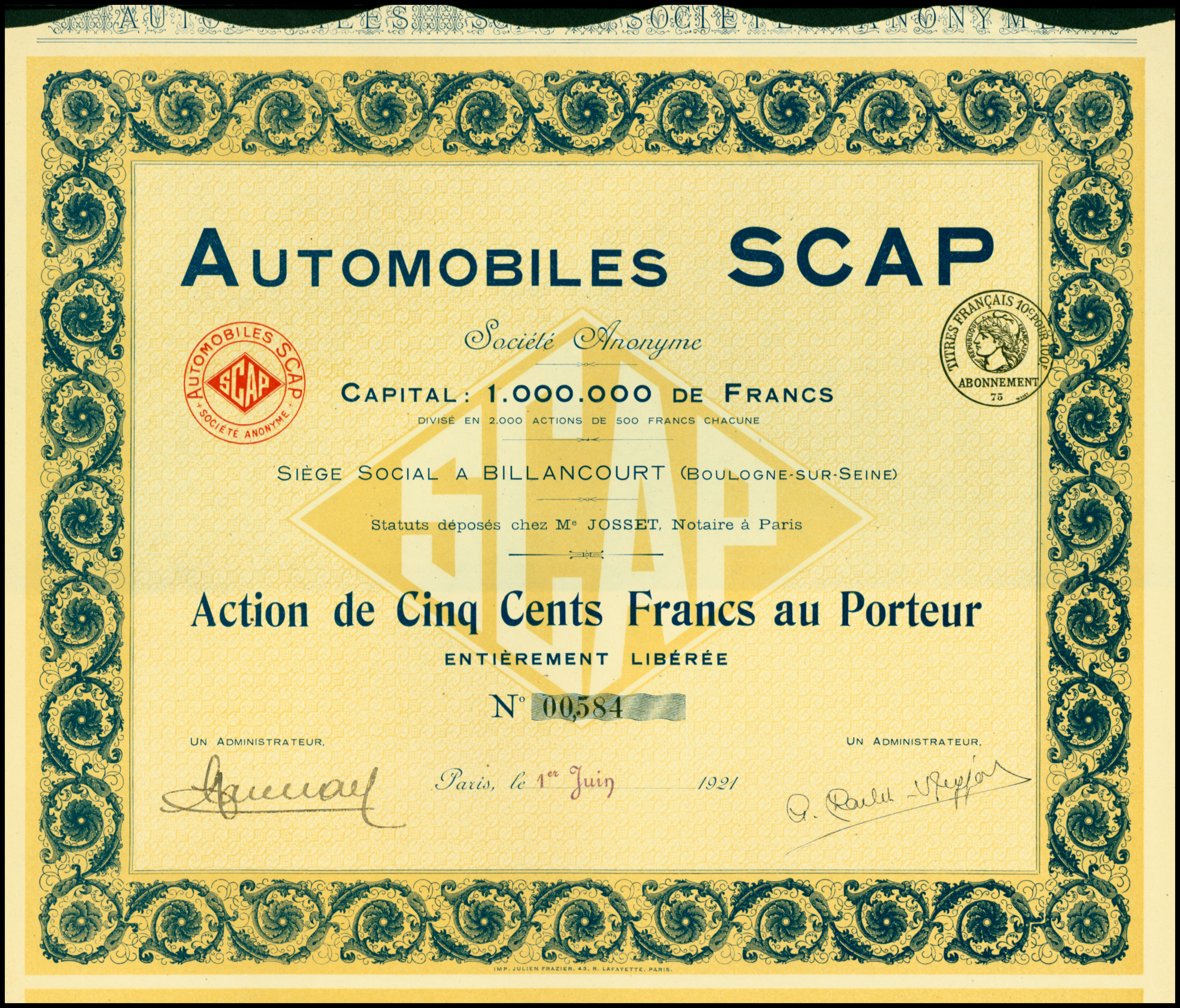
Share certificate for Automobiles SCAP SA, issued 1 June 1921

S.C.A.P. (Société de Construction Automobile Parisienne) was a French manufacturer of cars and proprietary engines, existing between 1912 and 1929.

== Products ==
S.C.A.P mainly manufactured small four-cylinder engines, with capacities from 894 cc to 3 litres. The factory also produced automobiles, particularly two-seater racing cars. The racing models were powered by a 1,100 cc engine with overhead valves, and was equipped with a Cozette compressor if the customer requested.

The larger models had either a 1,616 cc or a 1,704 cc, four-cylinder engine. In 1929, S.C.A.P unveiled a 2-litre, eight-cylinder engine, with overhead valves, but that model was the last made by S.C.A.P. Later on in the year, the company was adversely affected by the onset of the Great Depression and was forced to close its factory for good in late 1929.

== Customers ==
S.C.A.P. engines were offered in Rally cyclecars from 1922 until circa 1927.

S.C.A.P. engines were offered in Bucciali cyclecars from 1925.

== See also ==
- Cyclecar
- List of car brands
