= Delahaye 171 =

Overview
- Manufacturer: Delahaye
- Production: 1949–1953

Body and chassis
- Class: “pick-up” style Light Truck with derivatives
- Body style: Light truck “normal” Light truck “wide” 9-seater “familiale” ”break” & various derivatives
- Layout: Front engine, four-wheel drive

Powertrain
- Transmission: 4-speed manual with synchromesh on upper 3 ratios

Dimensions
- Wheelbase: 3,200 mm (130 in)
- Length: 5,220 mm (206 in) ”break” 5,150 mm (203 in)”pick-up”
- Width: 1,930 mm (76 in)
- Height: 2,300 mm (91 in)
- Curb weight: 1,930 kg (4,250 lb)”pick-up”

The Delahaye 171 was a “colonial” style vehicle developed by Delahaye for use in French Equatorial Africa and French West Africa. 1,082 units were built in its production run, which came to an end in 1953 or 1954. Sources differ.

The thinking behind the car was similar to that of Renault chairman Pierre Lefaucheux at this time: the 171 was intended to satisfy similar marketplace objectives to those addressed by the Renault Colorale.

It first appeared formally at the Paris Motor Show in 1949, but sales started only in 1950 of two different “Pick-up” versions, designed to take a ton of load. The “Pick-up Normal” version, with an advertised starting price of 991,500 Francs, had its load area behind the vehicle's cabin but between the two rear wheels, giving a load area that was unencumbered by wheel arches but relatively narrow. With the “Pick-up Large” version the load area extended to the full width of the cabin, but with the intrusion of the wheel arches. The bodywork of the load area did not extend beyond the cabin width on either version.

Staying true to its Delahaye roots, the 171 gained greatly in credibility with its target market by competing with distinction in the 14,394 km (8,944 mi) Mediterranean-Cape Town Rally that was run along the length of Africa between 31 December 1950 and 21 February 1951. The cars were run by a team from the French Army.

The “Break” (station wagon) version of the 171 was also offered, from 1952, as a nine-seater “familiale” which makes this one of several vehicles that could claim to have inspired the SUVs that became mainstream only in the 1990s. Even in this form the vehicle had only two doors, but with a width of 1930 mm (more than six feet) access was not a problem since on the passenger side the front bench seat did not extend to the full cabin width, so it was possible to access the middle two seats without much difficulty and possible to access the rear bench seat by passing between the two single seats of the middle row. The “Break” bodied cars had their bodies built by a car body firm called “Carrosserie de Levallois” which appears to have been one of a number of such firms concentrated in the car making a quarter of Paris.

The most prominently promoted of the other special bodied versions was a strikingly robust looking ambulance. Herwaythorn S.A., the French distributor of Hercules, Wayne, and Thornton products, also offered a 4x4 conversion.

The six-cylinder 3,557 cc water-cooled engine was shared with the company's prestigious 135 and 235 models. However, on the 171 the engine came with only one carburetor and a compression ratio of 6.9 : 1 (or for some situations 6.5 : 1) which was significantly lower than that of the luxury cars. The 171's claimed maximum power output of 80 hp or 100 hp at 3,500 rpm was correspondingly lower than the 152 hp at 4,200 rpm listed for the 235.

Large tires and 280 mm (11 inches) of ground clearance hinted at the variable road quality in some of the vehicle's target markets.

The company's bread and butter model during its final years was the Jeep-inspired VLR which gained a large contract with the French army. The sales of the colonial 171 were far lower than those of the VLR but nevertheless very much higher than those achieved by the company's famous luxury cars, and by 1952 the 171 was being produced at a rate of approximately 30 per month, sold in the French colonies and also achieving significant export success, especially in Brazil. Unfortunately, the 171 never sold in sufficient numbers to compensate for the commercial failure visited on the company's luxury car sales by post-war austerity and government taxation policy, and once the army contract for the VLR’s was lost the company quickly fell into the arms of Hotchkiss, the sale protocol being signed by the Delahaye shareholders on 9 June 1954. By this time Delahaye 171 sales had slowed to a trickle, with just 28 of them delivered during 1954, at the end of which production of the 171 was stopped.
