= Delahaye =

Defunct French manufacturing company

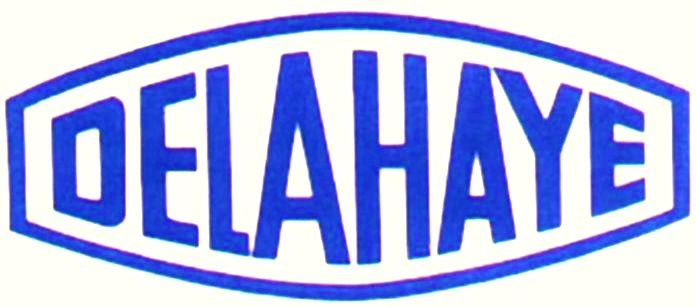

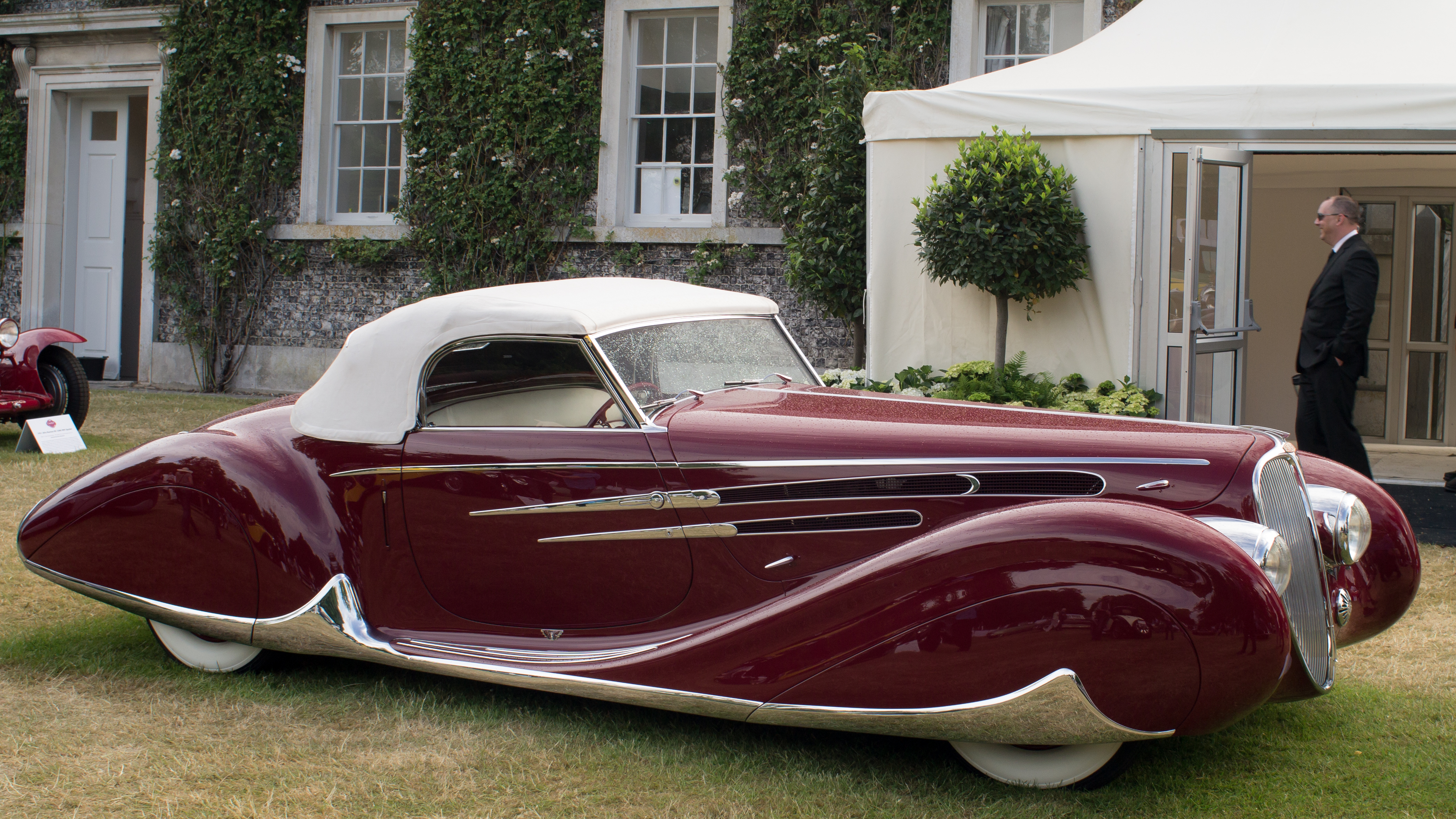
- Delahaye 165
- Industry: Manufacturing
- Founded: 1894 in Tours, France
- Founder: Émile Delahaye
- Defunct: 1954
- Headquarters: Paris, France
- Products: Cars, trucks, utility vehicles and busses

Delahaye was a family-owned automobile manufacturing company, founded by Émile Delahaye in 1894 in Tours, France. Manufacturing was moved to Paris following incorporation in 1898 with two marriage-related brothers-in-law, George Morane and Leon Desmarais, as Emile Delahaye's equal partners. The company built a low volume line of limited production luxury cars with coachbuilt bodies; trucks; utility and commercial vehicles; buses; and fire-trucks. Delahaye made a number of technical innovations, particularly in its early years. After establishing a racing department in 1932, the company came to prominence in France in the mid-to-late 1930s, first with the International record-breaking Type 138; then, the Type 135 that famously evolved into the special short-wheelbase sports-racing Type 135CS; followed by the V12 types 145 and 155 racecars. Many races were won, and records set. The company faced setbacks due to the Second World War, and was taken over by amalgamation with arch competitor Hotchkiss in 1954. Both were absorbed by the large Brandt manufacturing organization, within months, with automotive products ended. Delahaye closed forever at the end of 1954, taking Delage along with it.

== History ==
=== Formative years ===
Engineer Émile Delahaye began experimenting with belt-driven cars in 1894, while he was manager of the Brethon Foundry and Machine-works in Tours, France. These experiments encouraged him to acquire the foundry and machine-works, so that Monsieur Brethon could retire. Emile soon entered his automobiles in the 1896 Paris–Marseille–Paris race, and the 1897 Paris–Dieppe race, followed in 1898 by the Marseilles–Nice rally, the Course de Périgeux, and the Paris–Amsterdam–Paris race.

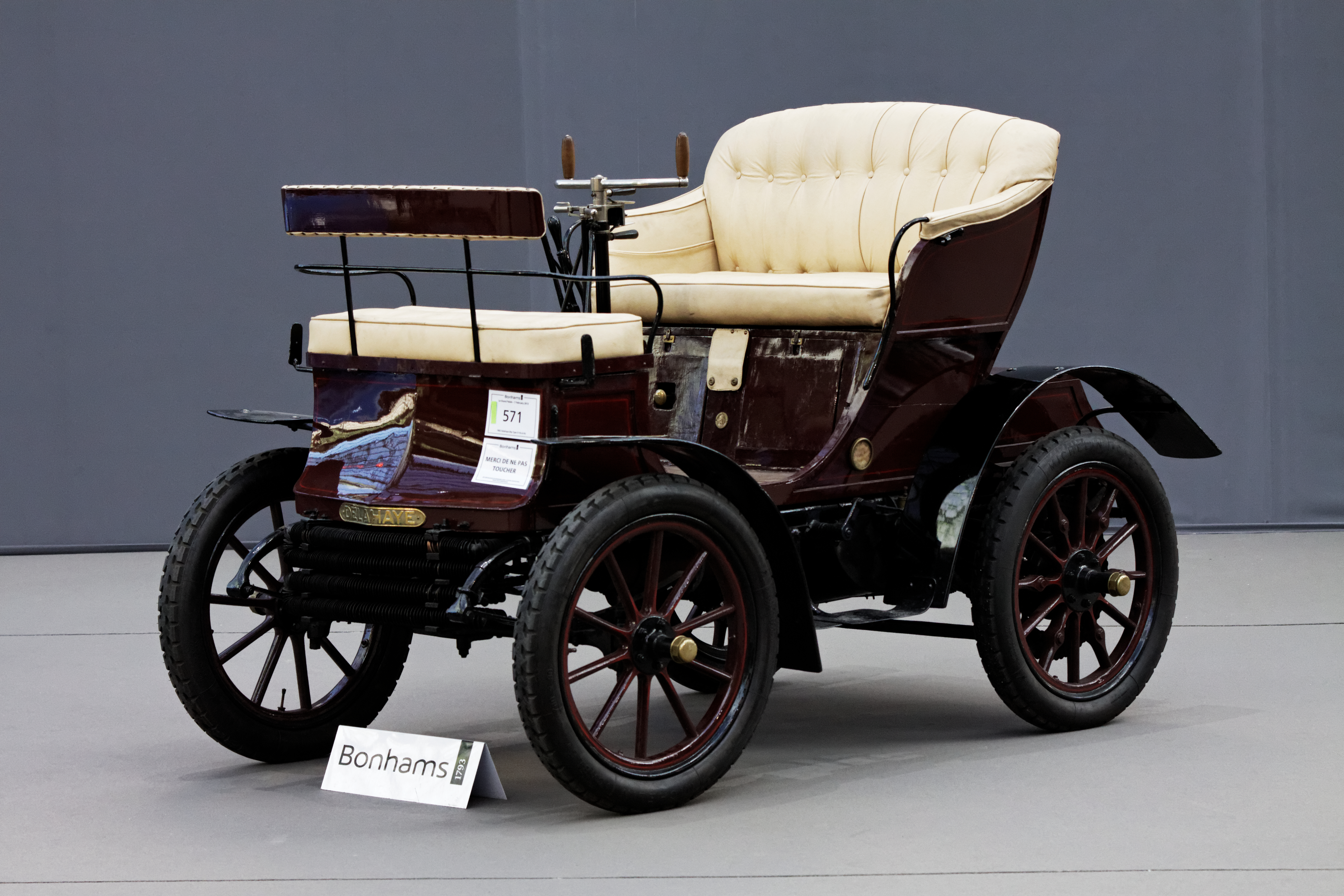
Delahaye Type 0, manufactured 1902

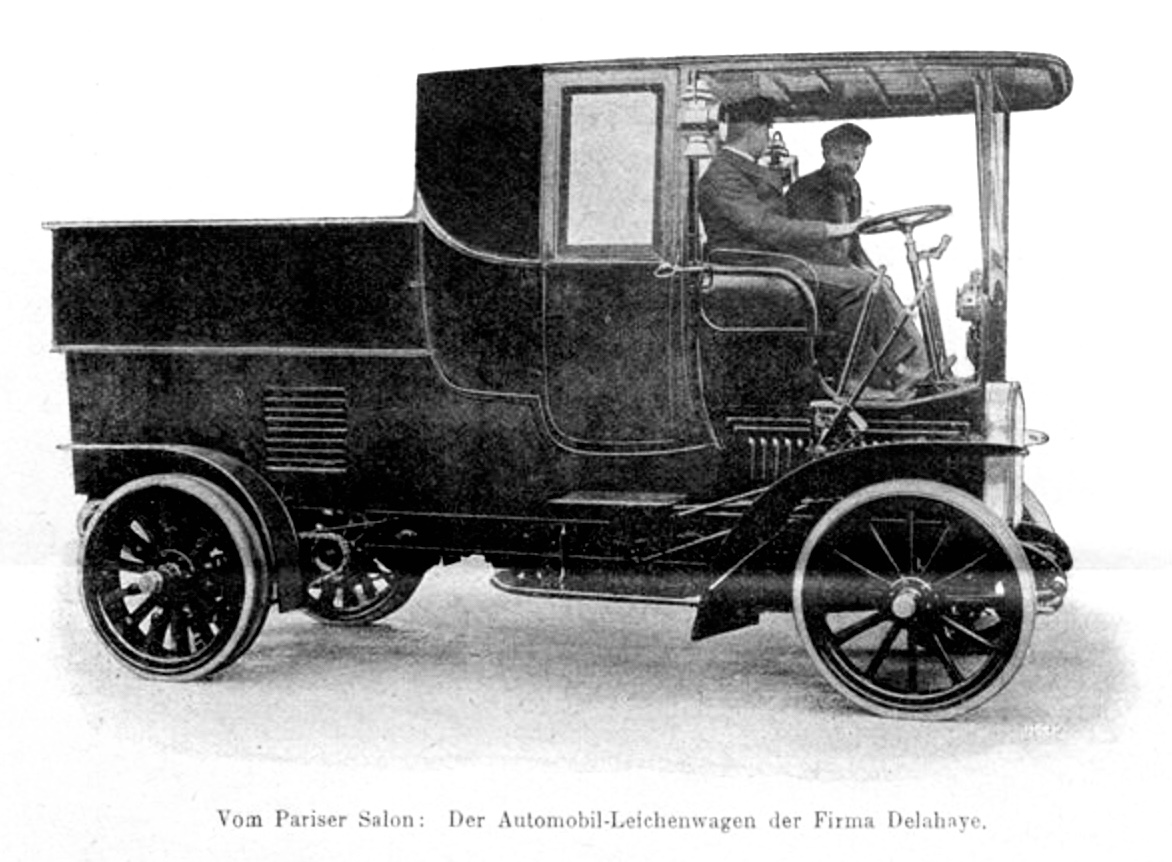
A 1906 Delahaye hearse

Delahaye's automotive company was incorporated in 1898 with investors George Morane – who had driven one of Delahaye's cars in the Marseilles–Nice rally – and Morane's brother-in-law Leon Desmarais. The company moved its manufacturing from Tours to Paris, to a former hydraulic machinery plant owned by the Morane family. Charles Weiffenbach was made operations manager. The company initially produced three models at this location: the 1.4 litre single-cylinder Type 0, and the twin-cylinder Type 1 and Type 2. All three had bicycle-style tiller steering, rear-mounted water-cooled engines, automatic valves, surface carburetors, and trembler coil ignition; drive was a combination of belt and chain, with three forward speeds and one reverse.

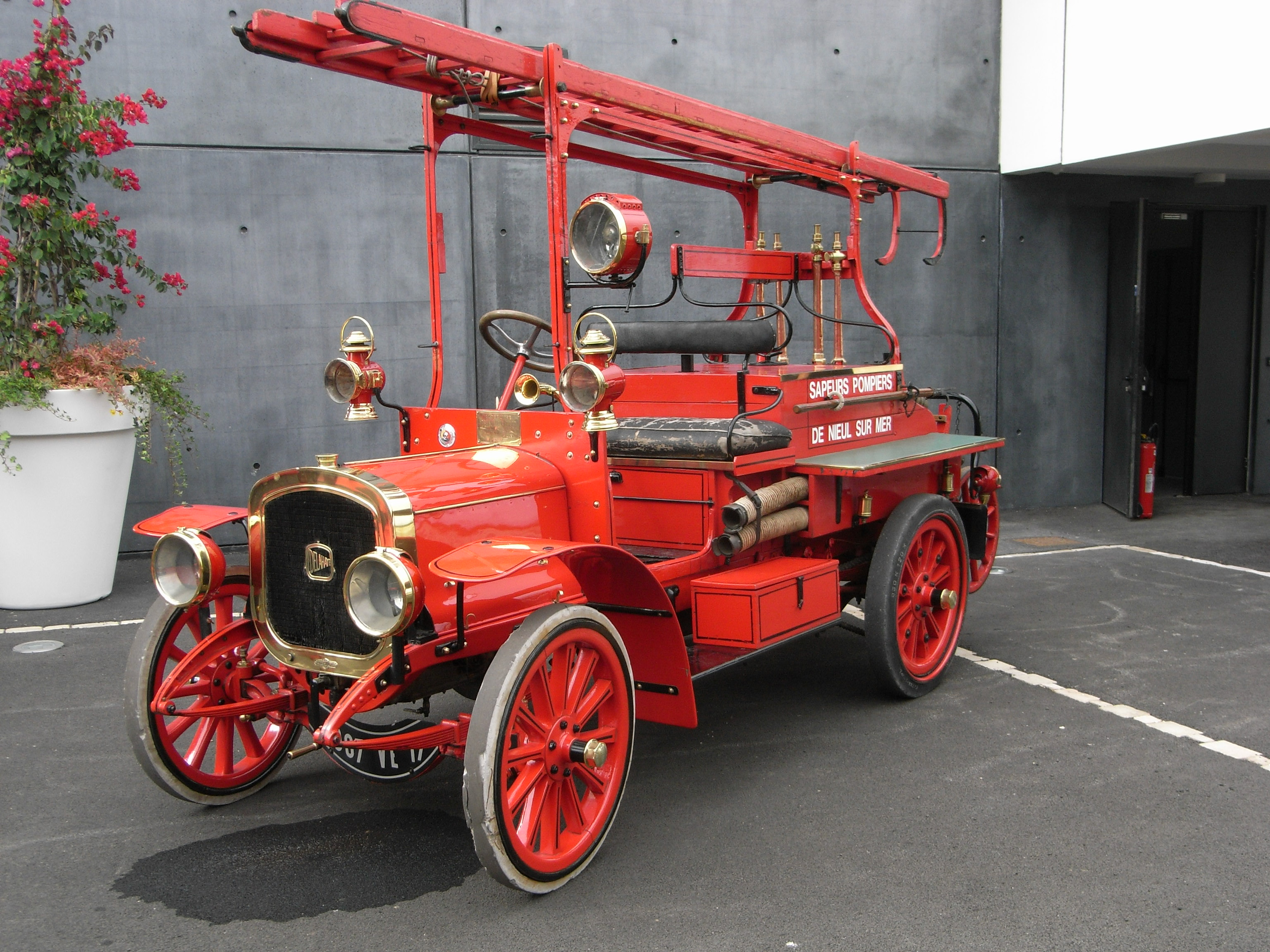
Delahaye-Farcot type 32 pumper

Desmarais and Morane took control of the company when Émile Delahaye retired in 1901; Weiffenbach took over from them in 1906. The company ceased its participation in racing after Delahaye's death in 1905. Weiffenbach had no interest in racing, and focused on production of practical motorized automotive chassis, heavy commercial vehicles, and early firetrucks for the French government.

By 1904, about 850 automobiles had been built. The company introduced its first production four-cylinder in 1903 and shaft-drive transmissions in 1907. Delahaye's chief design-engineer Amédée Varlet invented and pioneered the V6 engine in the 1911 Type 44. Varlet also designed the Delahaye Titan marine engine, an enormous cast-iron multi-valve twin-cam four-cylinder engine that was fitted into purpose-built speedboat La Dubonnet, which briefly held the world speed record on water.

=== Licensing and collaborations ===
German manufacturer Protos began licensed production of Delahaye models in 1907, while in 1909, H. M. Hobson began importing Delahaye vehicles to Britain. US manufacturer White pirated the Delahaye design; the First World War interrupted efforts to recover damages. By the end of the war, Delahaye's major income was from manufacturing trucks.

Following the war, Delahaye attempted, in 1927, to increase profits by adopting a modest form of assembly-line production, in a tripartite agreement with FAR Tractor Company and Chenard & Walcker automakers, and Rosengart, an entry-level manufacturer of small family cars. However, the range of vehicles undertaken to produce was excessively extensive, too diverse, and totally devoid of practical standardization. The collaboration did not last long as shrinking sales volume threatened the company's survival. By 1931, the triumvirate had disintegrated. It has been alleged that Weiffenbach met with his friend and competitor Ettore Bugatti, to seek his opinion on turning Delahaye around. In 1932, Desmarais's widow and majority shareholder, Madame Leon Desmarais, instructed Weiffenbach to develop a new, higher quality, and considerably sportier automotive-chassis line, with an appealingly distinctive appearance, improved horsepower, better handling, and a higher price-point. Delahaye was repositioned to appeal to a wealthier, younger, more sporting oriented customer base. Varlet was instructed to establish both the new drawing office, and the racing department, neither of which Delahaye ever had before. Weiffenbach hired Jean François, as Varlet's assistant, and the company's designer and chief engineer. Delahaye had escaped near disaster, to arise with virtually immediate success, in the new Type 134, followed almost immediately by the International speed record setting Type 138, and then the model that made Delahaye deservedly famous: the Type 135.

=== Delahaye 102-102M (1926-1931) ===
At the same time, Delahaye developed in its sports lineup the Type 102 and Type 102M, produced in very limited series: 7 units of the 102 and 30 units of the 102M.

Both models shared the same four-cylinder engine block, with a bore of 82.5 mm and a stroke of 125 mm, giving an approximate displacement of 2,675 cm^{3} (2.675 liters). There were no differences in piston diameter between the 102 and 102M; the variations were mainly in the chassis evolution and some construction details. These models represented the brand's sports offering in the late 1920s, with a performance-oriented approach yet still relatively close to series production.

The Delahaye Type 102M had a limited but notable presence in hill climbs and sporting events between 1926 and 1929. Its main achievements include:

Laffrey Hill Climb (1927): Victory in the 3-litre Touring and 3-litre Sports categories.

Ballon d’Alsace Hill Climb (1927): Overall record in all 3-litre sports categories.

Mont Revard and Mont Ventoux (1928): Good general classifications, notable for mechanical reliability.

French regional competitions: Documented participations in the Rhône-Alpes and French Alps region.

Thanks to its limited production, short and light chassis, and competition successes, the Type 102M is today considered one of the most exclusive and valued Delahaye models among collectors and historic racing enthusiasts.

=== Delahaye 102 3L (special factory version) ===
Above the conventional 102 and 102M models existed an exceptional variant: the 102 3L, which should be clearly distinguished from the standard 102 and 102M, as only one unit is known, making it a kind of competition prototype. Its chassis was short, with a wheelbase of 3.115 m, and it featured a front axle with ventilated brakes, Perrot-Adex licensed.

This version was modified directly by the factory with a clearly competitive orientation. The engine was based on the original 102 block, but the stroke was increased to 140 mm while keeping the bore at 82.5 mm, giving a total displacement of 2,991 cm^{3} (3 liters) for superior performance in competition. This was a specific factory-engineered mechanical evolution, not a private tuning.

The lubrication system used an advanced centrifugal oil pressure solution through a front plate integrated in the crankshaft, with a passage accelerating oil pressure thanks to rotation. Cooling was provided via a double radiator: the rear core was the original Delahaye unit, and the front was corrugated. The intake pipe measured 41 mm, in line with its sporty configuration. The steering box was numbered 102 and directly articulated through perforated mounts. The gearbox was 4-speed plus reverse, with a short throw, different from that used on other contemporary models of the brand.

The 102 3L was conceived as a technical response to compete against 3-litre European sports cars that dominated hill climbs, endurance events, and rallies in the late 1920s, including cars such as the Bentley 3 Litre, Hispano-Suiza 3 Litre, Sunbeam 3 Litre, or Delage 3 Litre. It can be considered the brand's true competitive test and the seed of Delahaye's future involvement in motorsport.

Its original bodywork is not known with certainty, although given its design and period, it was likely a torpedo or boattail, common solutions on sports cars intended for competition at the time.

As only one factory-modified 3L unit is known and no additional production in this specification is recorded, the 102 3L would today be a true one-off in Delahaye's history: a unique piece representing the brand's first real step into high-level competition and one of the rarest and most significant variants of its late-1920s sports production.

=== Return to racing ===
In 1934, Delahaye set eighteen class records at Montlhéry, in a specially prepared, stripped and streamlined 18 Sport. The company also introduced the 134N, a 12cv car with a 2.15-litre four-cylinder engine, and the 18cv Type 138, powered by a 3.2-litre six-cylinder engine – both developed from their successful truck engines. In 1935, success in the Alpine Trial led to the introduction of the sporting Type 135 "Coupe des Alpes". By the end of 1935, Delahaye had won eighteen minor French sports car events and a number of hill-climbs, and came fifth at Le Mans. In 1936, Delahaye ran four 160 hp (120 kW; 160 PS) cars (based on the Type 135) in the Ulster TT, placing second to Bugatti, and entered four at the Belgian 24 Hours, finishing 2-3-4-5 behind an Alfa Romeo. Delahaye was able to leverage their racing success to acquire automaker Delage in 1935.

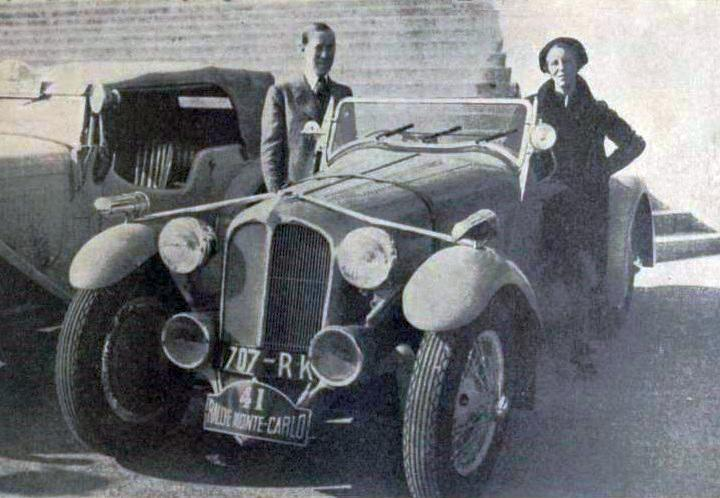
Laury and Lucy Schell took second place at the 1936 Monte Carlo Rally with a Delahaye 18CV Sport.

American heiress Lucy O'Reilly Schell paid the developmental costs for short "Competition Court" 2.70-metre-wheelbase Type 135 cars for rallying and racing. She purchased 12 of these, reserving half for her Ecurie Bleue amateur racing team.

In 1937, René Le Bègue and Julio Quinlin won the Monte Carlo Rally driving a Delahaye. Delahaye also ran first and second at Le Mans. Against the German government-sponsored juggernauts Mercedes-Benz and Auto Union, Delahaye entered the Type 145, powered by a complicated 4 1/2-litre V12. Called the "Million Franc Delahaye" after a victory in the Million Franc Race, the initial Type 145 was driven by René Dreyfus to an average speed 91.07 mph (146.56 km/h) over 200 km (120 mi) at Montlhéry in 1937, earning a 200,000 French francs government prize. Dreyfus also scored a victory in the Ecurie Bleu Type 145 at Pau in 1938, using the model's fuel economy to beat the more powerful Mercedes-Benz W154. Another Type 145 finished third in the same race.

These victories combined with French patriotism ensured demand for Delahaye cars up until the German occupation of France during World War II. In early 1940, 100 Type 134N and Type 168 chassis were built and bodied by Renault as military cars under contract for the French army. The French government had ordered all private automobile production to cease in June 1939, but small numbers of cars continued to be built for the occupying German forces until at least 1942.

In 1951, a French military team with Captain Monnier and Colonel Henri Debrus were part of the victorious crew that won the first Algiers-Cape Town Rally with a Delahaye pick-up.

=== Post-war decline ===
After World War II, French luxury car makers struggled under the depressed economy. General Pons's five-year reconstruction program (the Pons Plan) allocated the majority of its vehicles for export, and installed an increasingly punitive tax regime aimed at luxurious non-essential products, including cars with engines larger than two litres (120 cu in). In 1947, 88% of Delahaye production was exported, primarily to French colonies in Asia and Africa. Delahaye's meagre production of 573 cars in 1948 (compared to 34,164 by market-leader Citroën), was unsustainably low.

The new face of the postwar Delahaye was styled in-house by industrial designer Philippe Charbonneaux. Production of the outdated pre-war Type 135 and 148L was resumed in 1946, to restart cash flow and because the Type 175 and its two longer-wheelbased versions were not ready for introduction. The Type 175 was very modern when it had been envisioned in 1938 but its production was delayed until 1948 due to the war, post-war shortages, and the death of its designer.

With a license agreement in place and no viable alternatives, Delahaye proceeded with production of the Type 175. However, suspension components underwent catastrophic failure, and Delahaye was obliged to buy back a number of its vehicles to avoid litigation. The risk of negative publicity was so great that the company kept no records of these events. The affair could not be effectively contained and resulted in disinterest among prospective buyers. The Type 175, 178 and 180 models were unable to generate enough sales to recover development and production costs. Their production was discontinued in mid-1951.

Until early 1951, continuing demand from the French army for the company's light reconnaissance vehicles (VLR) enabled the company to operate. Small but steady demand for the Type 163 trucks allowed the business to remain solvent.

A one-ton capacity light truck (later sharing its 3.5-litre six-cylinder overhead-valve engine with the company's Type 235 luxury cars) made its debut at the 1949 Paris Motor Show as the Type 171. During the next twelve months the Type 171 spawned several brake-bodied versions, including ambulance and 9-seater "familiale" variants. The vehicle was intended for use in France's African colonies, having large wheels and high ground clearance, and was also exported to Brazil. By 1952, thirty Type 171s were produced per month.

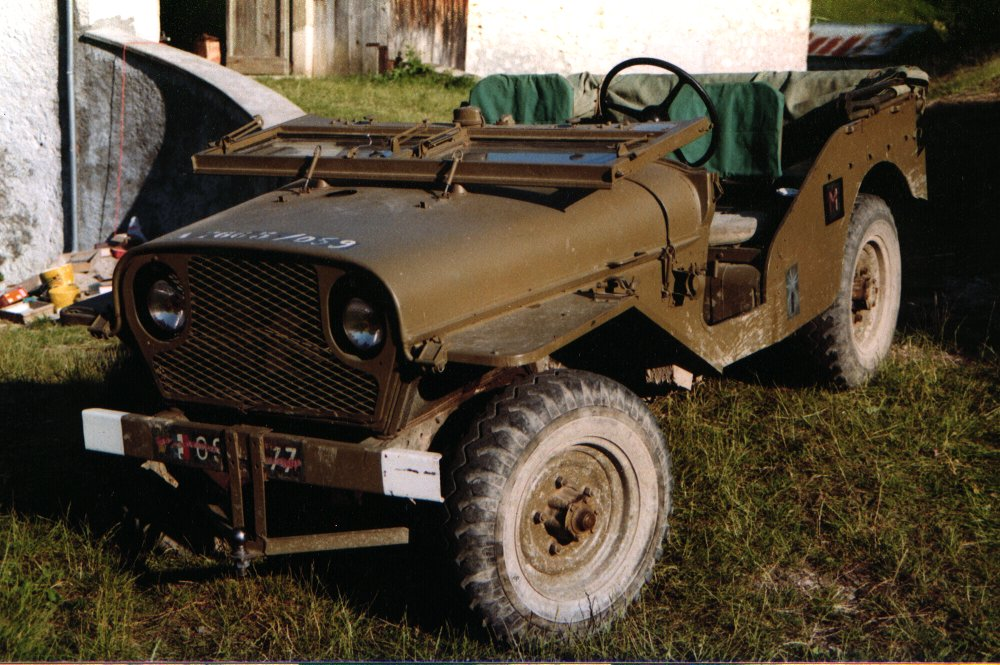
1950s French Army version VLR

Delahaye's last entirely new model, a 2-litre Jeep-like vehicle known as Delahaye VLR (Véhicule Léger de Reconnaissance Delahaye) was released in 1951. The French army believed that this vehicle offered a number of advantages over the traditional American-built Jeep of the period. During 1953, the company built 1,847 VLRs, as well as 537 "special" military vehicles. In that year no more than 36 Delahaye or Delage-branded passenger cars were registered.

In 1953, the Type 235 was introduced. Fernand Lecour, working with a small group of enthusiastic factory employees, convinced Weiffenbach to introduce an updated version of the Type 135, fitted with hydraulic instead of mechanical brakes, and a triple Solex carbureted version of the 3.6-litre Type 135 engine, which produced 152 hp (113 kW; 154 PS). This power was roughly equal to that of the previous series. Only 84 examples of the Type 235 were built.

Delahaye's competitor, Hotchkiss, negotiated a licensing agreement with Kaiser-Willys Motors, and obtained sanction to manufacture its Willys MB 'Jeep' in France. The French army began to appreciate the simpler machine, available at a much lower price, and cancelled the contract for the more sophisticated Delahaye VLR. In August 1953, the company laid off more than 200 employees. A merger was discussed with Hotchkiss, which was facing similar problems. On 19 March 1954, an agreement was signed by Delahaye president Pierre Peigney and Hotchkiss president Paul Richard. Less than three months later, on 9 June, Delahaye shareholders accepted a takeover of Delahaye by Hotchkiss, after which Hotchkiss promptly shut down Delahaye car production. By the end of 1954, after a brief period selling trucks with the Hotchkiss-Delahaye nameplate, the combined firm was itself taken over by Brandt. By 1956, the brands Delahaye, Delage, and Hotchkiss were no longer in use.

== Ownership and administration ==
From its incorporation, Delahaye remained a private, entirely family-owned company, until it closed its doors for the last time, on December 31, 1954.

Emile Delahaye, a successful Tours foundry and machine-works owner, built his first car in 1894. By 1898, the demand required that he expand facilities and obtain investment capital. Emile Delahaye agreed to partner equally with coppersmith business owners and brothers-in-law, Leon Desmarais and George Morane. The arrangement was duly incorporated in 1898, and car assembly was moved to the vacant Paris factory owned by the incoming partners. When Delahaye retired in 1901, from failing health, he sold his shares to his partners, with Desmarais purchasing more, thus gaining a majority. As the Desmarais and Morane families were connected by marriage, Delahaye was a family-owned business, from 1901 until its takeover by Hotchkiss in 1954. Delahaye was the minority partner. The board of directors was composed of the shareholders, plus their appointed manager of operations, Charles Weiffenbach, as chief executive officer.

Emile Delahaye had been the company's president, its sole engineer, and the administrator, until his retirement in 1901. In 1898, Delahaye hired Charles Weiffenbach as his managerial assistant; and, Amédée Varlet as the design-engineer. Both men were qualified mechanical engineers, with differing talents, and both stayed with the company for their entire working career. Weiffenbach became the operations manager in 1906, while Varlet focused on technical engineering and manufacturing advances. In 1932, 42-year-old Jean François was hired as chief design-engineer. Amadee Varlet was over eighty by then, and past his creative prime, but his earned respect caused him to be promoted to head up the new drawing office, and set up and manage the new racing department, assisted by much younger engineer Jean François.

Pierre Peigney, a family relative, was the president, but his was more a formal role, since it was Charles Weiffenbach who had been mandated by the partners to run the company, literally single-handedly.

This he did, including after orchestrating the merger in 1954 with Hotchkiss, a prime competitor. President Peigney signed for Delahaye, and president Richard signed for Hotchkiss. Neither company had the strength and resources to avoid being absorbed by the gigantic Brandt group of companies. Delahaye vanished into extinction in late 1954.

== Notable models ==
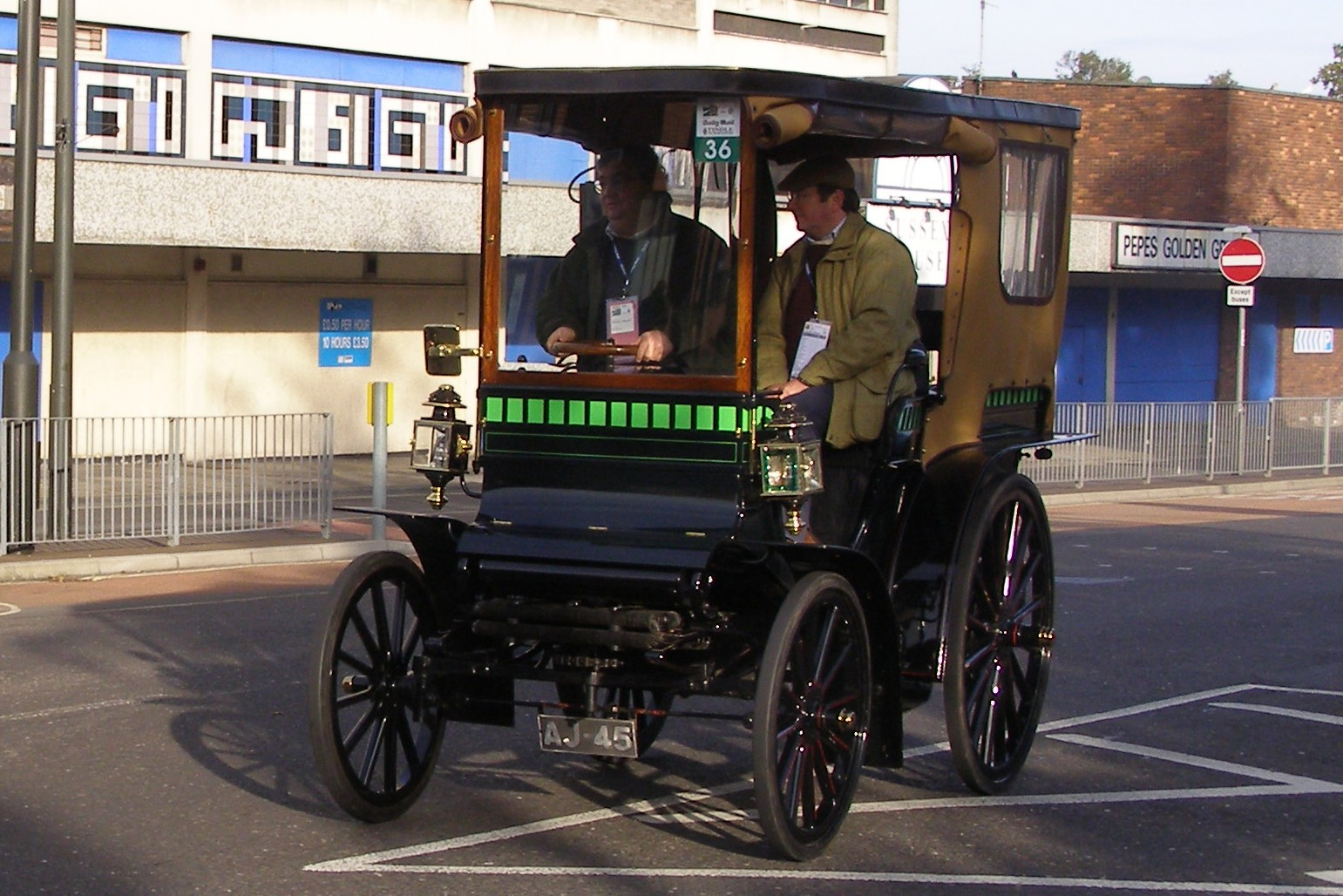
1899 built vehicle at 2006 rally

- Delahaye 1 – 1895–1901
- Delahaye 44 – 1911–1914 – first production V6
- Delahaye 134 – 1933–1940
- Delahaye 135 – 1935–1954
- Delahaye 138
- Delahaye 145 - 1937–1939
- Delahaye 148
- Delahaye 168 – 1938–1940
- Delahaye 175 – 1948–1951
- Delahaye 178
- Delahaye 180
- Delahaye 235 – 1951–1954
- Delahaye VLR – 1951–1954

== Gallery ==
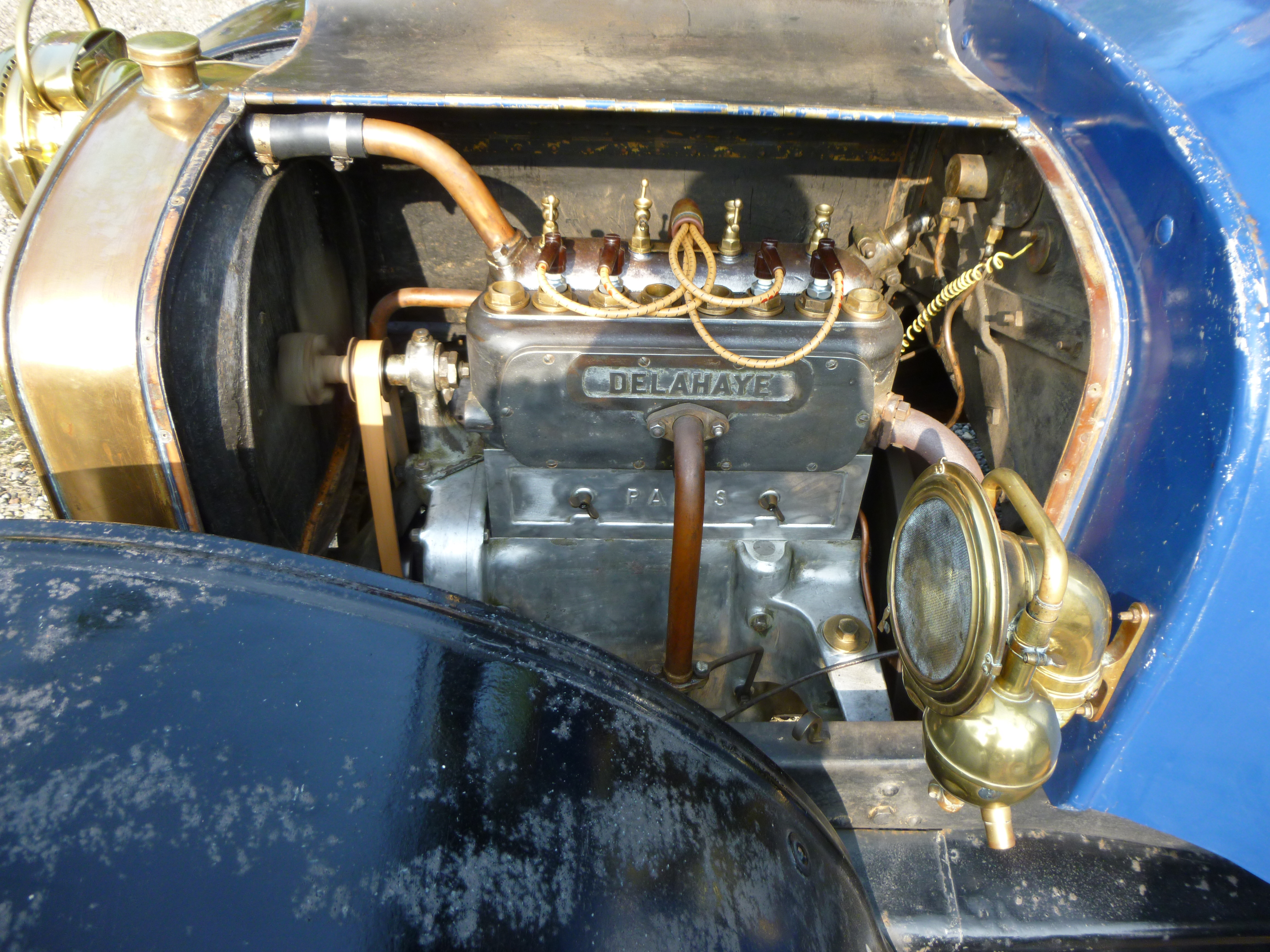
Engine Delahaye Type 32L Limousine 1912

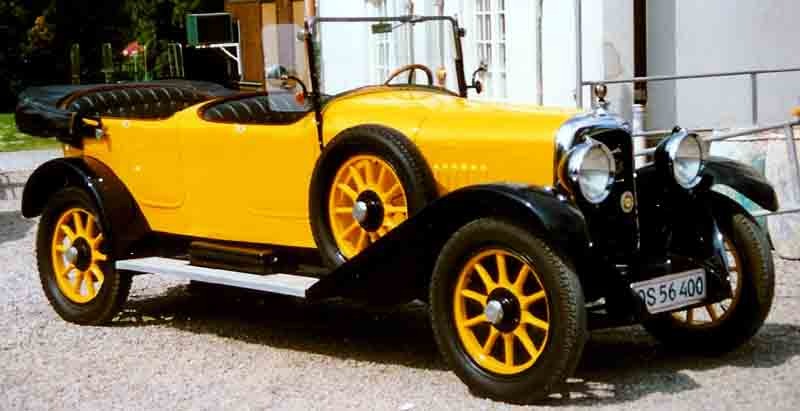
Delahaye Tourer (1925)

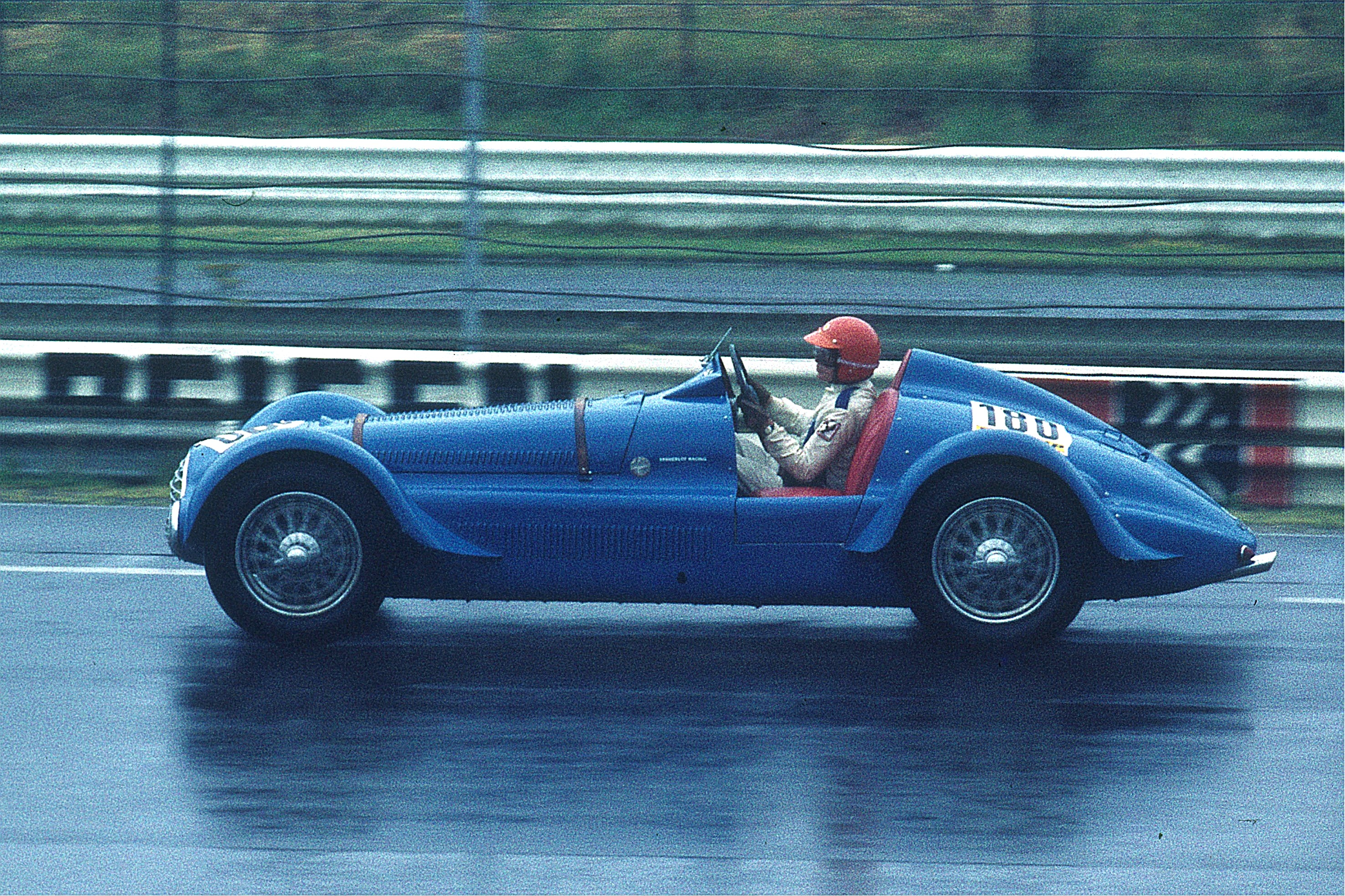
Delahaye 135 MS (1936)

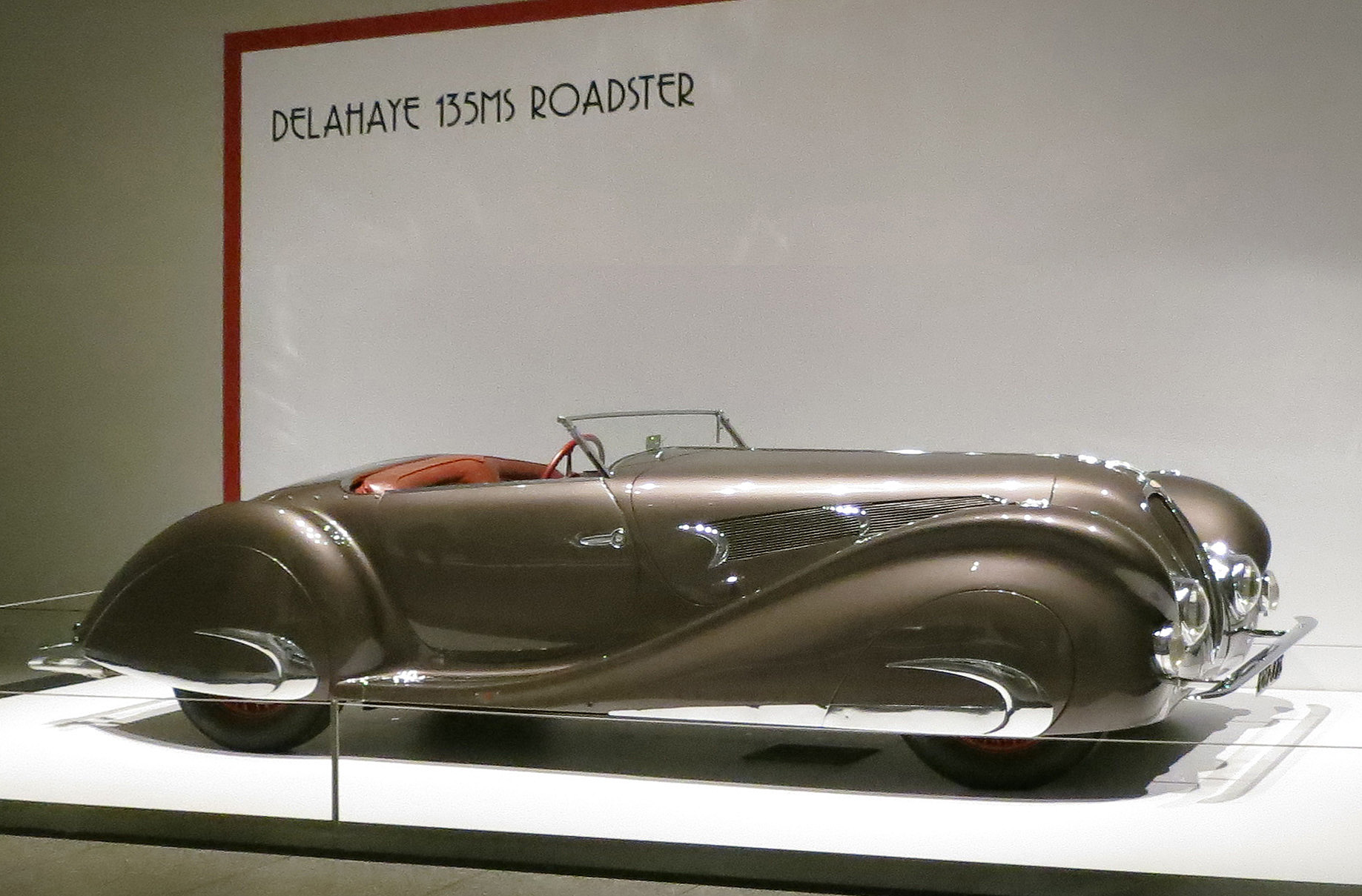
1937 Delahaye 135MS Roadster

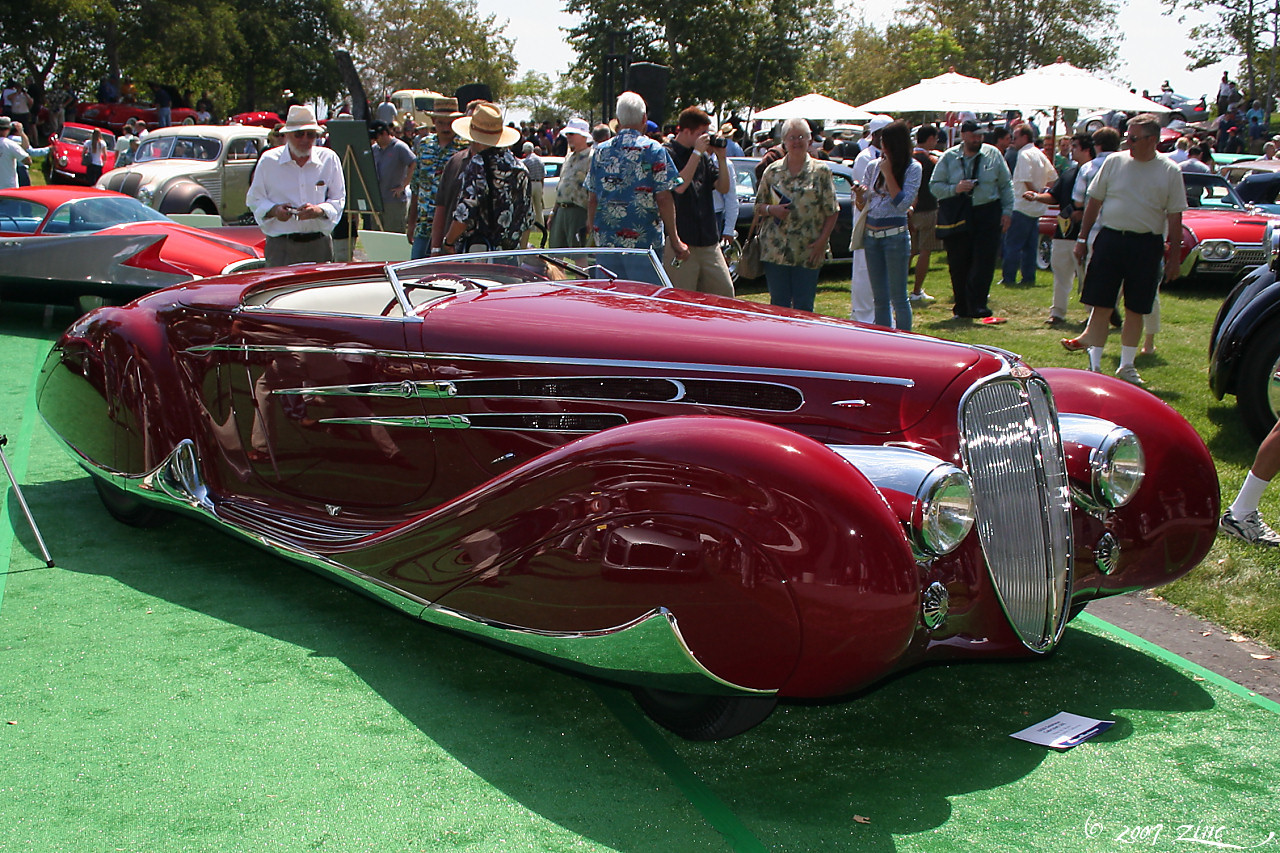
Delahaye 165 Figoni et Falaschi (1939)

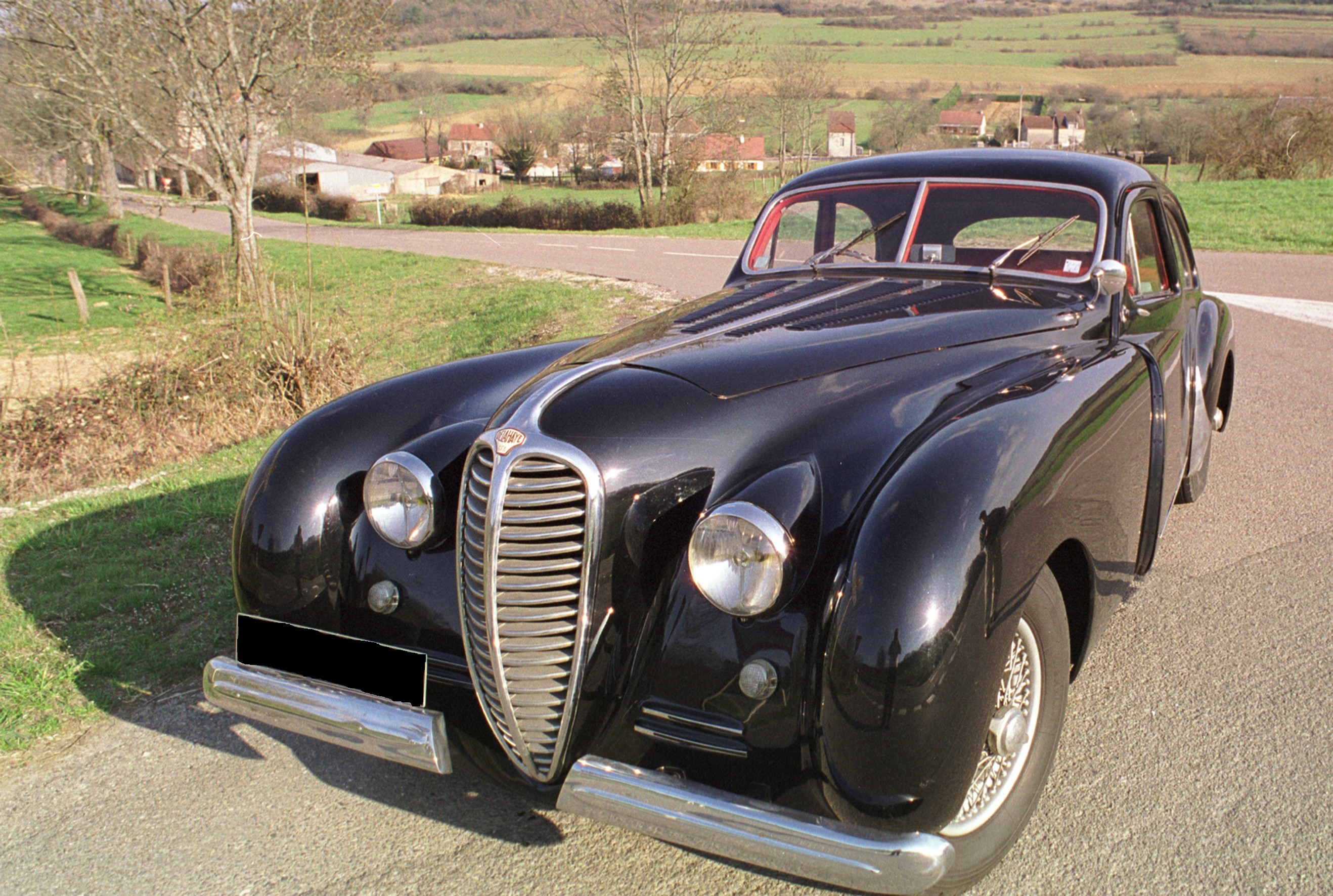
Delahaye 135 (1948)

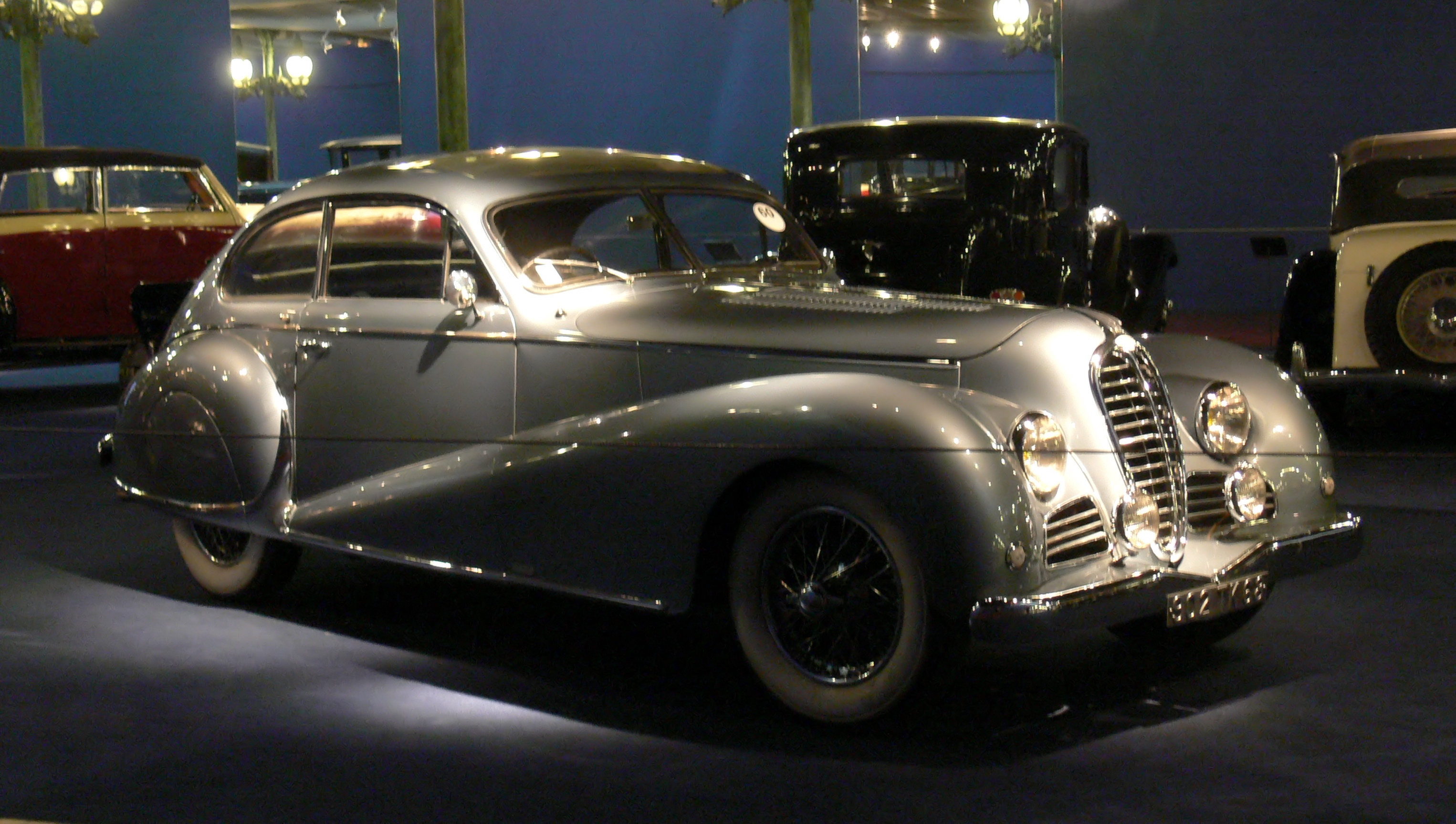
Delahaye 135M

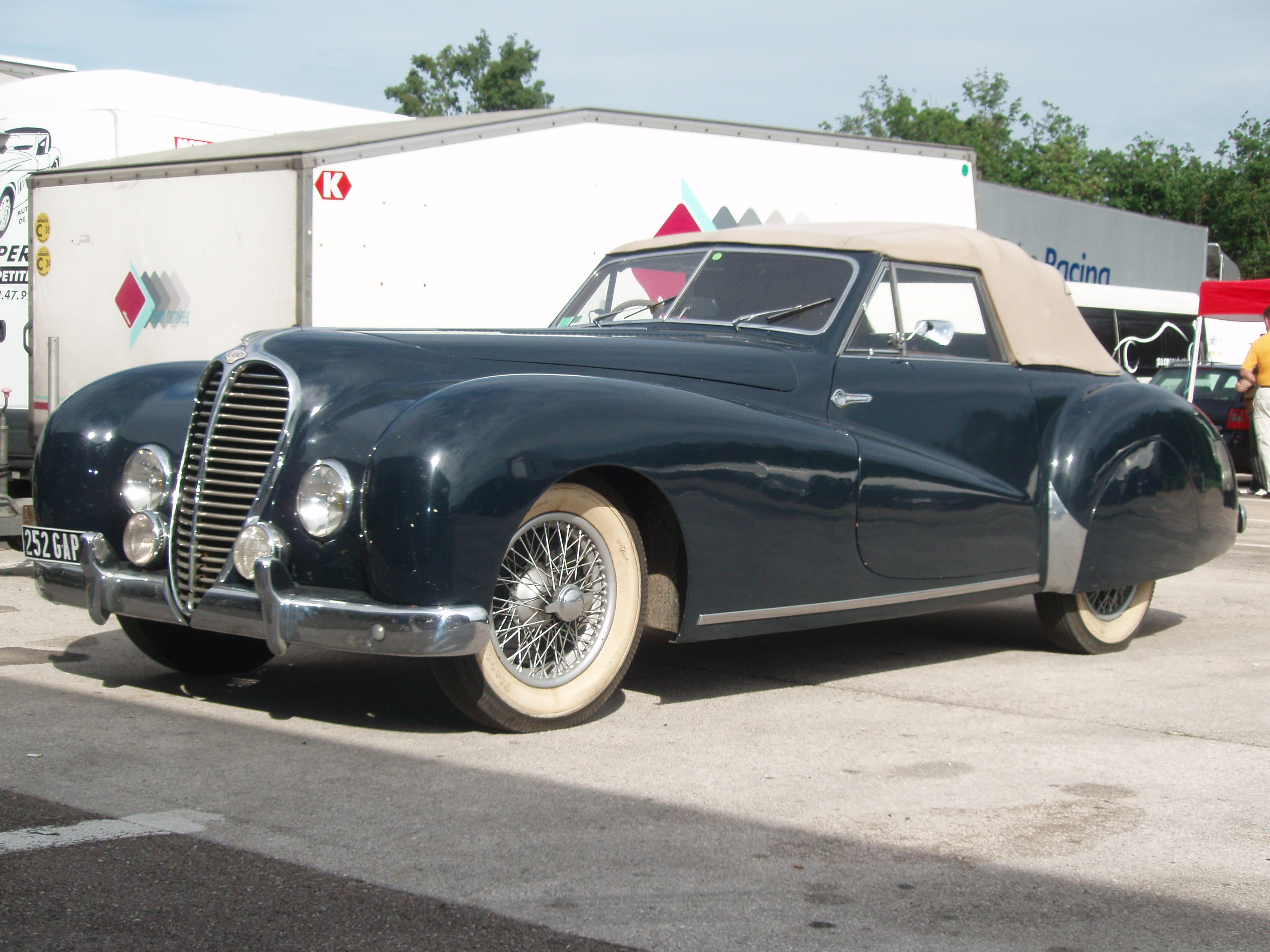
Delahaye 135MS Cabriolet Pourtout

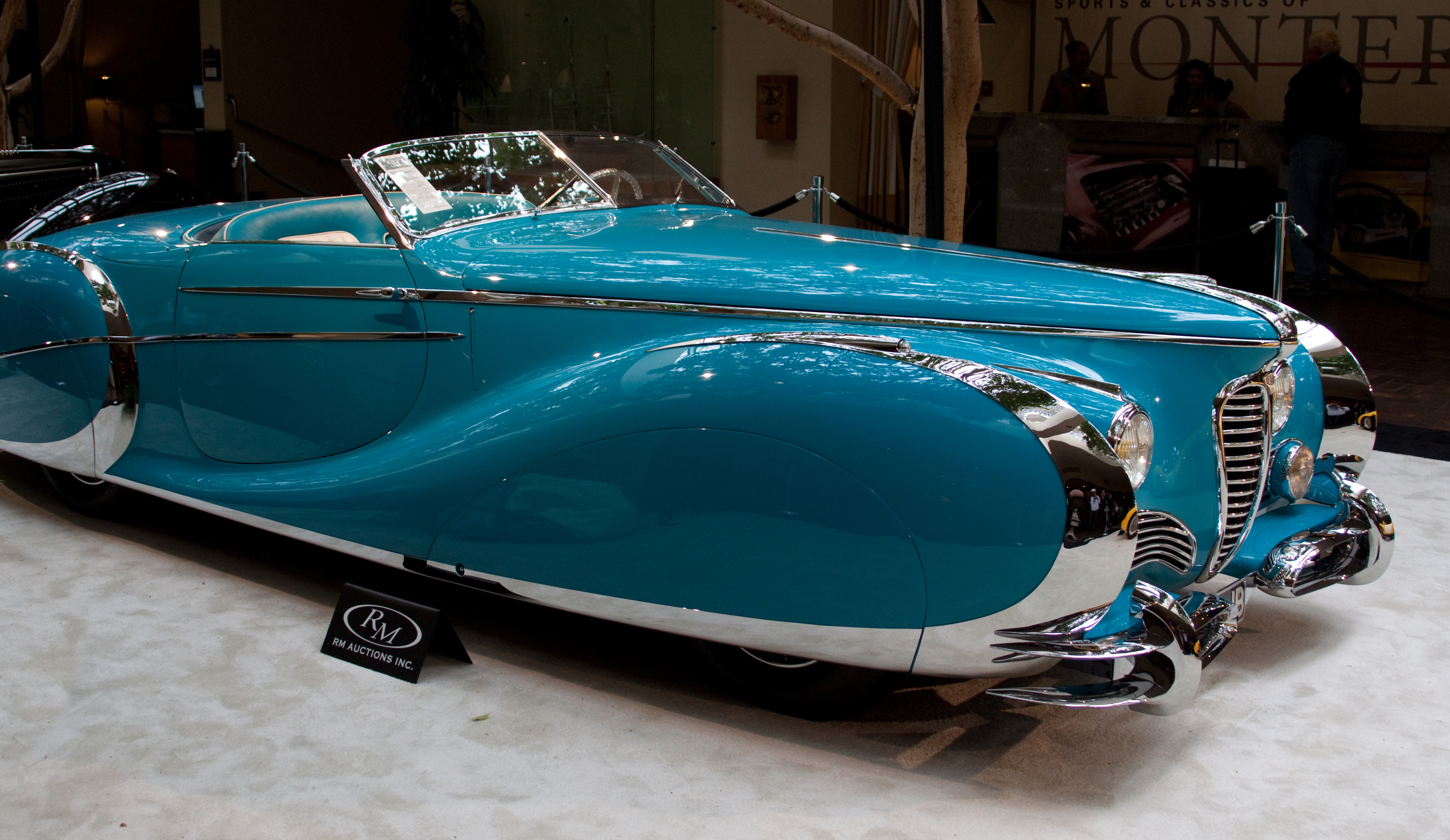
Delahaye 175S Roadster (1949) with coachwork by Saoutchik

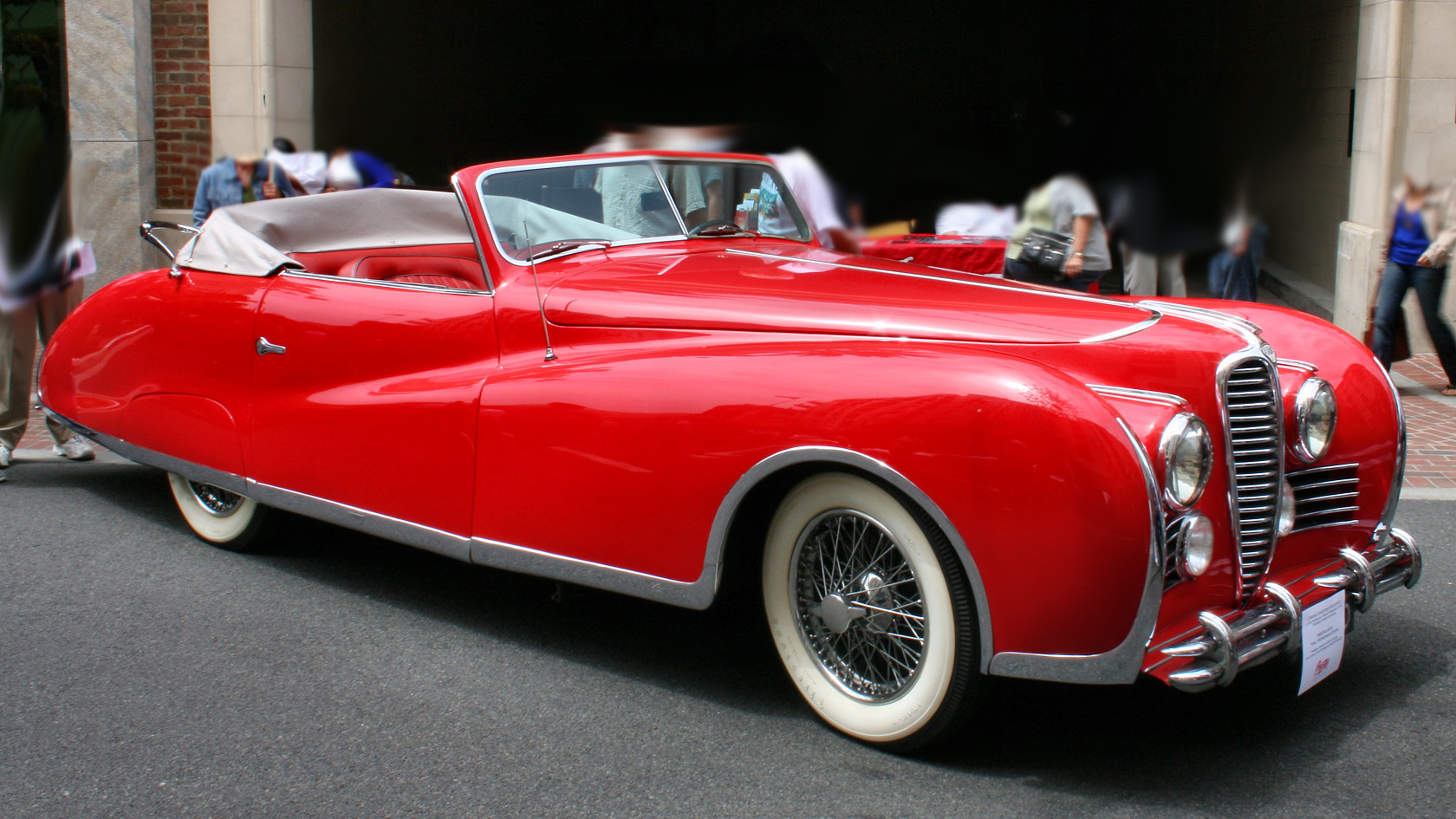
Delahaye 175 Drophead Coupé (1949), built for the Maharajah of Mysore and later owned by Elton John

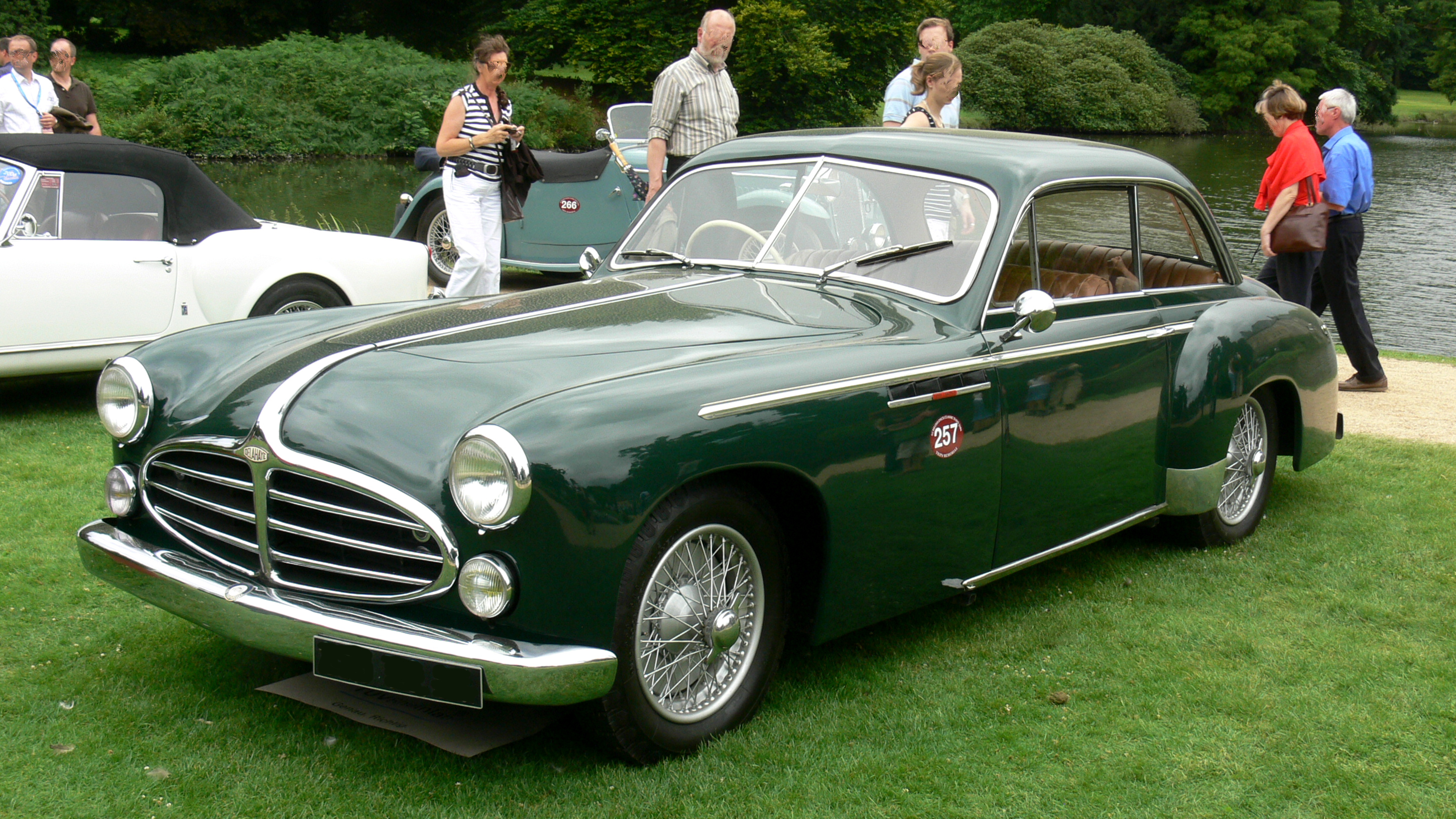
Delahaye 235MS Coupé (1953)

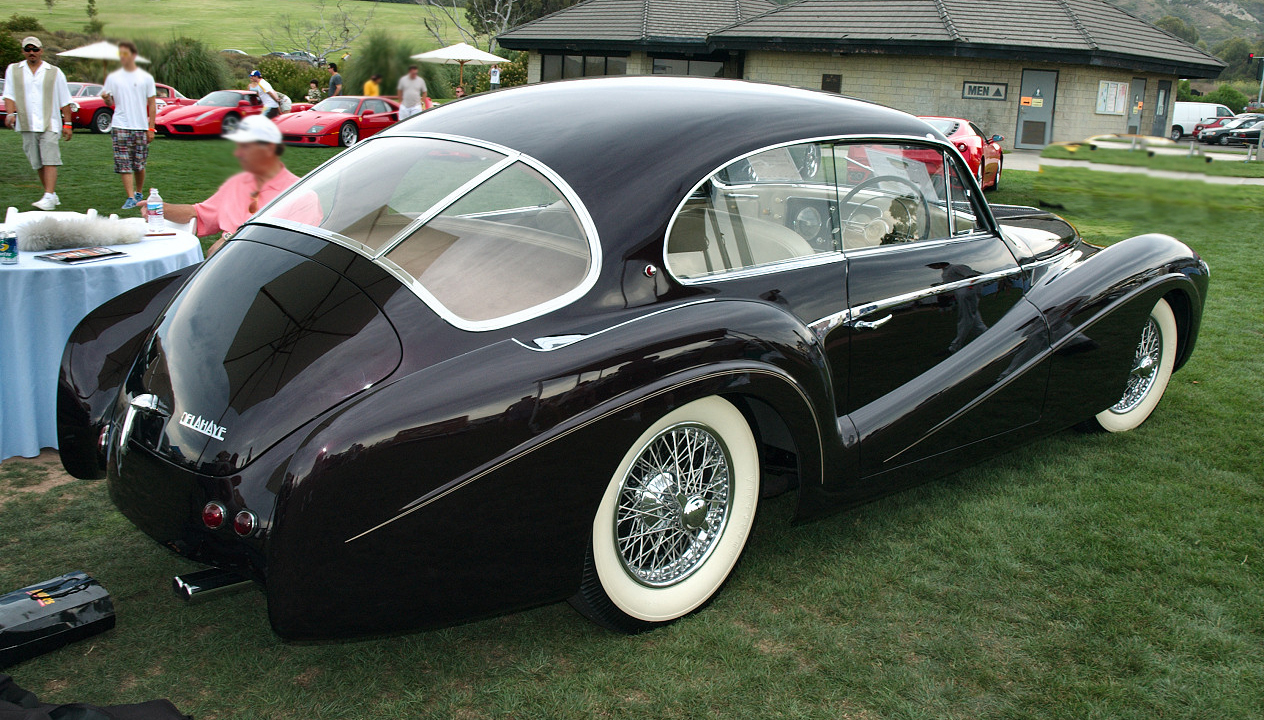
Delahaye 235M Saoutchik (1953)
