= Delahaye VLR =

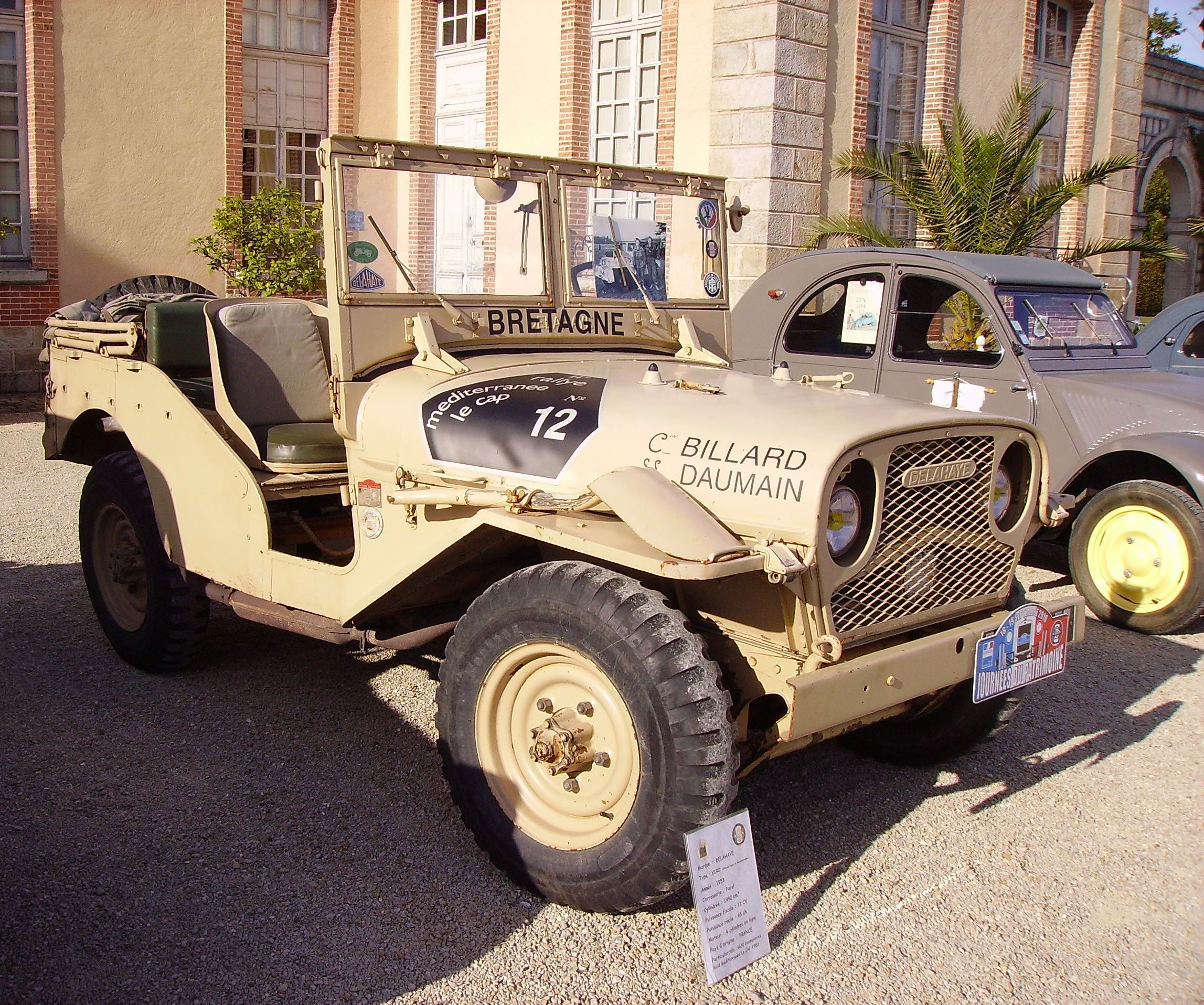

Overview
- Manufacturer: Delahaye
- Also called: (Véhicule léger de reconnaissance)
- Production: 1951–1954

Body and chassis
- Class: On- and Off-road vehicle
- Layout: Front engine, four-wheel drive

Powertrain
- Transmission: 4-speed all synchromesh manual with transfer box

Dimensions
- Length: 3,410 mm (134 in)
- Width: 1,570 mm (62 in)
- Height: 1,860 mm (73 in)
- Curb weight: 1,360 kg (3,000 lb)

The Delahaye VLR was a four-wheel-drive passenger vehicle clearly inspired by the Jeep and first presented, after an unusually long gestation, by Delahaye during the Summer of 1950. At a time when the luxury car market had been driven into freefall by a combination of government taxation policy and the depressed state of the postwar economy, the VLR was critical in keeping alive the company that produced it during the early 1950s.

"VLR" stood for Véhicule léger de reconnaissance (light reconnaissance vehicle). The name "VLRD" (Véhicule léger de reconnaissance Delahaye) is also sometimes used.

== Development ==
The vehicle featured a light metal ohc four-cylinder water-cooled engine of (initially) 1,992 cc and, by the standards of the time, a sophisticated suspension system. The four-speed gearbox featured synchromesh on all forward gears.

During the second half of 1950 the French army tested it extensively and declared themselves impressed. With only very minor modifications, they homologated the VLR for army use and placed an order for slightly more than 4,000. The company's main postwar production automobile, the Delahaye 175, had fared disastrously in the marketplace, with just 521 produced between 1947 and 1950, so the military order secured for the VLR was more than welcome.

The army were impressed by the performance of the vehicle both on and off-road, and the company was encouraged to try to sell VLRs into the civilian market. Civilian-market models were hard to distinguish from the military ones, but the 24-volt electrical system upon which the military had insisted was replaced, in the civilian VLRs, by a more conventional (for the time and vehicle's size) 12-volt electrical system. The VLR's civil-market price of above one and a half million francs was considered expensive (though much lower than the prices asked for the company's luxury passenger cars), and its mechanical complexity made it an unattractive proposition other than for rich owner-mechanics. It is worth bearing in mind that in the aftermath of a massive European war there were at this time a large number of second-hand Jeeps competing for the attention of anyone thinking to buy a civilian version of a VRC. Almost all of the 9,621 VLRs sold between 1951 and 1955 were accordingly sold to the military. Production was halted in March 1954, but vehicles were still being delivered in 1955.

The mechanical complexity of the vehicle, which excited much comment in the press and was blamed for its lack of sales success on the civilian market, was not seen as a problem by the army. In perfect conditions and when well maintained, the VLR performed admirably, but in real-world conditions it was very unreliable and they were also frequently crashed by undertrained drivers. Many VLRs had the differential locks removed, as these were often blamed for crashes. Nevertheless, by the mid-1950s the army had switched to the mechanically simpler Jeep, then being assembled in France by Hotchkiss under Willys license as the Hotchkiss M201. The Delahaye business itself was taken over by Hotchkiss in 1954, after which VLR production seems to have been quickly stopped.

== Technical data ==
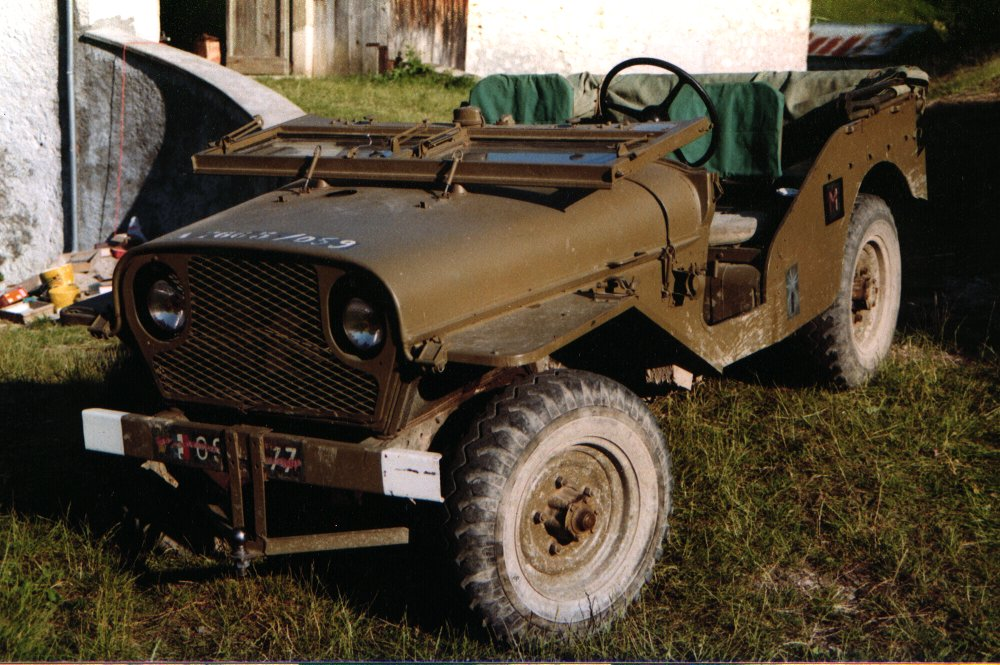
The military version as used by the French Army during the 1950s

Technical Data Delahaye VLR
Empty weight	1,360–1,460 kg (2,998–3,219 lb)
Max load	400 kg (882 lb)
Max trailer weight	750 kg (1,653 lb) (unbraked)
Width	1,570–1,630 mm (61.8–64.2 in)
Length	3,410–3,460 mm (134.3–136.2 in)
Height (roof up)	1,860 mm (73.2 in)
Height (roof down, screen down)	1,430 mm (56.3 in)
Wheelbase	2,150 mm (84.6 in)
Top speed	105 km/h (65 mph)
Ground clearance	340 mm (13.4 in)
Max tilt	70%
Wading depth	600 mm (23.6 in)
Motor	Four-stroke, 4-cylinder in-line, OHV
Engine capacity	1,992 cc 83.7 mm × 90.5 mm (3.30 in × 3.56 in)
Power	63 hp (46 kW)
Seats	5
