= Delahaye 235 =

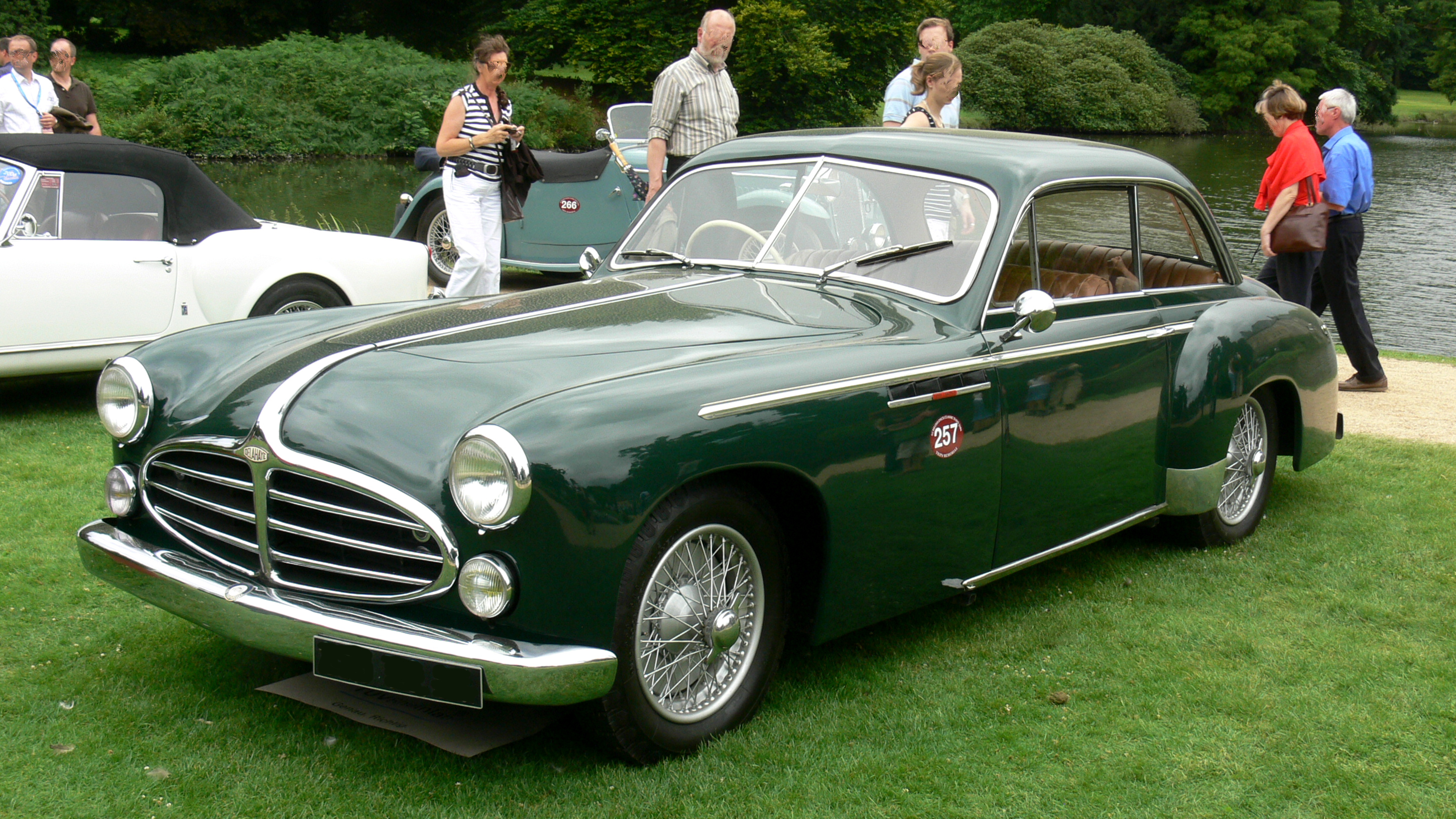
- Chapron "factory"-bodied 235

Overview
- Manufacturer: Delahaye
- Production: 1951–1954
- Designer: Philippe Charbonneaux

Body and chassis
- Class: Luxury car
- Layout: FR layout
- Related: Delahaye 175

Powertrain
- Engine: 3,557 cc straight-6, 152 hp
- Transmission: 4-speed pre-selector (Cotal)

Dimensions
- Wheelbase: 295 cm (116 in)
- Length: 455 cm (179 in)
- Width: 174 cm (69 in)
- Curb weight: bare chassis: 1,100 kg (2,400 lb) with body: ~1,500 kg (3,300 lb)

Chronology
- Predecessor: Delahaye 135M

The Delahaye 235 is a luxury car built by French manufacturer Delahaye from 1951 until 1954.

Presented at the 1951 Paris Auto Salon, the 235 was an attempt at updating the pre-war Type 135 for the 1950s. It competed with the Grégoire and Anjou models, built by Hotchkiss, another French luxury marque. Delahaye needed a boost, as combined production of the Types 135 and 175 (and the long wheelbase 178/180) had dropped to an abysmal 77 by 1951. Most noticeable was the new modern ponton-style bodywork, with the full-width front designed by chief designer Philippe Charbonneaux. The mechanics were credited to Fernand Lacour. The prototypes body was manufactured by Motto in Italy, and a total of 84 Types 235 were built. The 235 was originally sold only in chassis form and received bodywork from various coachbuilders, mainly Henri Chapron, but also from Figoni, Saoutchik, Antem, and others. The company's own business premises at the rue de Banquier in Paris were never tooled up to build car bodies for the 235, but in 1953, as a response to sluggish sales, a standardised "factory" bodywork ("coach d'usine") from Chapron became available. At 2,700,000 Francs, this represented a saving of nearly thirty percent over the bespoke coach-built versions.

The engine was the well known 3.6 liter inline six from the 135MS, here with three downdraught Solex carburettors and 152 hp (113 kW) at 4,200 rpm. The 235 effectively replaced the larger Type 175 in the marketplace, while the lesser 135M continued to be available until 1954. Top speed was around 170 km/h (106 mph). The brakes received a lot of criticism, as did fuel consumption; both issues arose largely due to the very heavy bodywork produced by the French coachbuilders who weren't as technologically advanced as their transalpine cousins.

The 235 appeared too late to have much effect on Delahaye's fortunes, still relying on 1930s technology in spite of its stylish and modern appearance. Not only was the 235 extremely expensive, a Chapron-bodied 235 going for 3,800,000 Francs, five times the price of a Citroën 15CV 'Big Six' and twice that of the much faster Jaguar XK120 in 1952, but the weak economy and steep taxation on large engined cars in post-war France also caused trouble for the brand. After the Delahaye VLR "Jeep" was passed over by the French army in favour of license built Hotchkiss Jeeps, Hotchkiss took over Delahaye in June 1954 and production of Delahaye cars ended shortly thereafter. 235s last appeared at the Paris Salon in 1954, to sell off the remaining stock, marking the end of Delahaye automobile manufacturing.

== Gallery ==
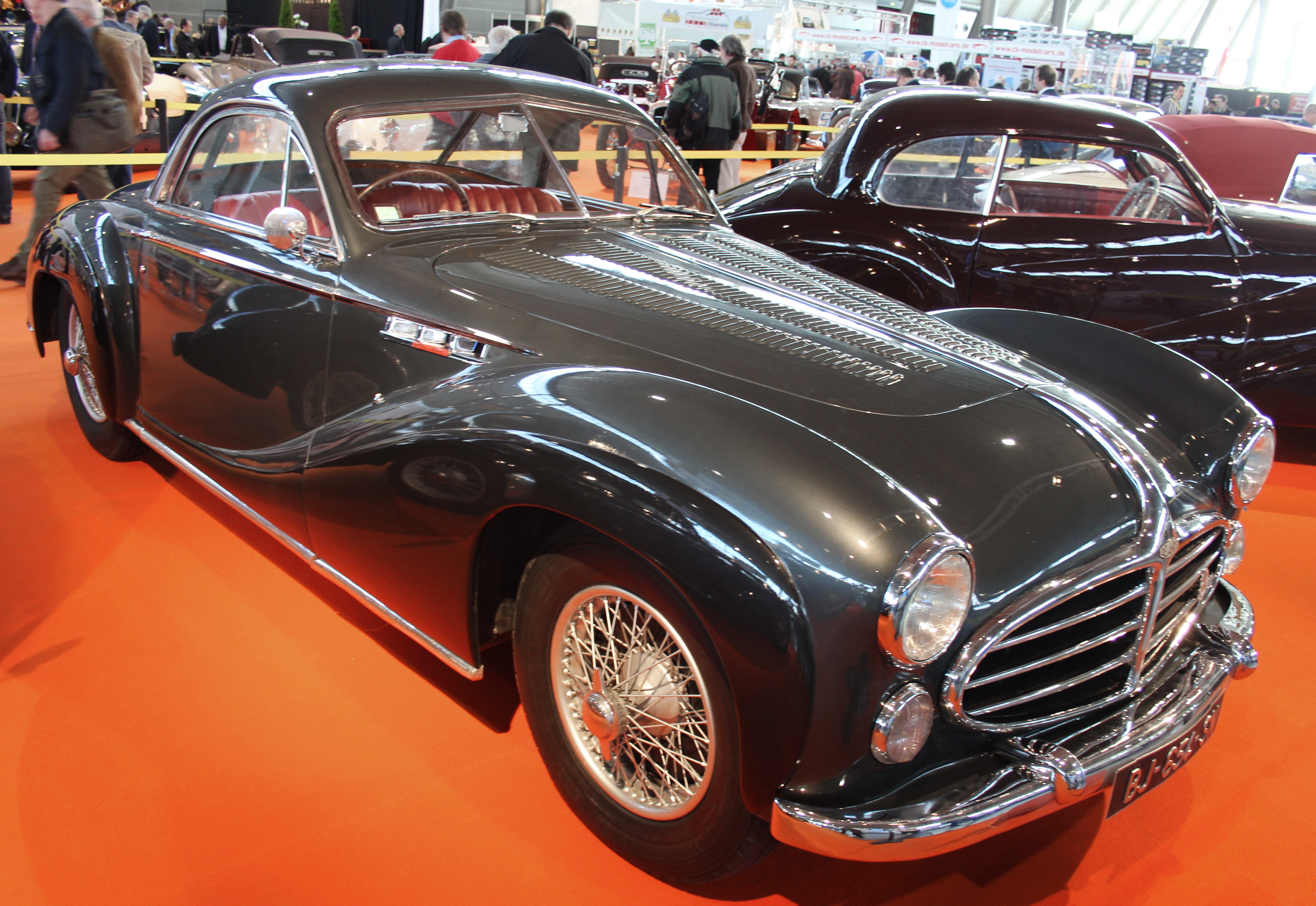
Delahaye 235 coupé bodied by Chapron

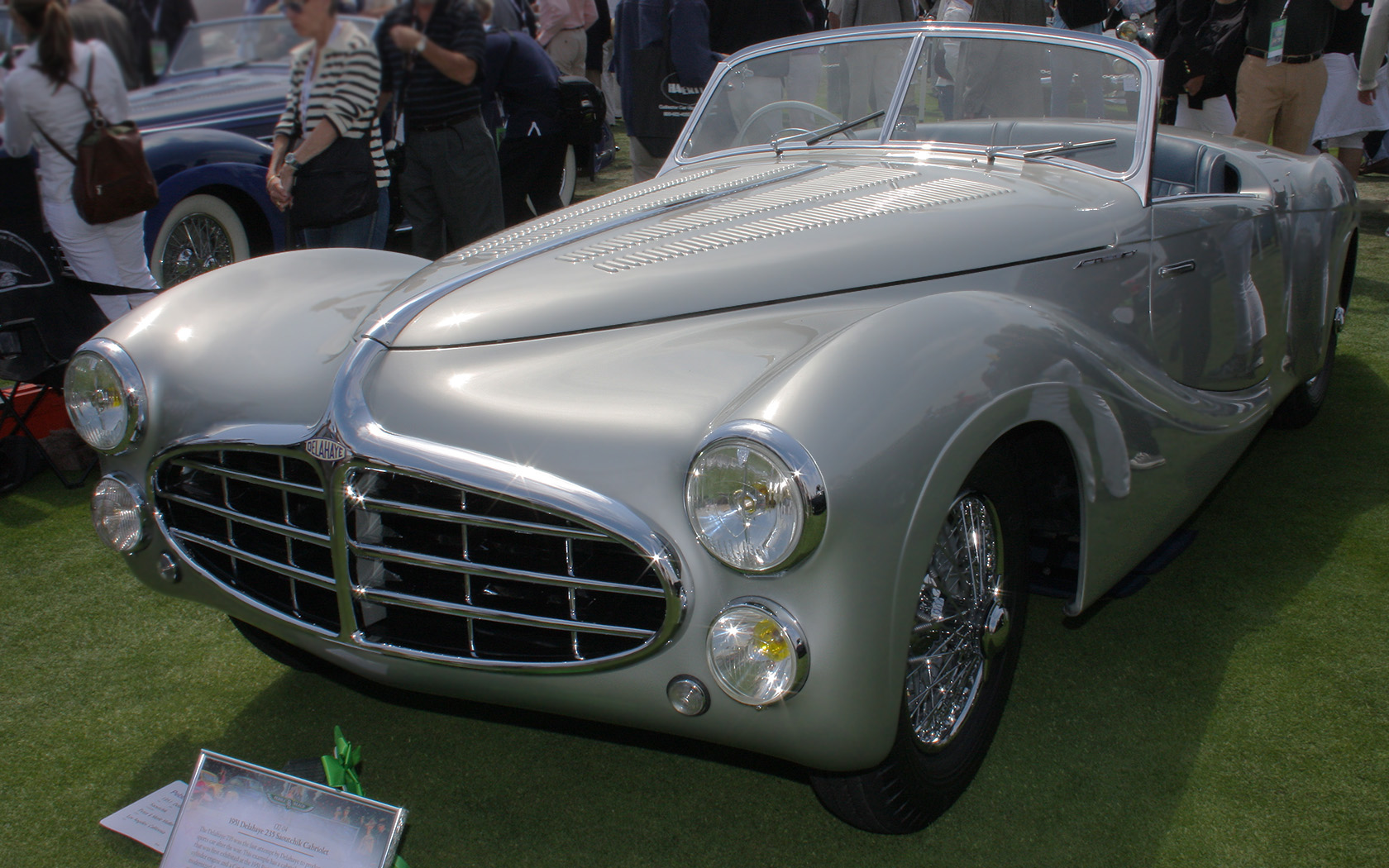
Delahaye 235 cabriolet bodied by Saoutchik

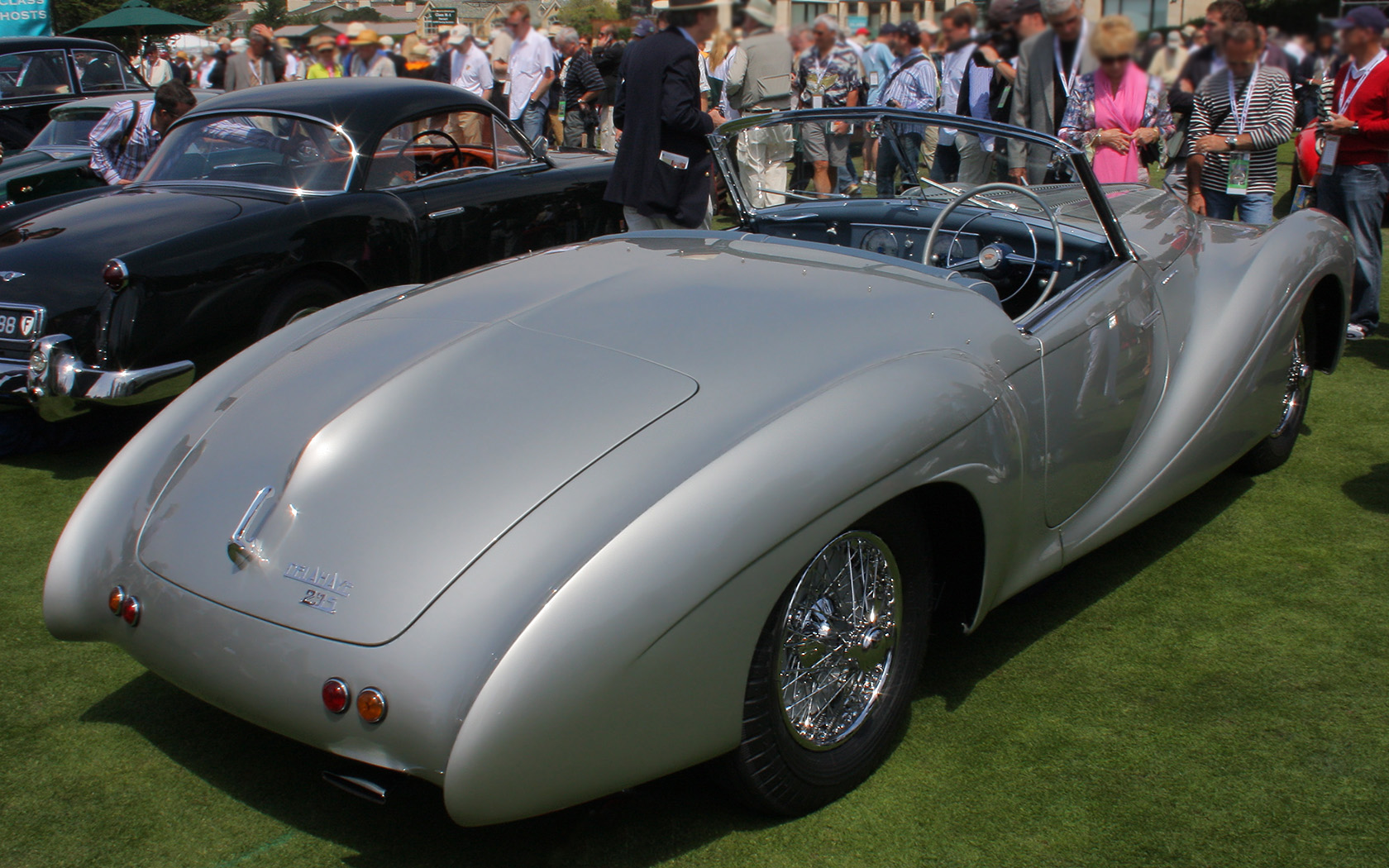
Rear view

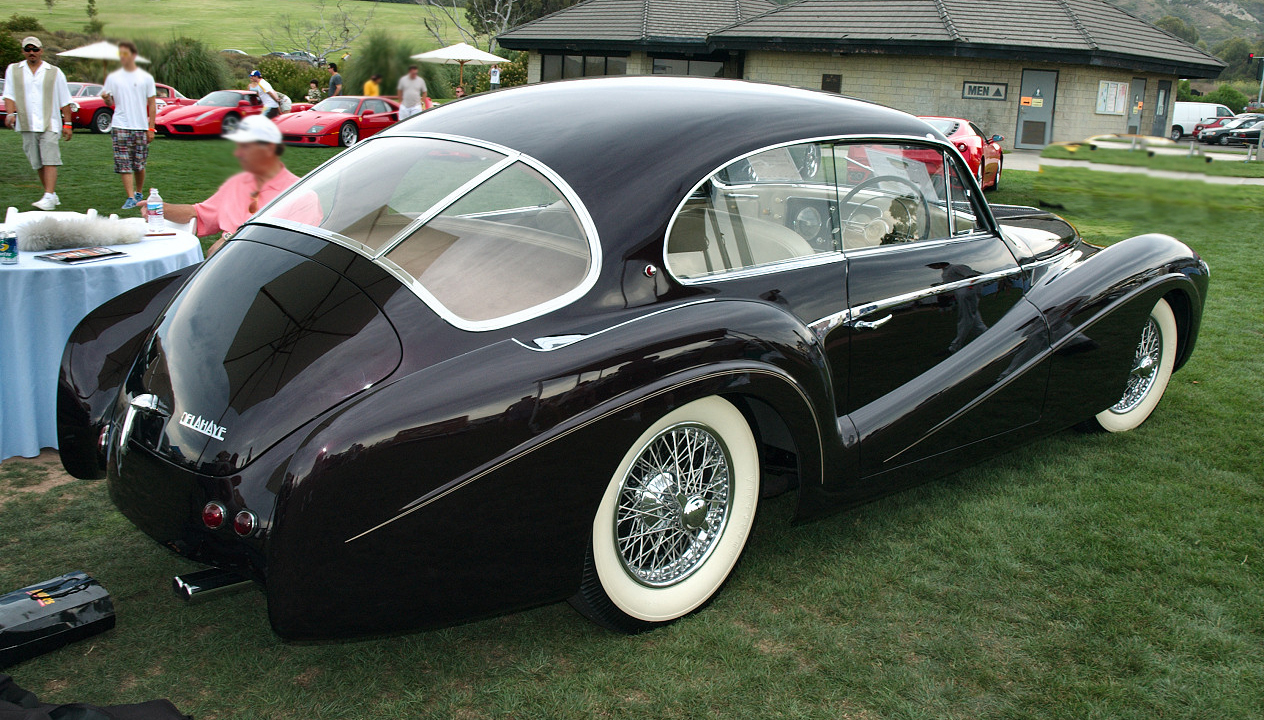
Delahaye 235M by Saoutchik
