= Delahaye 175 =

Delahaye 175/178/180
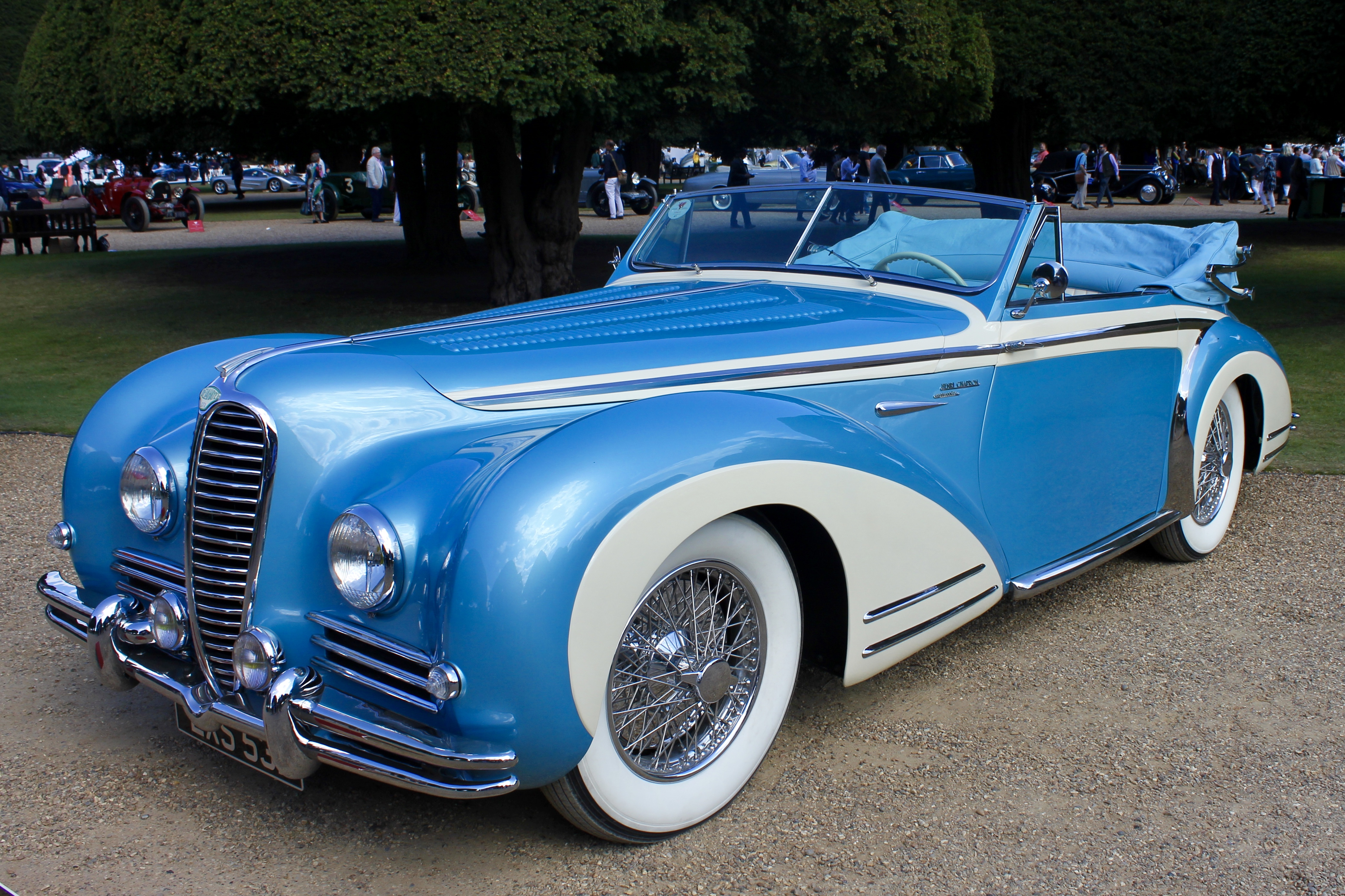
- 1948 Delahaye 175 S Grand Luxe bodied by Henri Chapron

Overview
- Manufacturer: Delahaye
- Production: 1948–1951
- Designer: Various coachbuilders

Body and chassis
- Class: Luxury car
- Body style: coachbuilt styles
- Layout: FR layout
- Related: Delahaye 135

Powertrain
- Engine: 4,455 cc type 183 OHV I6
- Transmission: 4-speed pre-selector (Cotal)

Dimensions
- Wheelbase: 2.95-metres
- Length: 4.62-metres
- Width: 1.69-metres
- Height: various
- Curb weight: 2,100 kg (4,600 lb)

Chronology
- Predecessor: Delahaye Type 165
- Successor: Delahaye Type 235

The Delahaye Type 175 is a coachbuilt luxury automobile manufactured by French automaker Delahaye. Production build numbers were formally recorded from early 1948 to mid 1951, validating that 107 cars were built in the mechanically cloned three wheelbase series comprising the Types 175/175S, 178 and 180.

This run of 4.5-litre chassis was offered in a variety of body-styles, exclusively built by coachbuilders. Delahaye did not have its own coachbuilding capability.

A 1953 fire in the administration and drawing offices destroyed most of its files and technical drawings. Consequently, little is known about the Type 175 and the longer-wheelbase Types 178 and 180.

Club Delahaye has recorded 25 surviving cars, out of the 107 confirmed built. There were 51 Type 175 cars, most being the optional 175S variant. There were 38 Type 178 cars, a few of which were built with 175S options that were not offered on that model. There were 18 Type 180 cars, two of which have the optional 175S engine, both being heavily armoured Chapron-bodied limousines built for the President and Vice President of France's Communist Party.

== Initial design ==
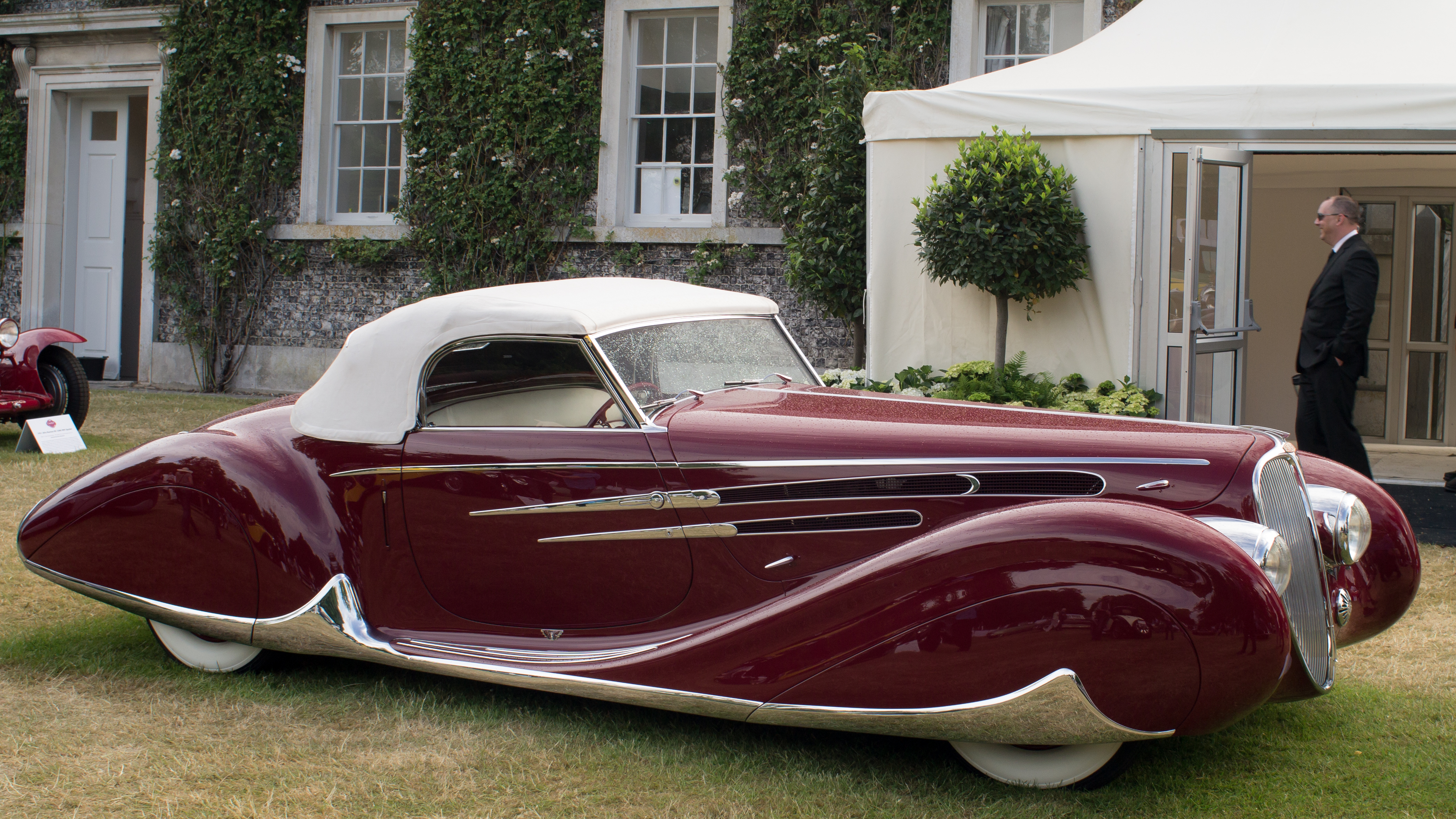
1939 Delahaye Type 165 Cabriolet, the predecessor to the 175

The Type 165, a 4.5-litre, V12 engined, grand-touring car, elevated Delahaye's prewar prestige but could not economically be sustained. The Type 165 was replaced by the 4.5-litre Type 175 in early 1948. Managing Director Charles Weiffenbach had planned to debut the Type 175 at the October 1939 Paris Auto Salon. The Paris Salon was where Delahaye received most of its purchase-orders, but the venue was cancelled without notice due to the impending German invasion.

The shareholders had decided that a simpler, practical, 4.5-litre engine - one litre larger than the Type 135, but familiar to Delahaye's workers - accompanied by a new, state-of-the-art chassis was to supersede the Type 165, and replace the Types 134, 135, 138 and 148L by 1940. That, however, did not occur as France was plunged into war in early June 1940.

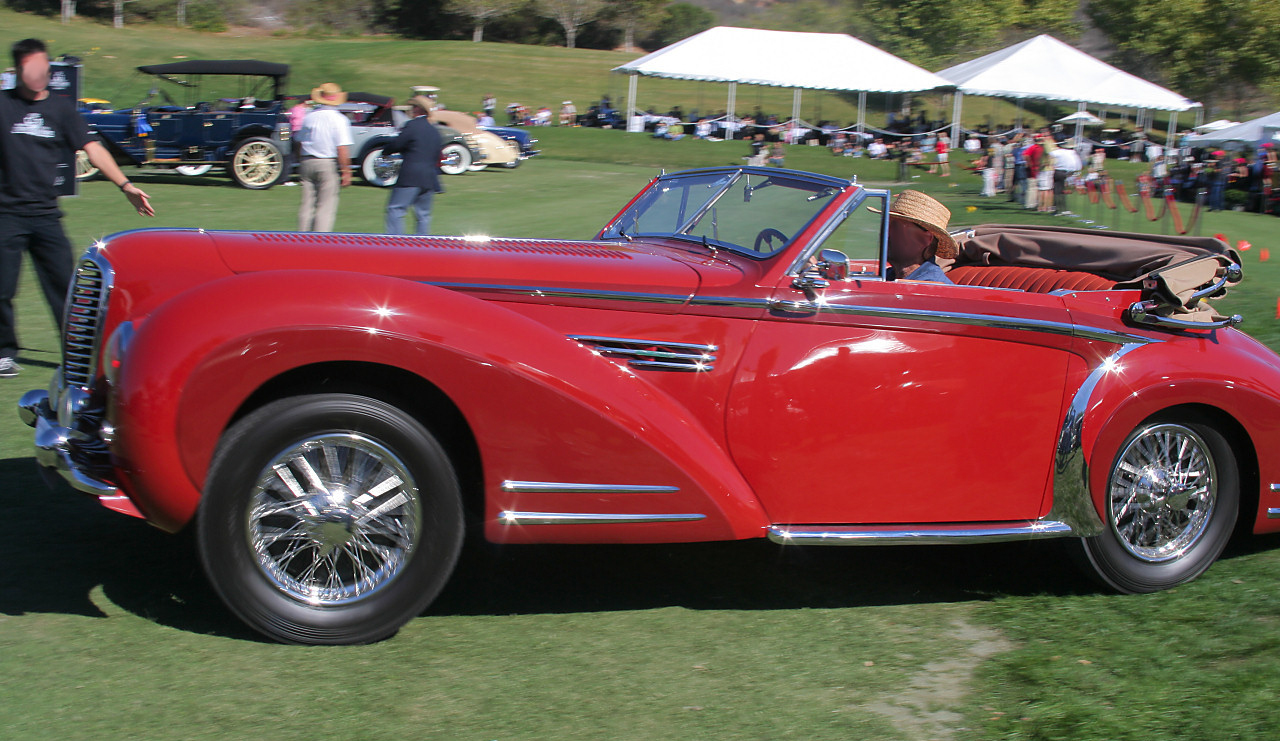
1947 Delahaye 175 bodied by Henri Chapron

The prototype evolved beyond its initial 1939 guise and was finally presented to the shareholders for production approval in March 1944. The four-wheel independent suspension was a first for Delahaye, and it was the first Delahaye to be built exclusively in left-hand drive. Testing of the untried and unproven mechanicals was not yet possible, due to the ongoing German occupation of Paris and the factory. The introduction had to await the belated return of the Paris Auto Salon, in October 1946.

After the war, the Types 135 and 148L had to be re-introduced, to generate cashflow. The company's Delage D6-70 model continued as it was before the war, but the straight-eight engined Delage D8-120 was discontinued.

The Type 175 had a naturally aspirated, 4.5-litre, overhead-valve, inline six-cylinder engine, with seven rather than four main bearings. The chassis featured Dubonnet independent front suspension built under license; an independent De Dion rear suspension system; large diameter, deeply finned drums on a dual Lockheed hydraulic brake system; a four-speed, semi-automatic Cotal transmission manufactured by MAAG; left-hand drive for the first time by Delahaye; and eighteen inch wheels. The cockpit floor was welded to the bottom of the chassis to act as a stressed structural member, adding strength and torsional rigidity.

Six pre-production chassis were completed by 1946; five of them were given chassis numbers 90001; 91001; 91002; 92001, and 92002. The incompletely assembled show chassis seen at the Paris Auto Salon to represent the optional Type 175S was not numbered. The first three chassis Type 175 units, and the final two (prefixed '920') were of the somewhat longer 178 type. There was no preseries Type 180 chassis.

Of the 51 cars built on the short, 2.95-meter wheelbase Type 175 chassis, 12 cars reportedly exist, most being the optional variant with three Solex 40-AiP carburetors, and chromed Rudge-Whitworth wire wheels. Those were the only factory options, limited to the Type 175S; but exceptions were made. Of the 38 Type 178s built on the median length, 3.15-meter wheelbase chassis, 7 are recorded as surviving. And, of the 18 long, 3.35-metre wheelbase Type 180 chassis, 6 survive.

The postwar front design was created by in-house industrial designer Philippe Charbonneaux, who developed the distinctive Delahaye "face". His effort provided the design of the entire front with a narrower, elongated, heart-shape grille with horizontal bars, and low horizontal grilles on each side. Delahaye required its coachbuilders to use the new frontal aspect although coachbuilders Joseph Figoni, Henri Chapron, Jacques Saoutchik, and Marcel Pourtout, obtained authorized artistic license.

== Chassis ==
The new 175/178/180 series chassis introduced the semi-monocoque concept. These units were completely different from the foregoing Type 135 and its longer wheelbase iterations, the Type 148L and Type 235, in width, proportions, and structure. The stressed-steel floor-pan was welded integrally around the bottom perimeter of the passenger compartment, providing exceptional rigidity. The chassis was larger, wider, and heavier, than the Type 135. It had parallel side-rails, that were boxed, instead of being open channels. Previous models' frame-rails tapered from the aft cockpit cross-member forward, whereas the three new models' cockpits were parallel-sided rectangles, setting the precedent.

The Types 135, 145, 148, 155, and 165 had the identical, proprietary, independent front suspension system shared with Delage and Talbot. In contrast, the all-new 4.5-liter chassis employed a sophisticated Dubonnet independent front suspension, licensed to Delahaye by its inventor.

The independent Dubonnet front suspension system was in use prior to the Delahaye, having been licensed to General Motors in 1933, as well as by Alfa-Romeo, Simca, and Vauxhall. After WW2, only Vauxhall and Delahaye retained the Dubonnet system. Others had moved on to the unequal-length A-arm system, pioneered by Cadillac head engineer Maurice Olly. The GMC system was licensed by Rolls-Royce, for its Phantom-111 and Wraith models, and it subsequent postwar Silver Dawn, Silver Wraith and Bentley Mk-6.

Dubonnet systems proved problematic, unless fastidiously maintained. Oil-seal leaks caused seizures, and suspension collapses. Accidental damages were sustained by an undisclosed number of early cars in the 175/178/180 series. Parts failure reports doomed the new series to failure, irreparably damaging Delahaye's reputation.

The excessive weight of traditional hardwood body-frames clad in mild steel, hand-hammered and welded steel-panelled coachwork, mounted atop these already heavy chassis, adversely affected acceleration and speed, while compromising handling. French coachbuilders employed antiquated, traditional, building methods and materials. They were oblivious to weight. Only Henri Chapron, and Olivier Lecanu-Deschamp, were familiar with forming and welding aluminum. Other French coachbuilders were creating their bodies with steel sheets mechanically fastened over hardwood body-frames. Consequently, they were inordinately heavy, and contributed to mechanical failures experienced by an estimated dozen early purchasers. Broken suspension components resulted in Delahaye being obliged to buy back the offending cars at considerable expense, to circumvent litigation, and negative publicity.

The Type 175S racing-engines Delahaye developed for Charles Pozzi, and racing-team Ecurie Lutetia co-owner and French champion driver Eugène Chaboud, reportedly had a 9.1:1 compression ratio, which with three dual-choke carburetors, delivered over 220 horsepower. These two 4.5-litre displacement racecars were parallel in horsepower to three of the four Type 145 cars (48772, 48773, and 48775). The more highly tuned number 48771, after racing performance expert Fernand Lacour directed his efforts to develop a recorded 244.8 horsepower.

The new 4.5-litre engine carried the "183" casting-code. They were built in two visibly discerned forms: the initial series engines were stamped Type 1AL-183, as were used in all six pre-production units; the factory prototype; and the subsequent five Type 175S racing-engines; most of the production engines were stamped Type 2AL-183, with the exception of the optional Type 175S-equipped chassis.

The Type 2AL changes were made for improved production efficiency, manufacturing costs, and enhanced profitability.

== History ==
After having spent four years of World War II building railroad rolling stock parts for German trains, Delahaye was then included in deputy director General Paul-Marie Pons' 1945 plan Pons for French industry and engineering. This was a five-year program to rebuild French industry, and source incoming capital for French companies. The plan designated Delahaye to build sports and luxury cars for the export market, to generate foreign currency. Over 80 percent of the company's automobile chassis were exported to France's colonies, including in Africa and Asia.

In consideration of the expense of producing the complicated, unreliable, impractical V-12 used in the four Type 145 sports-racers; and, the Type 155 monoposto (all five V12 racecars were made exclusively for Lucy O'Reilly Schell for her team Écurie Bleue), as well as the four Type 165 grand-touring cars, V12 production ended in late 1938, with twelve sets of engine parts made, resulting in those nine cars.

The V-12 was replaced by a new, conventional, less complex, inline, overhead-valve, six-cylinder engine of the same 4.5-liter engine displacement.

The show-chassis debuted in optionally equipped Type 175S form, with a partially built body by Letourneur et Marchand, introducing Delahaye's new postwar "face". It was one of the few new machines at the first postwar Paris Auto Salon, in October 1946. It garnered considerable attention, and Delahaye's first model to be manufactured exclusively in left-hand-drive.

The chassis was neither fully developed nor adequately tested by October 1946, before parts were put into production in late November 1947. Problems with the Dubonnet front suspension soon became apparent. Disgruntled owners experienced parts failures, and sustained accidental damages. Delahaye was obliged to buy back an undisclosed number of defective cars, at great expense to the company, to defuse litigation and curtail negative publicity.

The extended delivery delay, into early 1948, instead of 1946, was due to chief design-engineer Jean Francois' unanticipated death, in April 1944. Delahaye had nobody qualified to take his place.

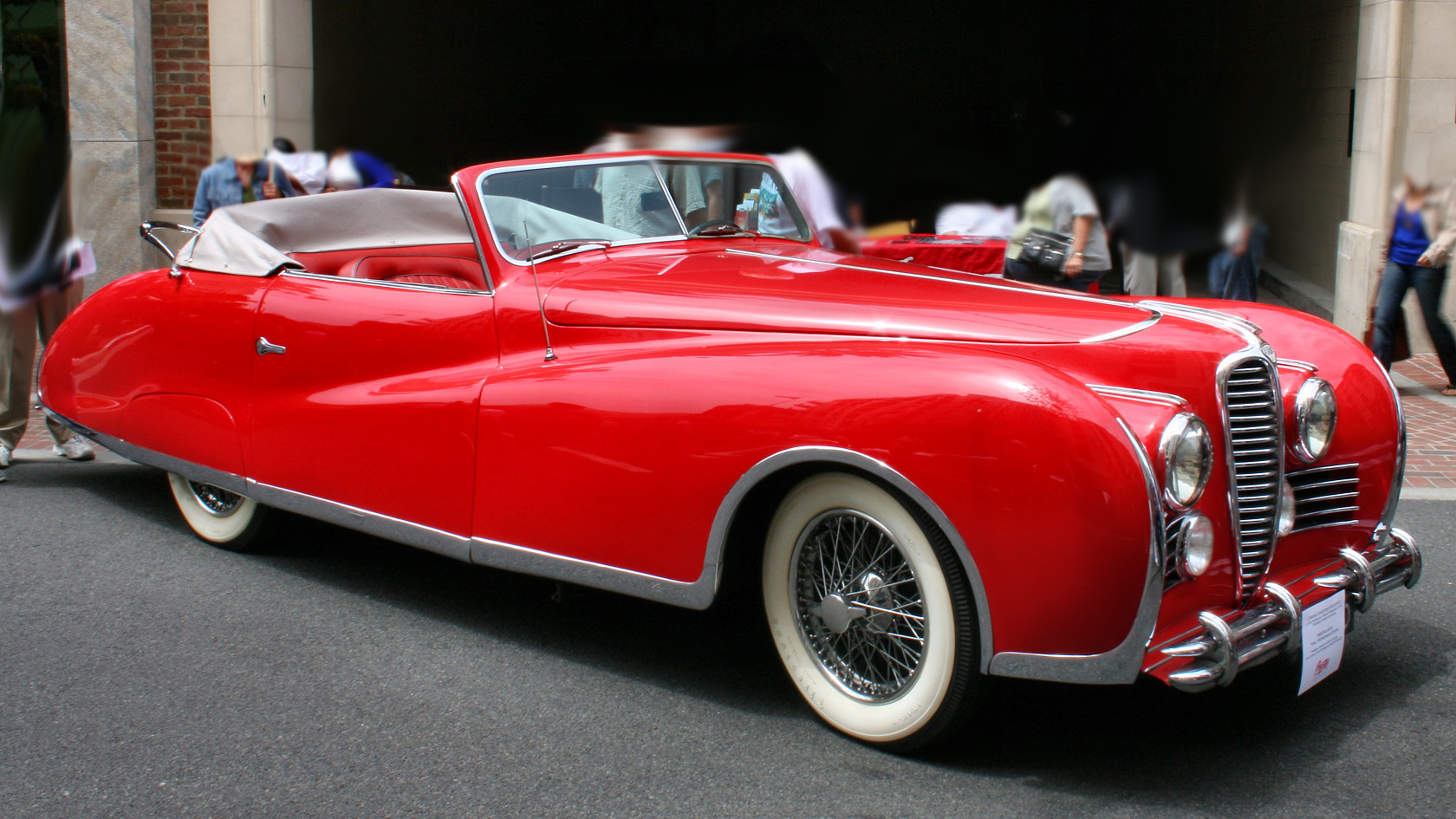
Delahaye 175 Drophead Coupé (1949), once owned by Elton John

1947 Delahaye 175S competition version

The production build number list verified that 51 Type 175 chassis were built (815001 to 815051), including the Type 175S Show-chassis, that was cycled back into production, after the October 1949 show. It likely went into the tail-end of Type 175S production.

While not a success in the marketplace, a Type 175S won the 1951 Monte Carlo Rally, This car (815042) finished twelfth in the Carrera Panamericana, while a second Motto-bodied 175S coupe (815051) was disqualified on a technicality.

The optional 175S had three Solex 40AiP carburettors and Rudge wire-spoked wheels, but was otherwise identical to the standard Type 175, with a short, 2.95-metre wheelbase. The other two longer wheelbased versions were the Types 178 and 180, with a single Solex carburetor, and stamped steel wheels. The standard 175 had a reported 140 horsepower, with 161 hp for the 175S. The Production Build List confirms there were 38 of the 3.15-metre wheelbase Type 178 chassis; and, 18 of the 3.35-meter Type 180, built and 180 (333.5 cm) mainly for heads of state, dignitaries, corporate executives, and the like. Two Chapron armoured Type 180 limousines were built for the leaders of the French Communist Party in 1948. A prototype "Delage D180" was also developed on this basis, but was not put into production. Delahaye focused its Delage production on the D6-70 model.

Total production of three-chassis series, including the prototype, and the show-chassis, was 107 automobiles. (substantiated by Club Delahaye president Jean-Paul Tissot, from archived company records)

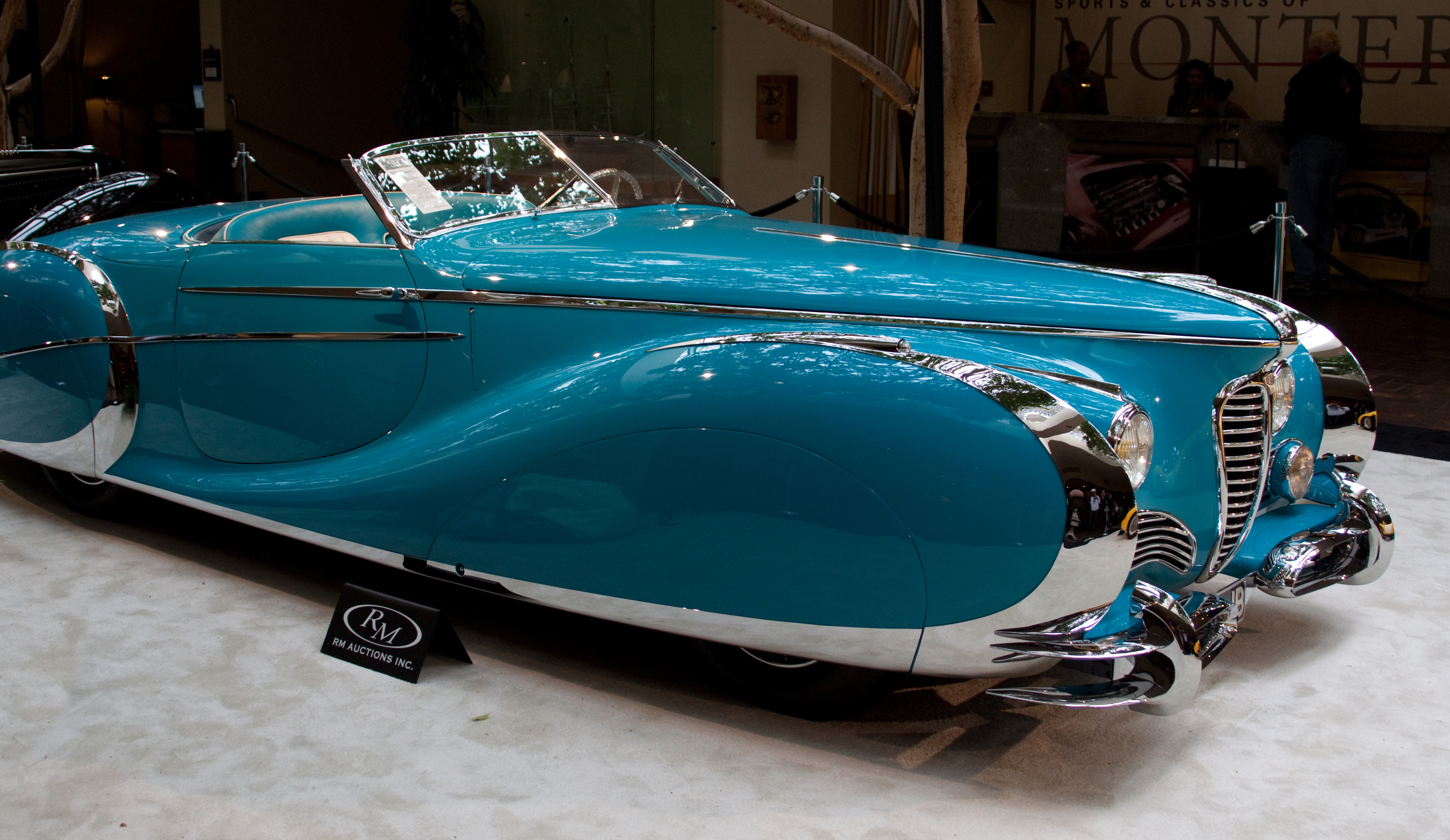
Diana Dors' flamboyant 175S Roadster

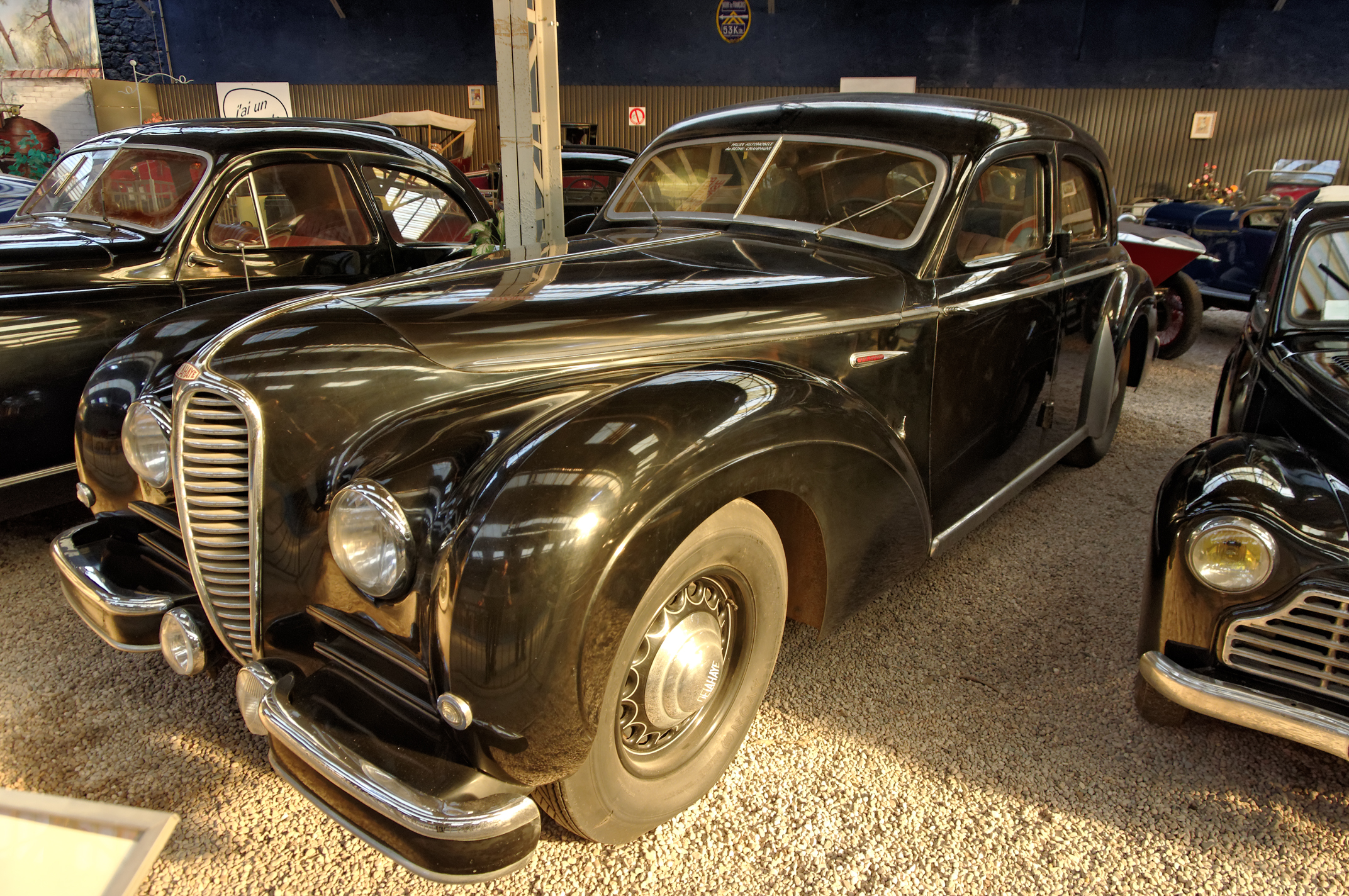
1948 Delahaye 180 (long wheelbase)

The rear-wheel drive Type 175, 178 and 180 chassis is considerably more sophisticated than its Type 135 predecessor. The independent front suspension had horizontally pivoting cylindrical housings that contained a coil-spring and hydraulic shock absorber immersed in an oil-bath Dubonnet. The rear was by de Dion, with semi-elliptical springs. Brakes were dual system hydraulic by Lockheed. The brake-drums were deeply finned cast-iron, actuated by dual master cylinders with a balance-bar.

The custom bodies of these cars were often much too heavy for what the chassis had originally been engineered for. In dry conditions, they were fast cars, but wet-weather handling was unpredictable. Another culprit was inferior quality of high-tensile-strength steel in the early postwar era. The specified grade was depleted by the war, and what little was produced was allocated by the French government, which did not prioritize luxury carmakers. The Types 175, 178 and 180 ceased production in 1951. Although Delahaye managed to introduce the Type 235 in 1951, it was only an updated variation of the Type 135. Delahaye and Delage combined production dropped from 511 in 1949 to 41 in 1952 and 36 in 1953.

In desperation to salvage the company after the devastating 1953 fire, Managing Director Weiffenbach tried to amalgamate with various French automakers, to no avail. He eventually orchestrated a Delahaye shareholder-approved merger, as the minority partner, with Hotchkiss. Delahaye (and Delage) closed down for good on December 31, 1954. Hothkiss in turn merged with weapons manufacturers Brandt in 1956.

== Bibliography ==
- Hull, Peter. Delahaye: Famous on Road and Race Track, in Ward, Ian. World of Automobiles, Volume 5, pp. 521–524. London: Orbis, 1974.
