= Hotchkiss Artois =

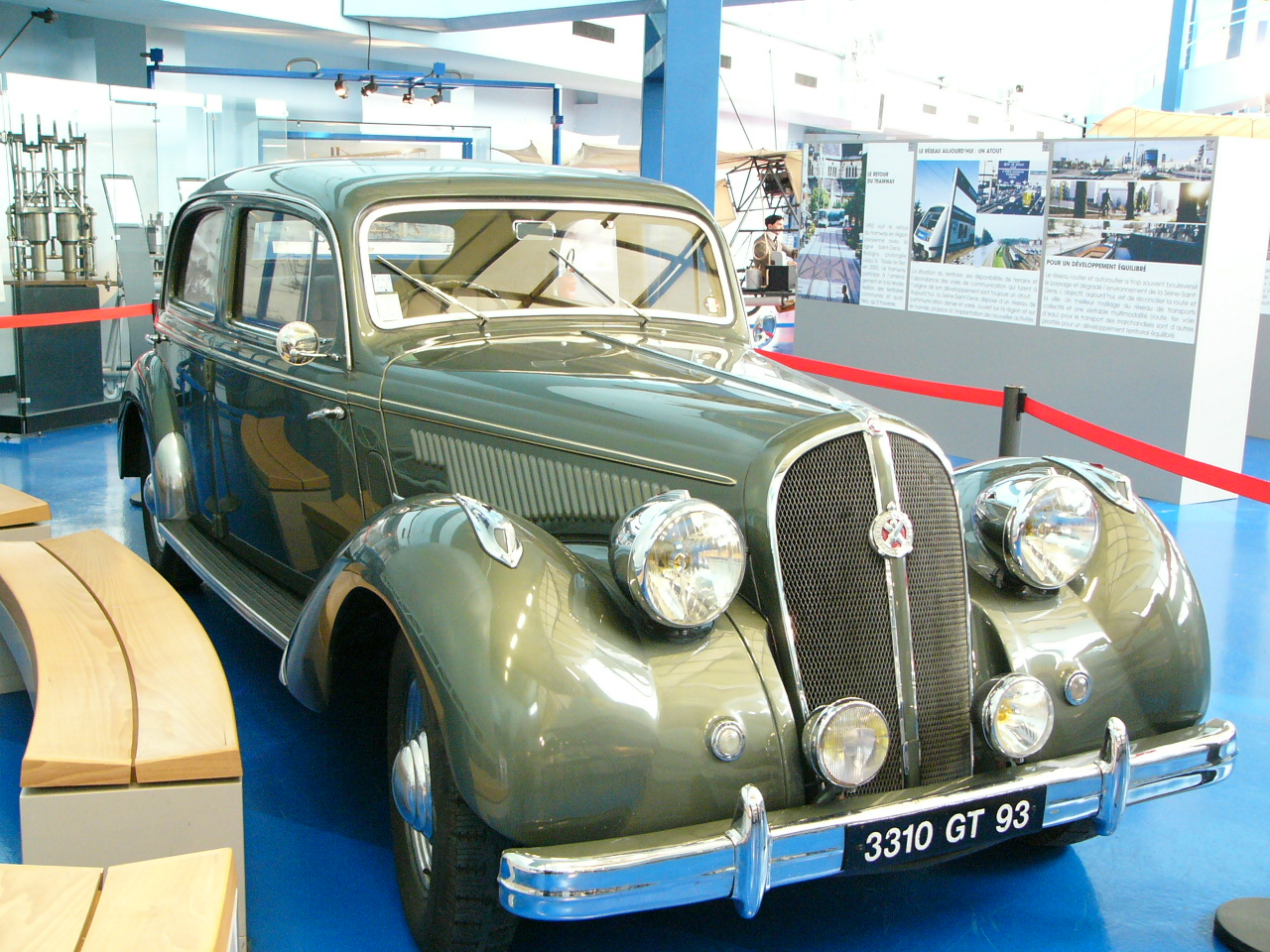

Overview
- Manufacturer: Automobiles Hotchkiss
- Production: 1948–1950 approx 2,000 produced

Body and chassis
- Class: luxury saloon
- Body style: 4-door sedan
- Layout: FR layout

Powertrain
- Engine: 2312 cc OHC I4; 3485 cc OHC I6

Dimensions
- Wheelbase: 2,920 mm (115.0 in)
- Length: 4,760 mm (187.4 in)
- Width: 1,780 mm (70.1 in)
- Height: 1,630 mm (64.2 in)

The Artois is a luxury car produced from 1948 to 1950 by the French automaker Hotchkiss.

The Artois was presented at the Paris Motor Show in October 1948 as a replacement for the Hotchkiss 864.

Mechanically the car did not represent any great advance. The engine was the 4-cylinder in-line 2312 cc engine from the 864. Claimed power was raised from 58 hp to 70 hp, however, presumably reflecting the higher compression ratios made possible with the slow reappearance of higher octane fuels after the Second World War.

In addition, a 6-cylinder 3485cc-engined version was offered, using the engine from the company's 620 and 866 models, but with stated power output reduced from 125 hp to 110 hp in order to avoid competing too directly with the more expensive models.

The stated top speed was 120 km/h (75 mph) for the four-cylinder car and 140 km/h (91 mph) for the six-cylinder model.

Independent front suspension represented an advance over the rigid front axle arrangement of the predecessor model.

Visually the Artois was almost indistinguishable from the Hotchkiss 864 until 1949 when the car underwent a minor facelift which involved repositioning the lights at the front of the car.

In 1950 the Artois was replaced by the modernized Hotchkiss Anjou and the innovative, front-wheel drive Hotchkiss Grégoire.
