= Hotchkiss Anjou =

Hotchkiss H Anjou
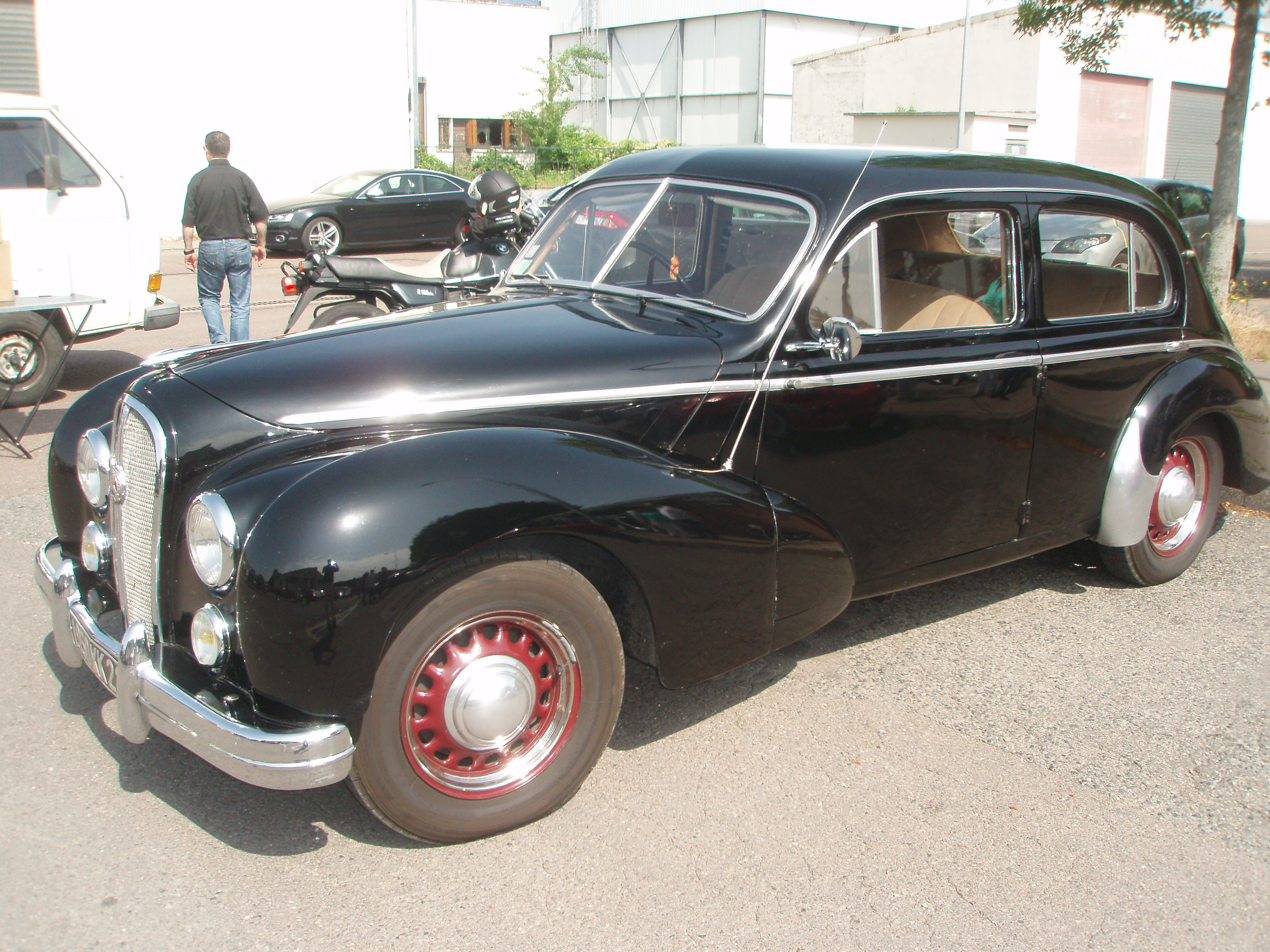

Overview
- Manufacturer: Hotchkiss
- Production: 1950–1954; 5,465 produced

Body and chassis
- Class: luxury saloon
- Body style: 4-door sedan 2-door cabriolet ("Anthéor"); 2-door coupé
- Layout: FR layout

Powertrain
- Engine: 2312 cc OHC I4; 3485 cc OHC I6

Dimensions
- Wheelbase: 2,920 mm (115.0 in); 4-cylinder cars 3,090 mm (121.7 in); 6-cylinder cars
- Length: 4,850 mm (190.9 in); 4-cylinder cars 5,000 mm (196.9 in); 6-cylinder cars
- Width: 1,770 mm (69.7 in)
- Height: 1,550 mm (61.0 in)
- Curb weight: 1,350–1,450 kg (2,980–3,200 lb)

Chronology
- Predecessor: Hotchkiss 486 (4-cylinder); Hotchkiss 866 (6-cylinder)

The Hotchkiss Anjou was a luxury car offered between 1950 and 1954 by the French automaker Automobiles Hotchkiss. It was an updated version of the 486 and 686/866 models which had first appeared in the 1930s and inherited its engines from those cars, although their engines in turn dated back to OHC units introduced in the mid-1920s.

The car was launched in autumn 1950, and during the first year 1,787 were produced. In 1951 the company produced a further 2,666. The depressed state of the economy and the government’s punitive taxation policy, especially in respect of larger cars, saw to it that, at least in terms of units produced, 1951 was the car's best year, however. 815 were produced in 1952 and only 197 in 1953. 1953 was the last year of production, but the company was still advertising new cars for sale at least until the end of 1954, which indicates that their financial problems may well have been exacerbated by the practice of systematically manufacturing more cars than they were selling earlier in the Anjou's life.

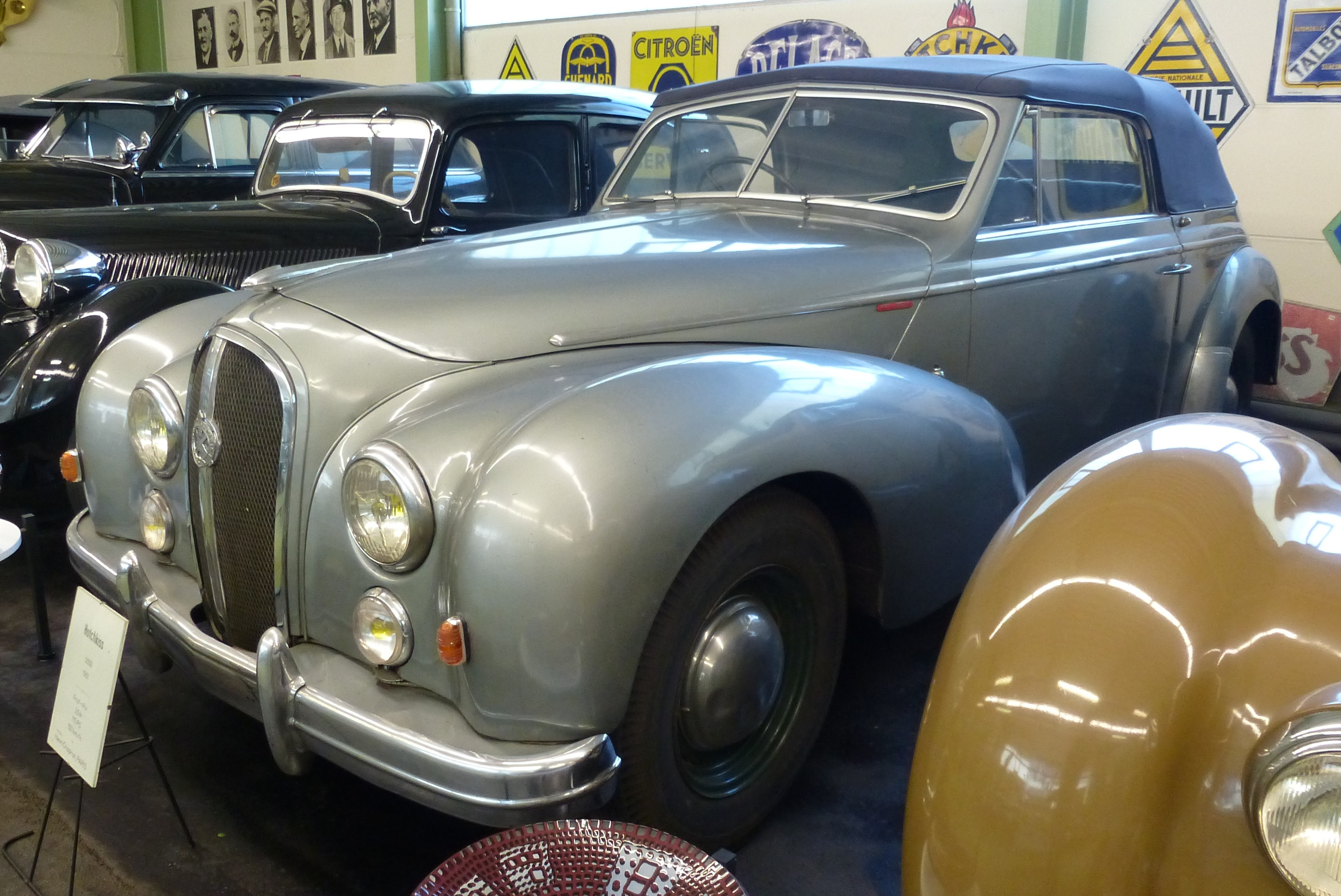
1951 Hotchkiss Anthéor cabriolet

The Anjou came with a large limousine-style body significantly modified when compared to its predecessors and characteristic of the times. A small number of two-door coupés were produced as well as a 2-door cabriolet, branded as the Hotchkiss Anthéor. Carrosserie Worblaufen in Switzerland also built two four-door Cabriolets based on the 2050.

There was a choice of two engine sizes. Most cars were 1350s, shipped with a four-cylinder OHC 2,312 cc water-cooled unit with one or, at the customer's option, two carburettors. However, a longer-nosed version allowed space for the larger ohc six-cylinder 3,485 cc water-cooled engine that promoted the car into the stratospheric 20CV taxation class, but increased claimed maximum power from 72/75 hp to 100/125 hp, with a corresponding increase in claimed maximum speed from 130 km/h (81 mph) to 145 km/h (90 mph). Sources for the power output vary, possibly according to whether the engine was fed by one or two carburettors.

Both cars were offered with so-called "classic" four-speed manual transmission, and the smaller-engined car was available with an optional electromagnetic Cotal gearbox, which is seen by some as a precursor to more modern automatic transmission systems, and which would also have stood out from the crowd at any time on account of its having featured four forward speeds and four reverse speeds.

In addition to the 5,465 Anjous produced, the company built about 40 of the 2-door cabriolet Anthéor models.
