= Hotchkiss Grégoire =

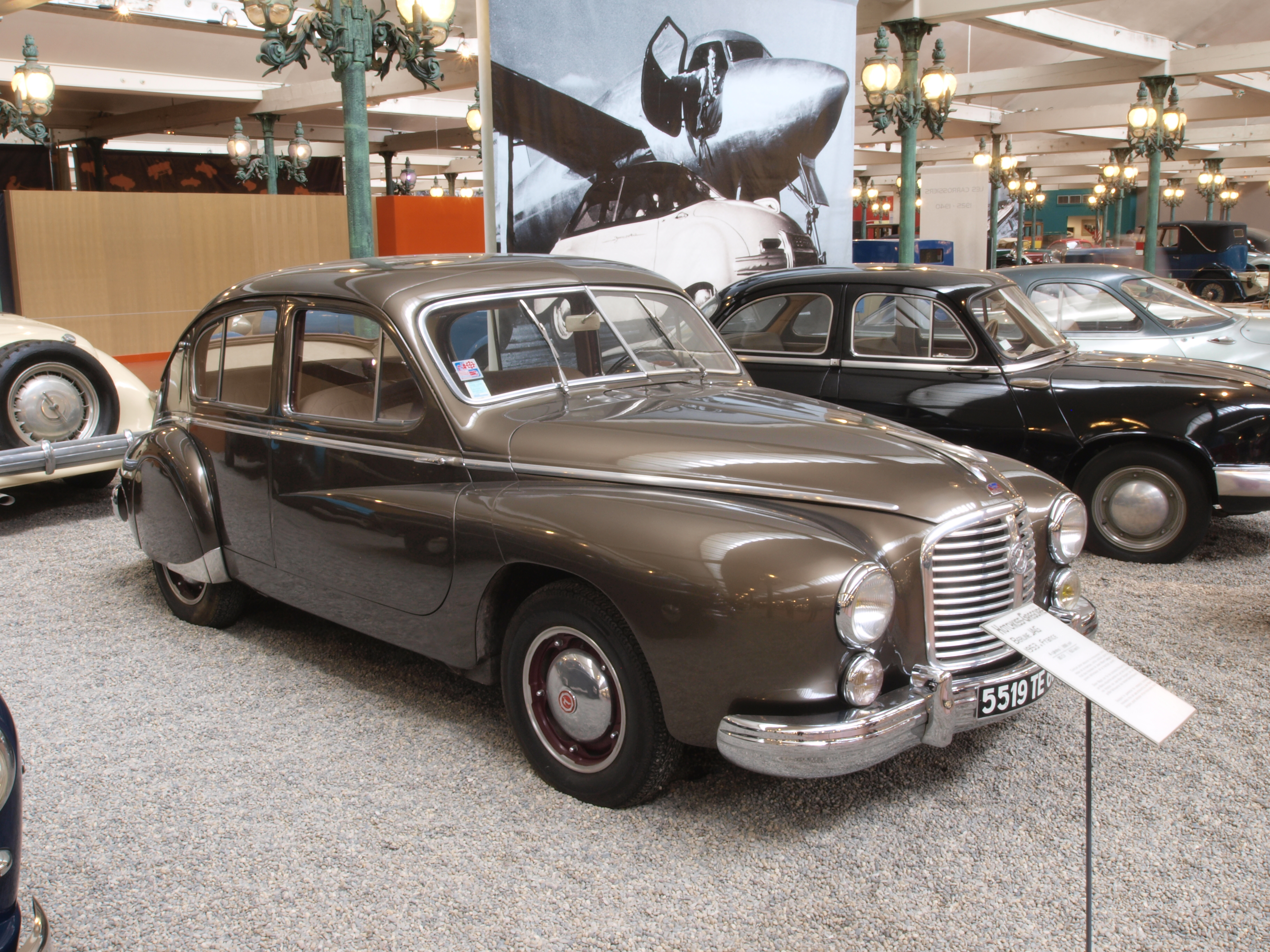

Overview
- Manufacturer: Hotchkiss
- Production: 1950–1953; 247 produced

Body and chassis
- Class: luxury saloon
- Body style: 4-door sedan
- Layout: FF layout

Powertrain
- Engine: 2180 cc H4

Dimensions
- Wheelbase: 2,500 mm (98.4 in)
- Length: 4,650 mm (183.1 in)
- Width: 1,700 mm (66.9 in)
- Height: 1,520 mm (59.8 in)

Chronology
- Predecessor: Hotchkiss Artois

The Grégoire is a luxury car produced from 1950 to 1954 by the French automaker Hotchkiss. Only about 247 were produced, with serial numbers 500 to 747.

The Grégoire was a modern-looking four-door saloon. Reportedly as a response to disappointing sales for the saloon, special-bodied coach-built coupé and cabriolet versions also appeared at the 1952 Paris Motor Show, including a streamlined Grégoire-based coupé with an eye-catching 'panoramic' rear window bodied by the coachbuilder Henri Chapron.

For more than thirty years, each new Hotchkiss had represented a gentle evolution from the previous model. With the Grégoire the company made a radical bid to create a new generation of cars. The car carried the name of its designer, Jean-Albert Grégoire, a man who had made his name in the 1930s as a car designer, with experience in designing front-wheel-drive cars, and a man who had spent much time during the war working on the application of aluminium to car production. Directly after the war, with European demand for war planes abruptly curtailed, the recently developed aluminium industry found opportunities in the more radical designs coming out of the automotive sector, and the Hotchkiss Grégoire was notable for its lightweight chassis, which incorporated much aluminium. The car also featured a new 2180 cc horizontal boxer water-cooled four-cylinder engine capable of delivering a claimed 70 or, from 1952, 75 HP. The flat-four engine permitted a low bonnet/hood line but was fitted well forward which enforced an extensive front overhang. The gear box was a four-speed unit with synchromesh on the upper three ratios and overdrive on the fourth.

The Grégoire’s commercial performance was affected by the company's 30-year record of producing worthy but conservative saloons. High development costs had to be amortised over the number of cars sold, and the low sales level led to a high retail price which, in turn, depressed sales further. By 1952 the Grégoire was retailing for twice the price of the similarly sized six-cylinder Citroën Traction 15CV. An additional challenge came from government taxation policies during the early 1950s in the French market, which heavily penalised larger cars. At the 1952 Paris Motor Show, it was obvious that several French luxury auto-makers like Delahaye clearly were in trouble. It was noted that for the Grégoire, despite its upmarket aspirations, the company was only able to distribute a very skimpy brochure, provided without any colour pictures. By 1953 output had slowed and only about 40 were produced, and by the time production ceased towards the end of that year, only 247 Hotchkiss Grégoires had been built; of these 235 had been four-door saloons.

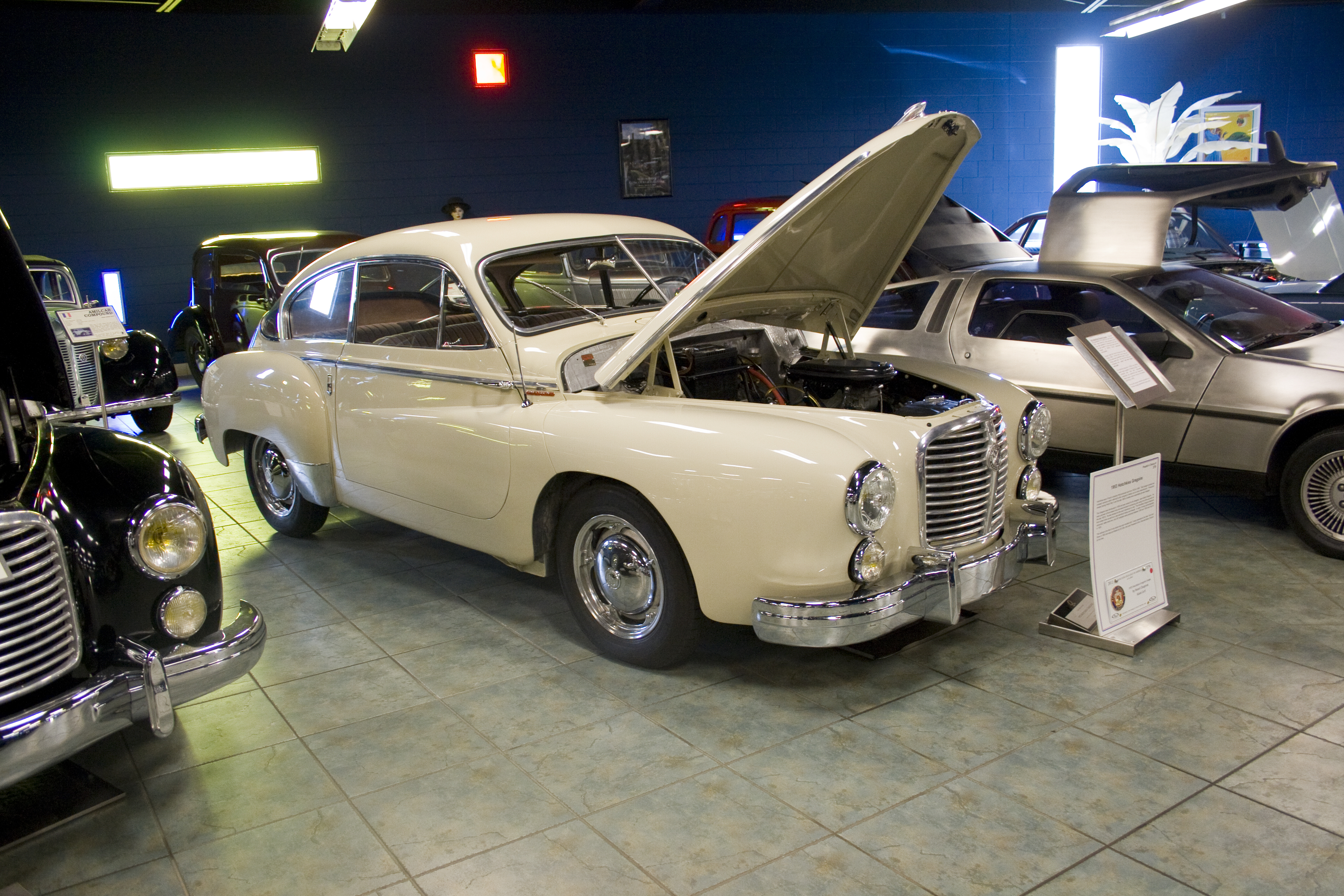
Hotchkiss Grégoire Coupé
