= VIASA =

VIASA may refer to:

- Venezolana Internacional de Aviación Sociedad Anónima, a defunct Venezuelan airline
- Vehículos Industriales y Agrícolas, S.A, a defunct Spanish automaker
