= Automobiles Hotchkiss =

Former French automobile marque

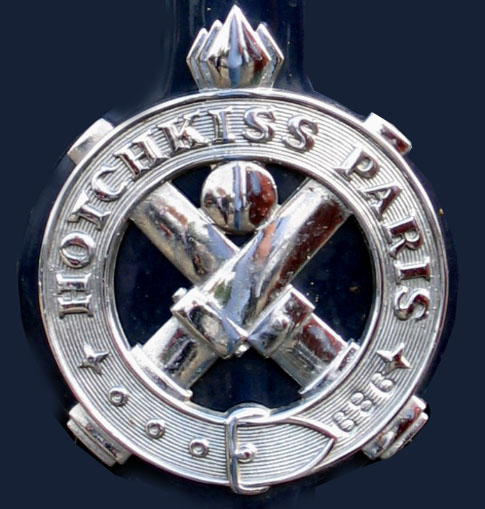
Hotchkiss logo on GS car.

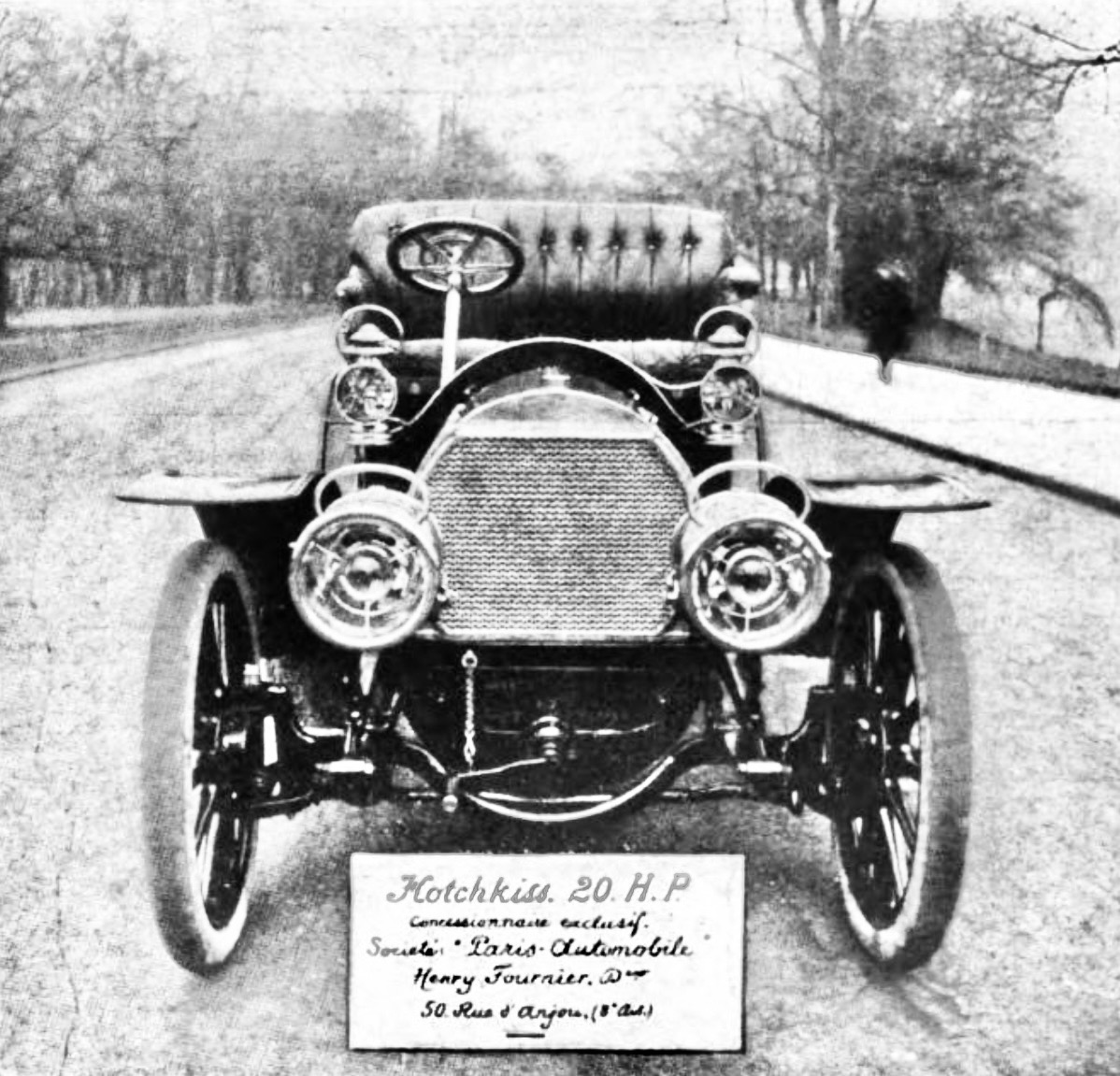
Hotchkiss 20 hp (1904)

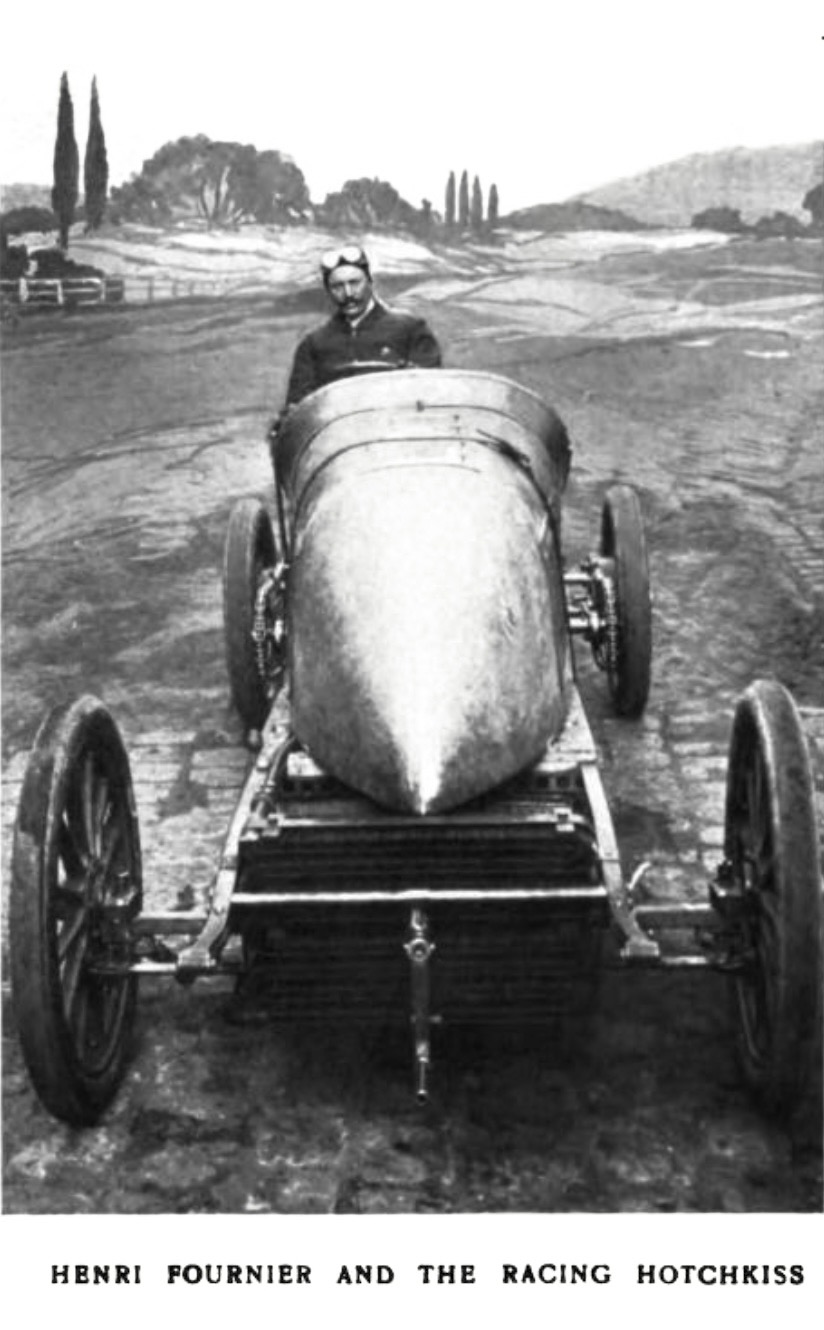
Hotchkiss racing car (1904)

Automobiles Hotchkiss was a subsidiary of the French company Hotchkiss et Cie based in Saint-Denis, Paris, which produced luxury cars between 1903 and 1955, and trucks between 1936 and 1970.

The badge for the marque showed a pair of crossed cannons, evoking the company's history as an arms manufacturer. Hotchkiss also briefly built cars under the Hotchkiss Grégoire brand after the war. Hotchkiss went through a number of mergers and takeovers after the war and the brand disappeared in the 1970s; its successor companies went on to eventually form the partially state-owned Thales Group.

== Early cars ==
The company's first entry into car making came from orders for engine components such as crankshafts which were supplied to Panhard et Levassor, De Dion-Bouton and other pioneering companies and in 1903 they went on to make complete engines. Encouraged by two major car distributors, Mann & Overton of London and Fournier of Paris, Hotchkiss decided to start making their own range of cars and purchased a Mercedes Simplex for inspiration. Georges Terasse, previously of Mors, was taken on as designer.

The first Hotchkiss car, a 17 CV four-cylinder model, appeared in 1903. The engine of the 20 CV type C was heavily based on the Mercedes Simplex except that wherever possible it used ball bearings rather than plain ones (including the crankshaft) and except the Hotchkiss drive. Six-cylinder models, the types L and O followed in 1907.

The ball bearing engines lasted until the 30CV type X of 1910. In that same year Hotchkiss moved into a smaller car market with the 2212cc type Z.

With the outbreak of World War I, the factory turned to war production and a subsidiary plant was opened in Coventry, England. Car production resumed in France 1919 with the pre war types AD, AD6, AF and AG. During World War I, they produced machine guns and tested them from the factory roof.

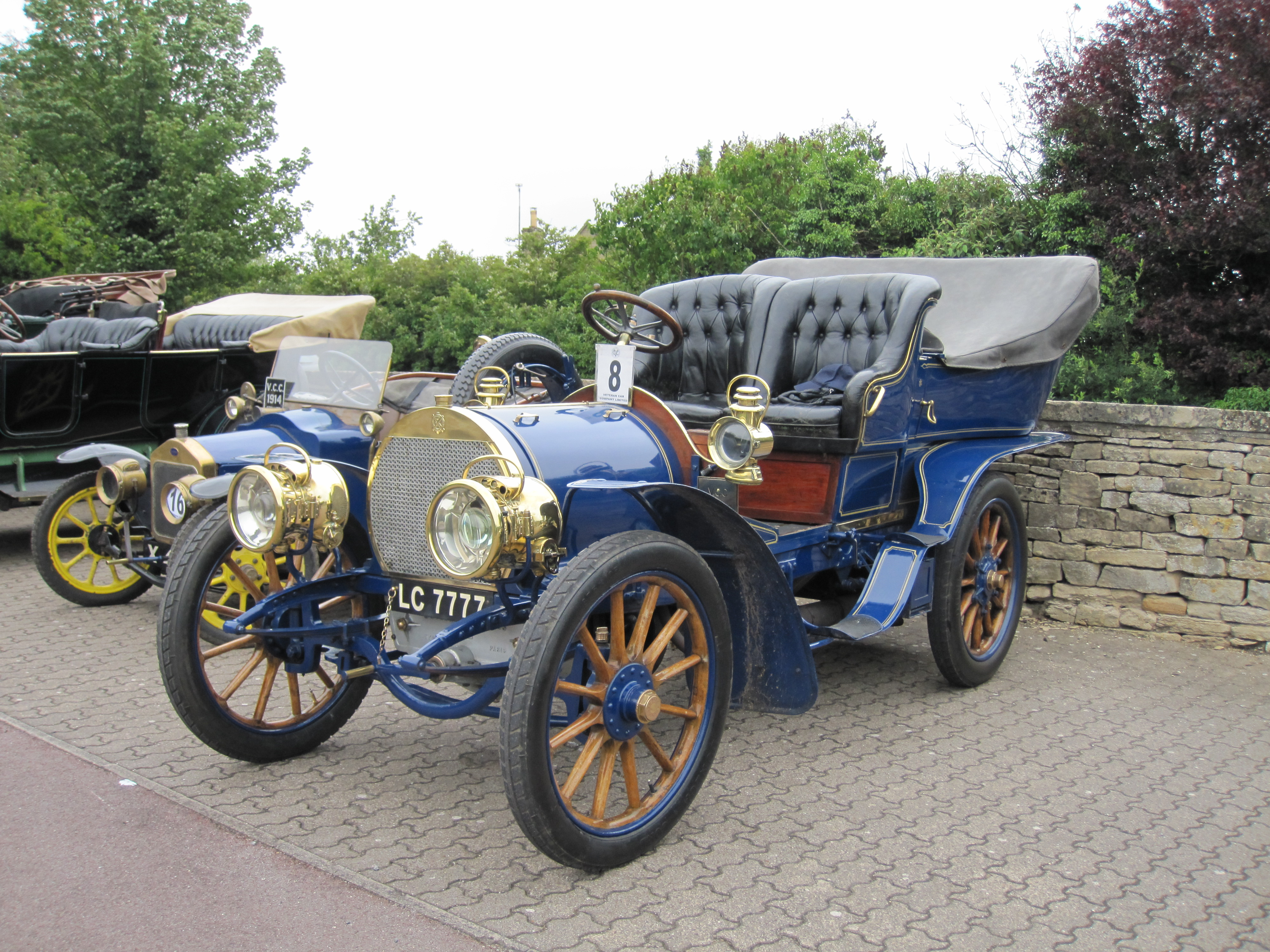
1904 Hotchkiss 20CV

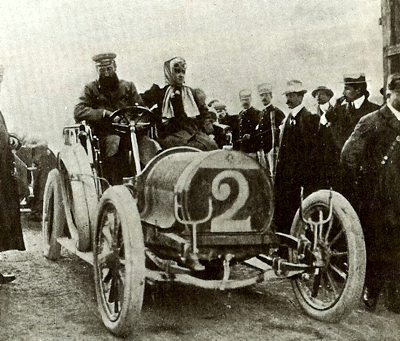
Hubert and Mme Le Blon at the 1906 Targa Florio, driving a Hotchkiss 35 hp

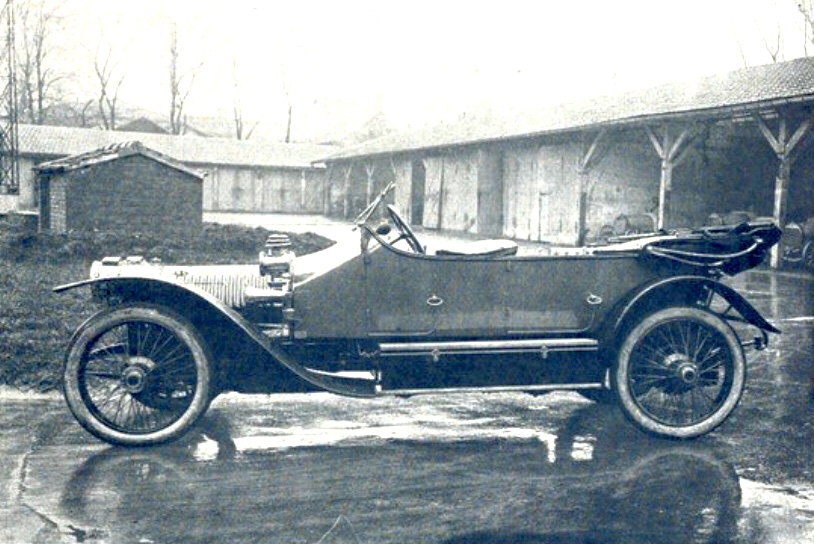
1912 Hotchkiss 12-16CV

== Production models ==
- Hotchkiss 35 CV
- Hotchkiss 20/30 CV
- Hotchkiss L

== Inter war production ==
After an attempt to enter the luxury market with the AK, which did not get beyond the prototype stage, the company decided on a one model policy and introduced the Coventry designed AM in 1923. Later that year the Coventry plant was sold to Morris. Henry Mann Ainsworth (1884–1971) and Alfred Herbert Wilde (1889 - 1930), who had run it, moved to Paris to become general manager and chief engineer of the car division respectively.

In 1926 construction of the new factory in the Boulevard Ornano was completed and in 1929 Hotchkiss got hold of a steel press allowing in-house manufacture of steel bodies. The one model policy lasted until 1929 when the six-cylinder AM73 and AM80 models were announced. "73" and "80" stood for the bore of the engines used, a naming theme picked up again later in 1936 after a brief hiatus.

Although most cars had bodies that were factory built, Hotchkiss still was a luxury car brand, and so coachbuilder Veth and Sons built a small number of bodies for the AM80.

The AM models were replaced by a new range in 1933 with a new naming system. The 411 was an 11CV model with four-cylinder engine, the 413 a 13CV four and the 615, 617 and 620 were similar six-cylinder types. The 1936 686, which replaced the 620, was available as the high-performance Grand Sport and 1937 Paris-Nice with twin carburettors and these allowed Hotchkiss to win the Monte Carlo Rally in 1932, 1933, 1934, 1939, 1949 and 1950. The new naming scheme introduced in 1936 consisted of the number of cylinders, followed by the bore of the engine (in millimetres).

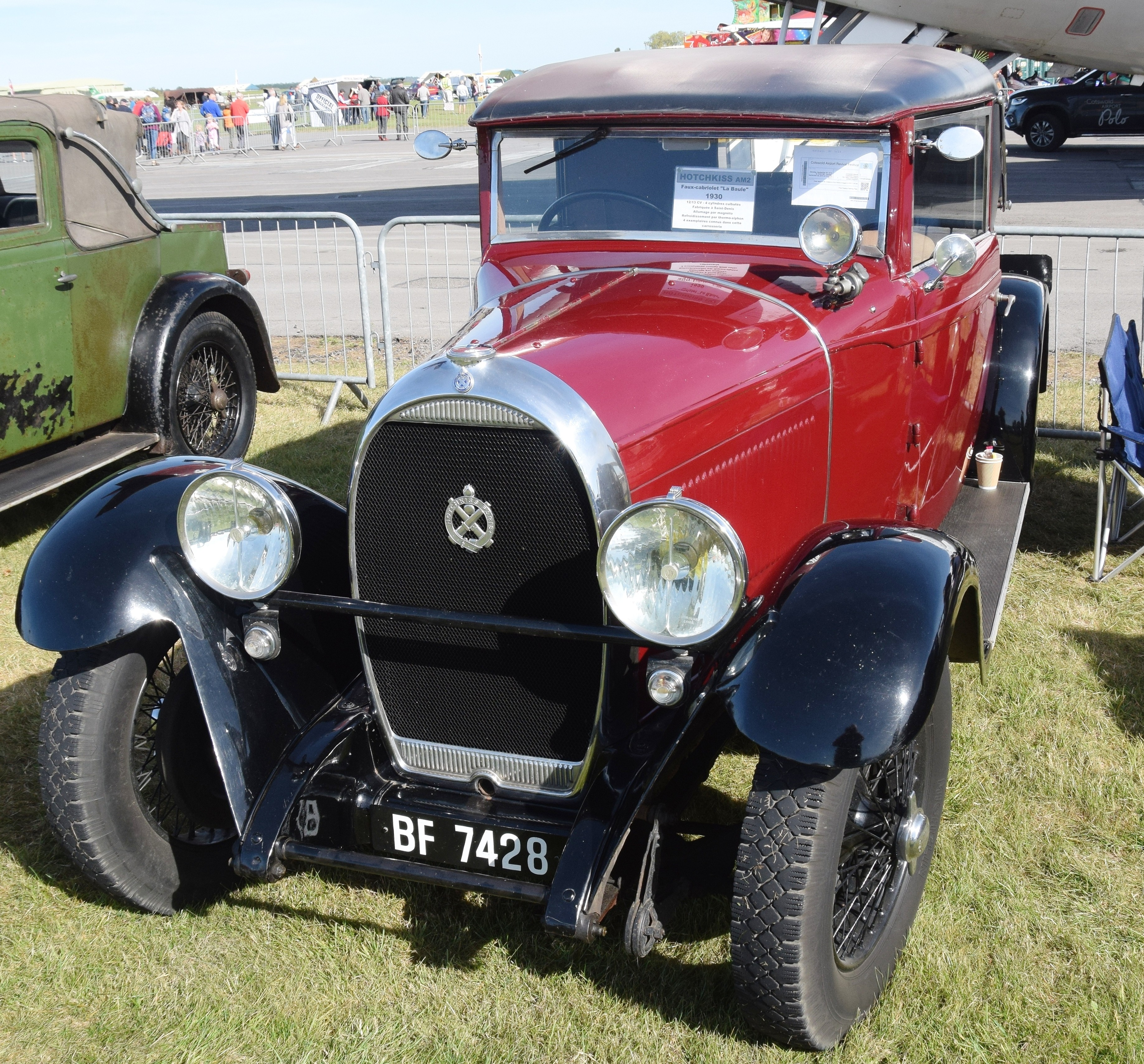
1930 Hotchkiss AM2 (produced from 1926-1932)

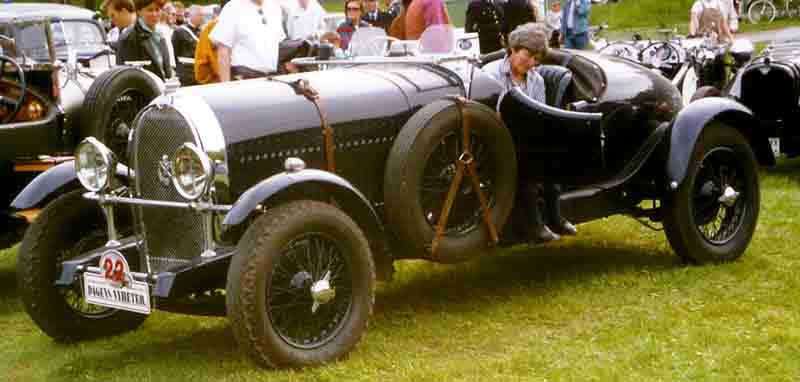
1931 Hotchkiss Sports

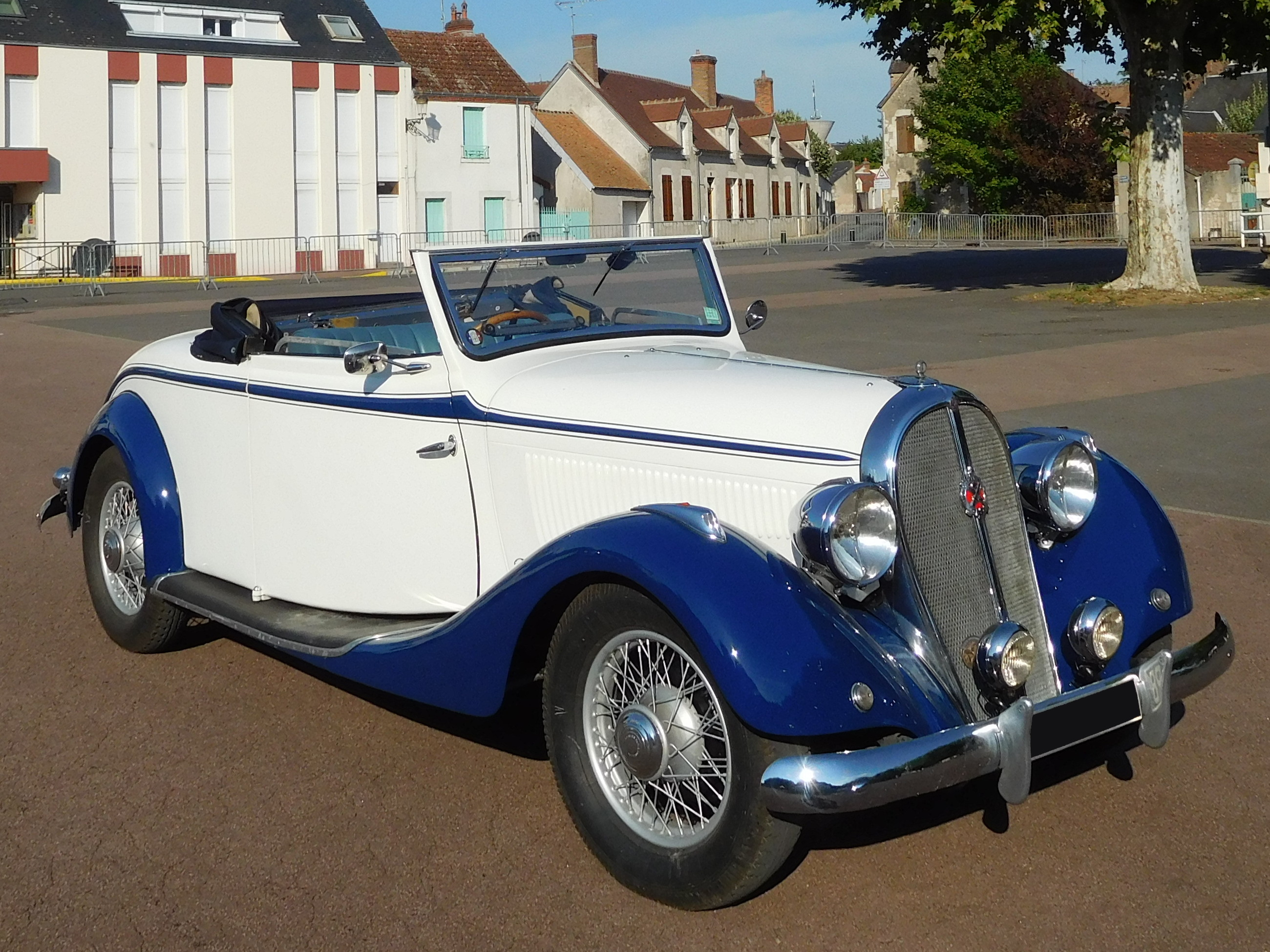
1935 Hotchkiss 617 Hossegor Décapotable

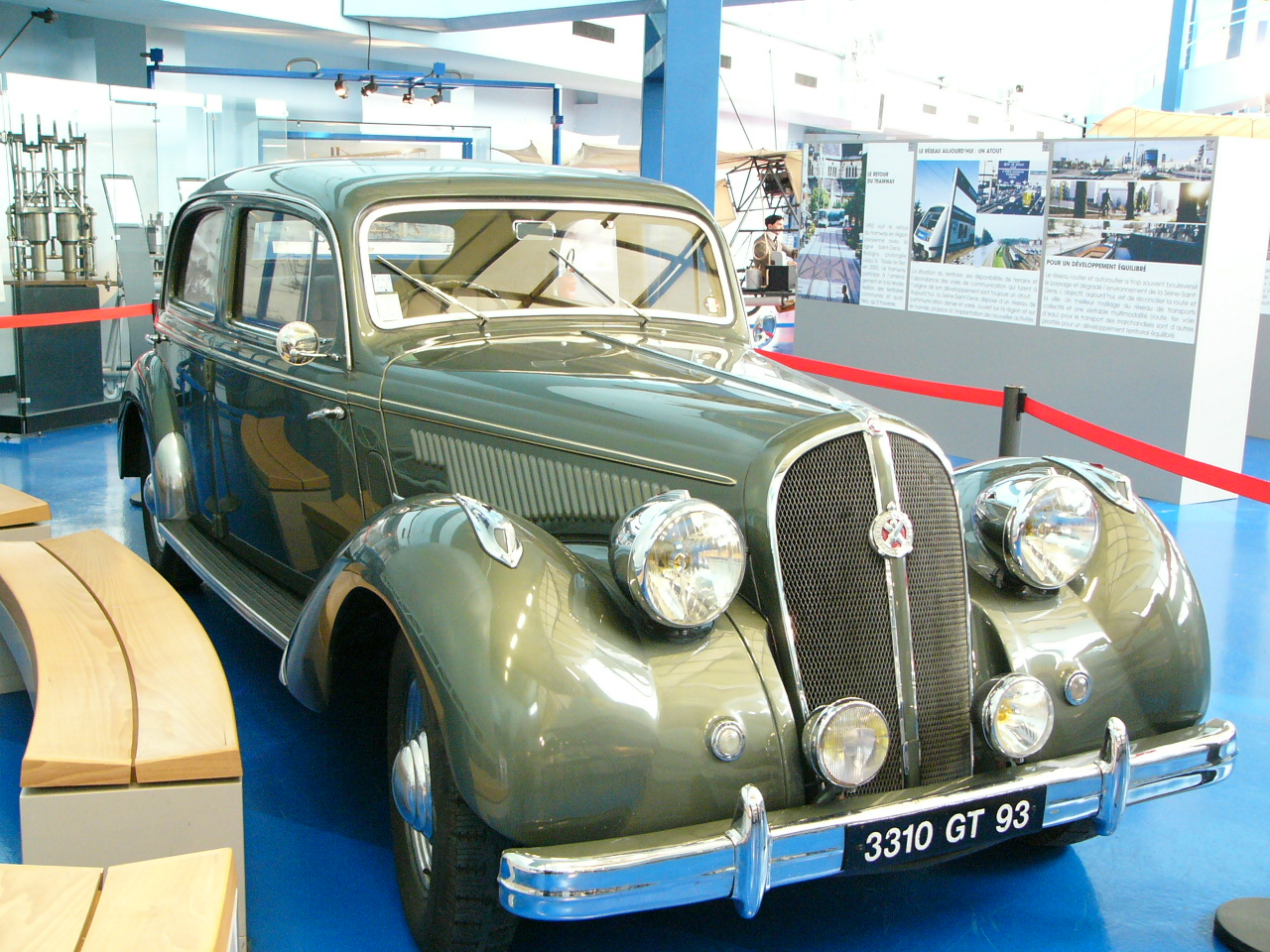
Hotchkiss 686 (produced from 1936 to 1952)

== Second World War ==
The armament side of the company and the body stamping plant were nationalised in 1936 by the Front Populaire government. The car company in 1937 took over Amilcar. With re-armament speeding up they also started making military vehicles and light tanks. When France declared war, in September 1939, Hotchkiss were sitting on an army order for 1,900 H35 and H39 tanks powered by six-cylinder motors of respectively 3.5 and 6 litres capacity, and at the time of the German invasion in May 1940 they were still working through the order. However, as the military situation deteriorated the decision was taken, on 20 May 1940, to abandon the Saint-Denis plant which by now was fully concentrated on war production. There was a disorderly evacuation, initially towards Auxerre and then Moulins and then further towards the south, as employees desperately tried to keep information on the military production out of the hands of the Germans. However, the national capitulation implicit in the signing of the armistice on 22 June left these efforts looking somewhat irrelevant, and most of the employees drifted back in the ensuing weeks. Two exceptions were the Commercial Director, Jacques Jacobsen, and the English-born General Director, Henry Ainsworth, both of whom managed to avoid capture and to leave France. During the war, like many businesses in the occupied (northern) zone, the company was obliged to work for the occupiers and was engaged in the repair of military vehicles.

In 1941 François Lehideux, then a leading member of the government's economic team, called Jean-Pierre Peugeot and his General Director Maurice Jordan to a meeting, and invited them to study the possibility of taking a controlling share in the Hotchkiss business. The suggestion from Lehideux derived from a German law dated 18 October 1940 authorising the confiscation of businesses controlled by Jews. The Peugeot business itself had been operating, grudgingly, under overall German control since the summer of 1940. In any event, in July 1942 Peugeot took a controlling share in the Hotchkiss business, and towards the end of 1942 the names of Peugeot and Jordan were listed as members of the Hotchkiss board. There is no evidence of any attempt to combine the operations of the two businesses, however: after the war Peugeot would in due course relinquish their holding in Hotchkiss.

With liberation in 1944, Ainsworth returned, and production restarted in 1946 with the pre-war cars, a light truck and a tractor.

== Post war models ==
After the war, car production resumed only slowly with fewer than 100 cars produced in each of 1946 and 1947, but by 1948 things were moving a little more rapidly with 460 Hotchkiss cars produced that year. This volume of output was wholly insufficient to carry the company, although truck production was a little more successful with more than 2,300 produced in 1948, and it was support from the truck volumes and from the Jeep based M201 that enabled the company to stagger on as a car producer slightly more convincingly than some of France's other luxury car makers, at least until the mid-1950s. The cars that represented the business in the second half of the 1940s were essentially the company's prewar designs. The 2,312 cc four-cylinder car was now branded as the Hotchkiss 864 while the six-cylinder car was badged as the Hotchkiss 680 with a 3,016 cc engine or as the Hotchkiss 686 with the 3,485 cc engine.

The luxury automobile range was modernised in 1950 and a new car, the four-door saloon Anjou, was available on the 1350 (renamed from the 486) and 2050 (686) chassis. The high-end Anthéor cabriolet was added in 1952. Some Anthéor and Anjou models were coachbuilt by Swiss coachbuilder Worblaufen, including two four-door Cabriolets.

In 1948 Hotchkiss had bought the rights to the Grégoire front-wheel-drive car and the resulting Hotchkiss Grégoire entered production in 1951 but it was very expensive - coming in at more than twice the cost of a Citroën 15/6, Hotchkiss still lost money on every car sold. Sales in general were falling, and on reaching his 65th birthday in 1949 Ainsworth retired, to be succeeded in the top job by Maurice de Gary. The Peugeot family sold their interest in the company. Coupé and cabriolet versions of the Hotchkiss Grégoire were announced in 1951; handmade by Chapron these were considerably more expensive. Sales and profitability did not improve, and production stopped in 1952 after only 247 had been made, including seven each of the two-door models.

Hotchkiss had made 2,700 cars in 1951. The Grégoire design had integral construction, independent suspension all round, a 2.2 Litre flat-four engine and front wheel drive. Claimed top speed was 95 mph. Buyers did not welcome its smooth shape nor the high price. Endless teething troubles brought production to a complete standstill in 1952. Hotchkiss produced 230 cars of all their models in 1953. In 1955 Citroën introduced the DS19 and Peugeot its 403. Aside from the Grégoire design, Hotchkiss could only offer pre-war designs. Export sales were limited by the failure to provide left-hand-drive cars. One of Hotchkiss' last public acts was displaying a Jeep Wagoneer at the 1969 Paris Salon, with an eye towards assembling it in France, but Hotchkiss had already sold their Stains plant and nothing came of this.

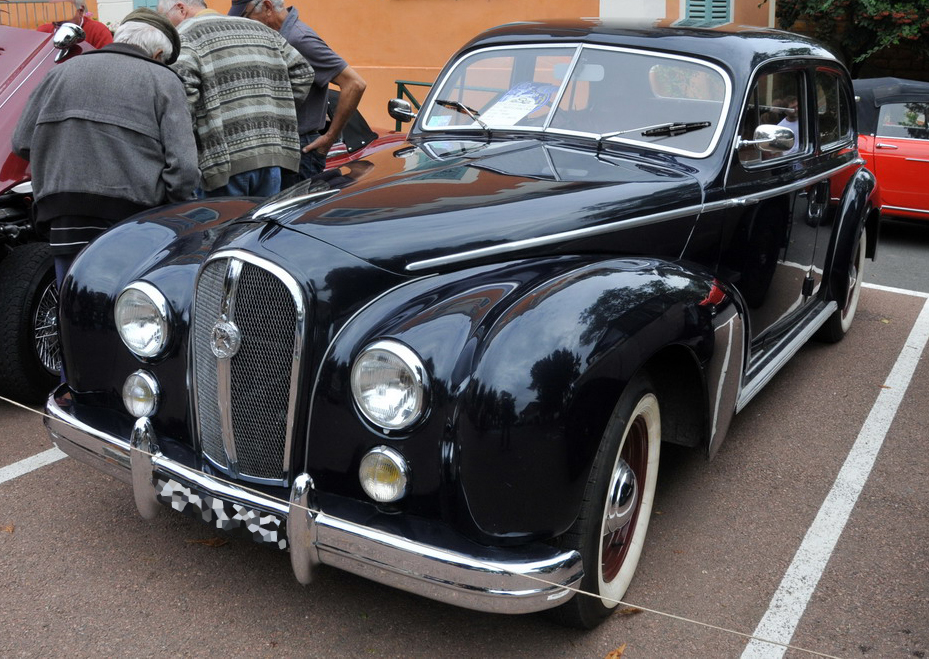
1955 Hotchkiss Anjou

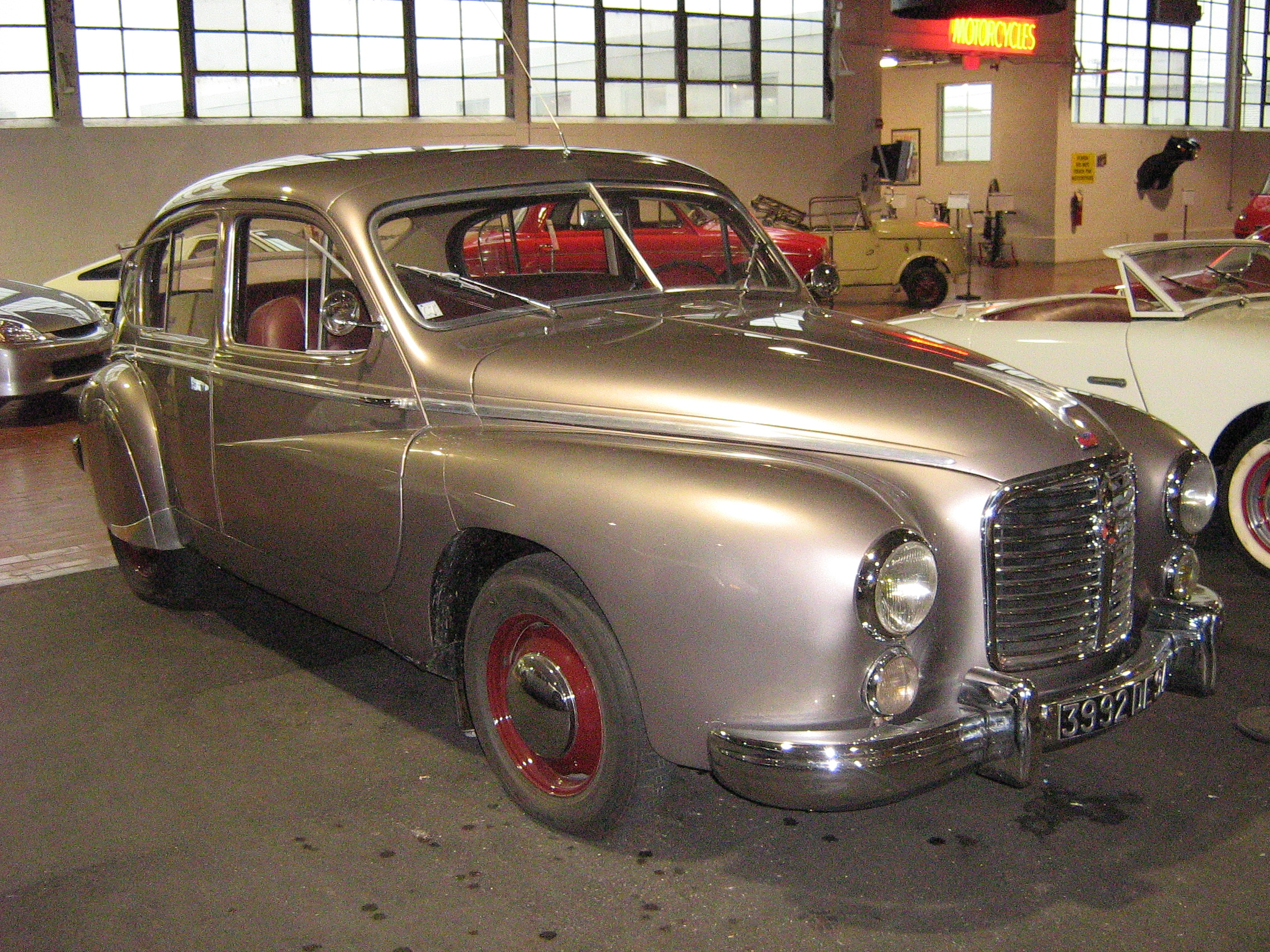
Hotchkiss Grégoire

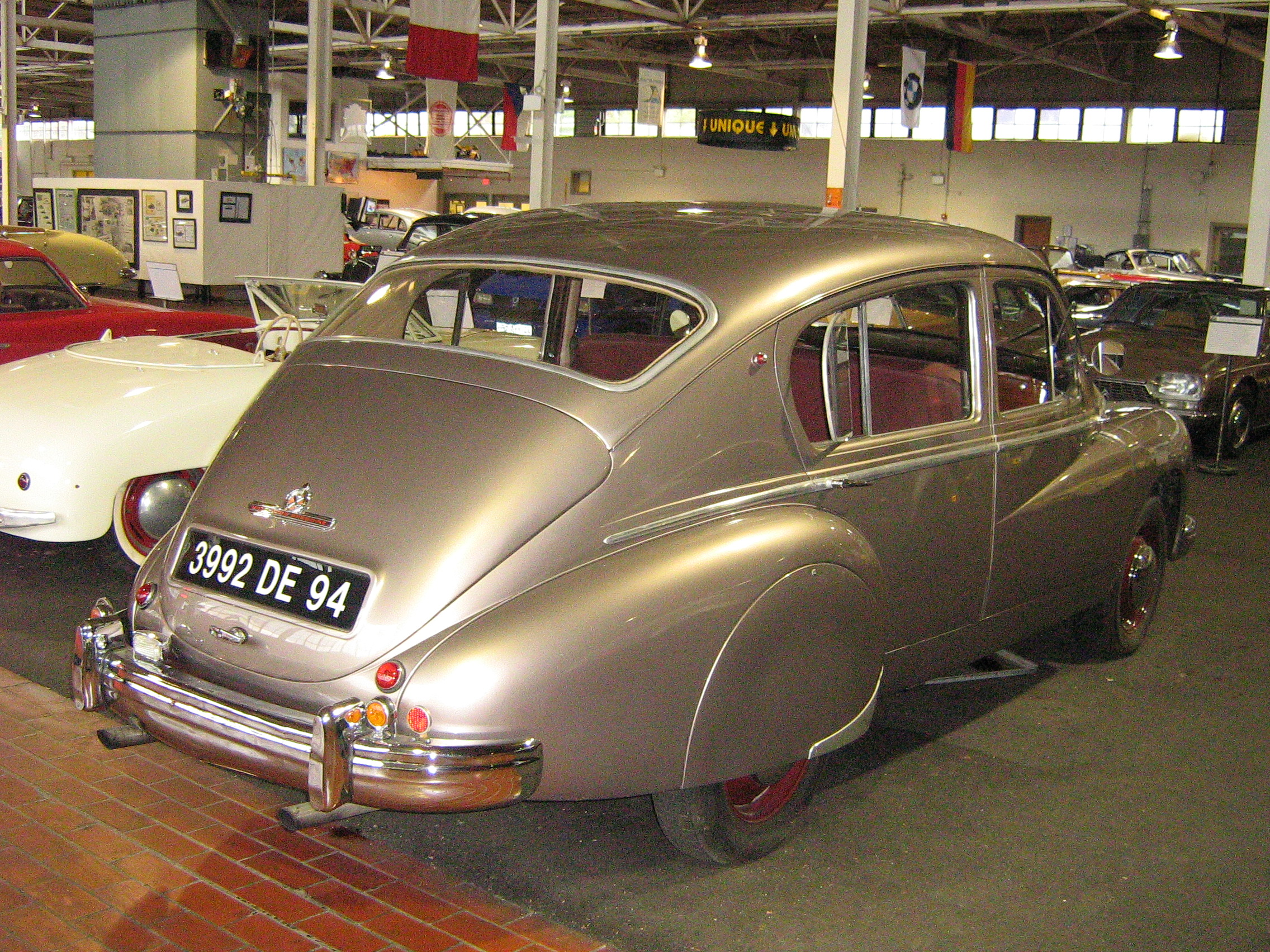
Rear view of Hotchkiss Grégoire

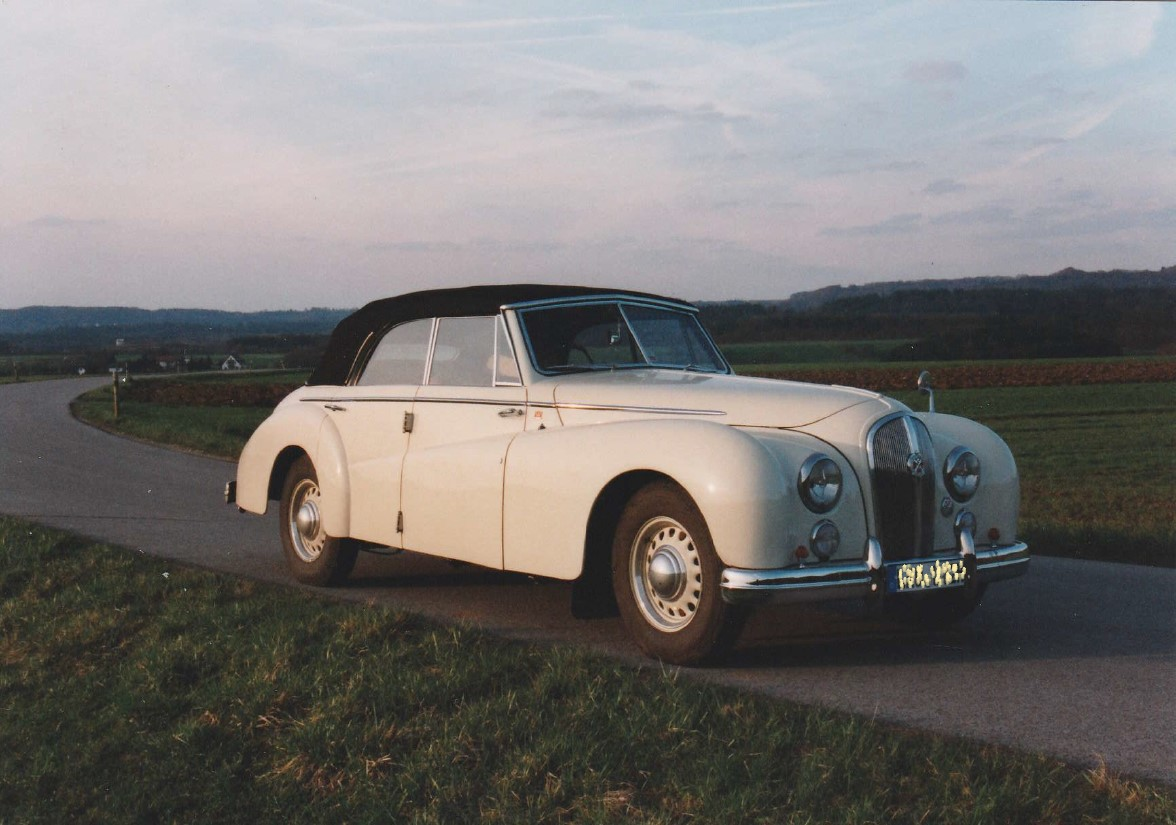
1951 Hotchkiss 20/50 Anjou four-door Cabriolet by Worblaufen

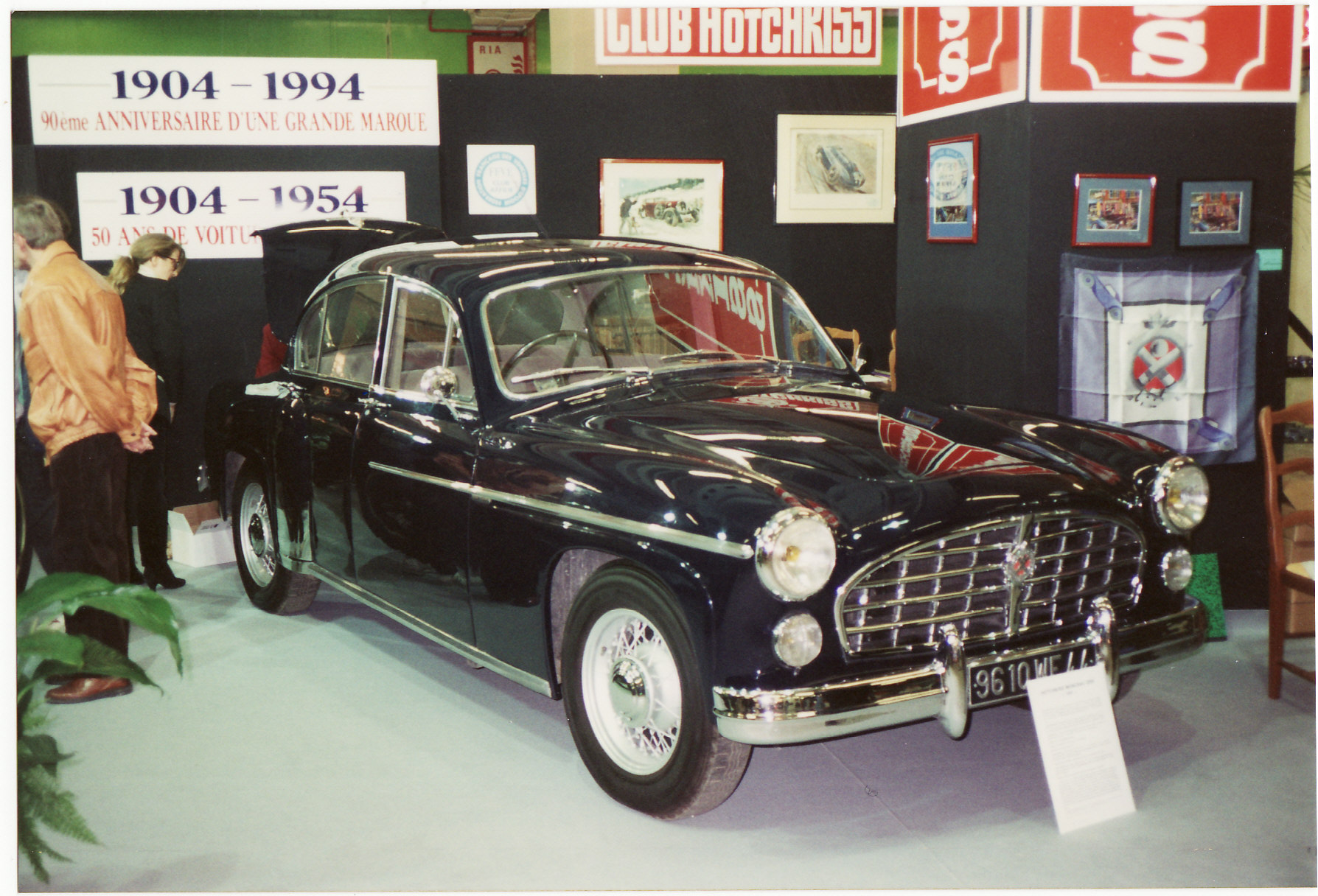
The 1954 Hotchkiss Monceau never entered regular production

== Trucks ==
Hotchkiss built its first truck in 1936, equipped with the 2,312 cc overhead-valve four-cylinder engine familiar from the 486 passenger car. Called the 486 PL (PLL in the case of the long wheelbase model), 163 examples had been built by the time production was halted in June 1940 due to the outbreak of war. After the war, this was updated with an all-steel cab in 1946, becoming the PL20, for two tonnes' payload. The 2.3-liter four-cylinder engine was retained, producing 60 hp (44 kW) at 3,000 rpm; this successful model also benefitted from hydraulic brakes. Hotchkiss trucks were all right-hand drive until March 1951, when this was changed to the more typical location on the left. In 1952 the payload was increased to 2.5 t (2.8 short tons) and the name was accordingly changed to PL25. The PL25 retained the PL20's 3.3 m (130 in) wheelbase. The range was supplemented by the six-cylinder PL26 in June 1952 and the longer, 3.8-metre (150 in) wheelbase PL25L in January 1953. The PL25 was kept in production until 1964.

The heavier, 5.5 t (6.1 short tons) PL50 was introduced in 1956, replacing the PL25. The new range was updated with new front fenders, incorporating the headlights. At first, the facelifted model used the rounded grille from the PL20, but once the existing stock of parts were used up, the PL50 switched to a flatter grille. The six-cylinder models (PL50-6) used Hotchkiss' 3.5-liter six, producing 90 hp (66 kW), and were frequently used as fire trucks. Most of the range used the same 2.3-liter four, producing 62 hp (46 kW) - this later increased to 65 hp (48 kW) and then 70 hp (51 kW) by 1962. The first diesel-engined Hotchkiss truck was the PL50D (and DL with the long wheelbase); this was fitted with a severely underpowered, dieselized derivative of the 2.3-liter four; as it was unreliable as well, most users swapped for Perkins engines and Hotchkiss themselves soon followed suit. The more powerful DH50 used a 3,153 cc (192.4 cu in) four-cylinder engine from Perkins (whose French plant was also in Saint-Denis), the 4.192, producing 60 hp (44 kW). From about 1964 there was also a 6 t (6.6 short tons) version, called the PL55/DH55.

French offroad specialists Herwaythorn S.A. also offered a four-wheel-drive conversion of the PL/DH. This was fitted with the Dunlop Pneuride air suspension front and rear, with the air bellows placed at the end of quarter-elliptic leaf springs which acted as radius arms.

In 1951, Hotchkiss formed a joint venture with the Standard Motor Company to manufacture the Ferguson TE20 tractor in the Saint-Denis plant. Between 1953 and 1957, Standard-Hotchkiss built over 37,000 TE20 tractors there, nicknamed Petit Gris ("Little Grey") in France. In January 1957, the model reached full local parts content and was accordingly renamed the FF-30, for "Ferguson France, 30 horsepower". FF-30 production ended in 1958, after nearly 29,000 had been built. Standard was also in negotiations for purchasing the Hotchkiss plant outright, with an eye to building the Triumph Herald in Paris, but the deal fell through. Massey-Ferguson chose to build a new plant in Beauvais, north of Paris, for their next generation of tractors, and thus the Standard connection came to an end.

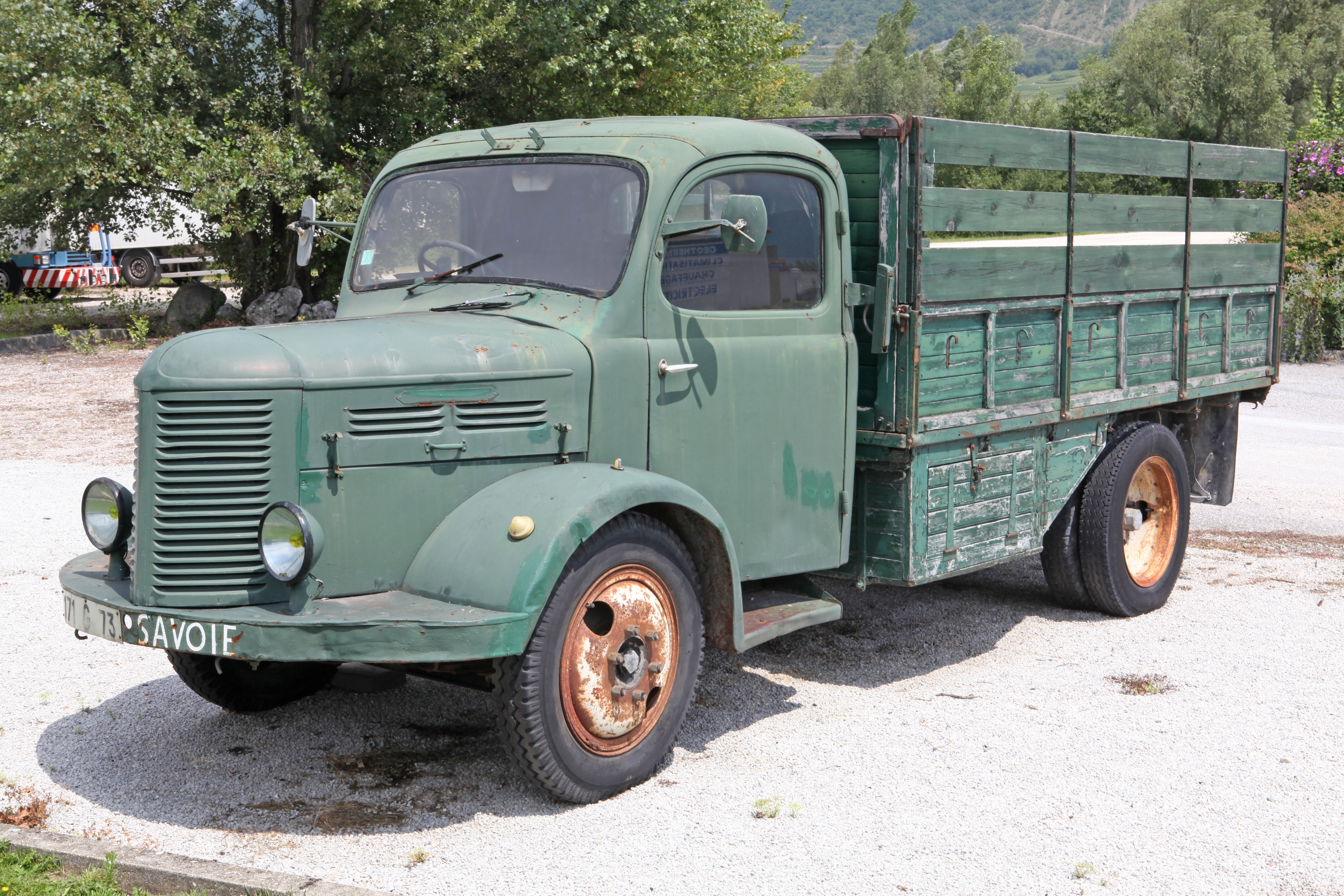
Hotchkiss PL20

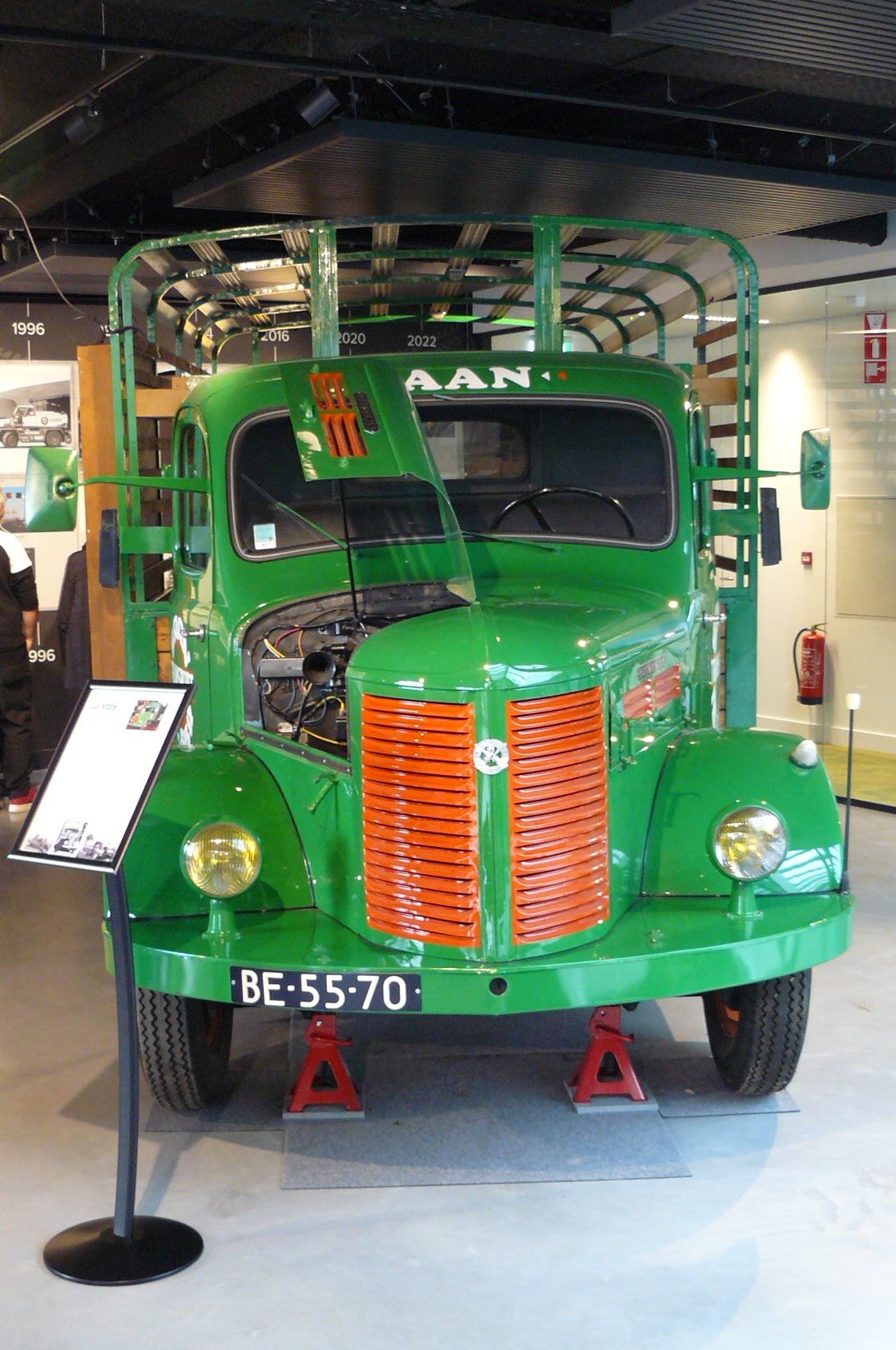
The PL25 (here a 1955 PL25L) differed from the earlier PL20 by having slightly smaller headlamps, mounted further back and more apart

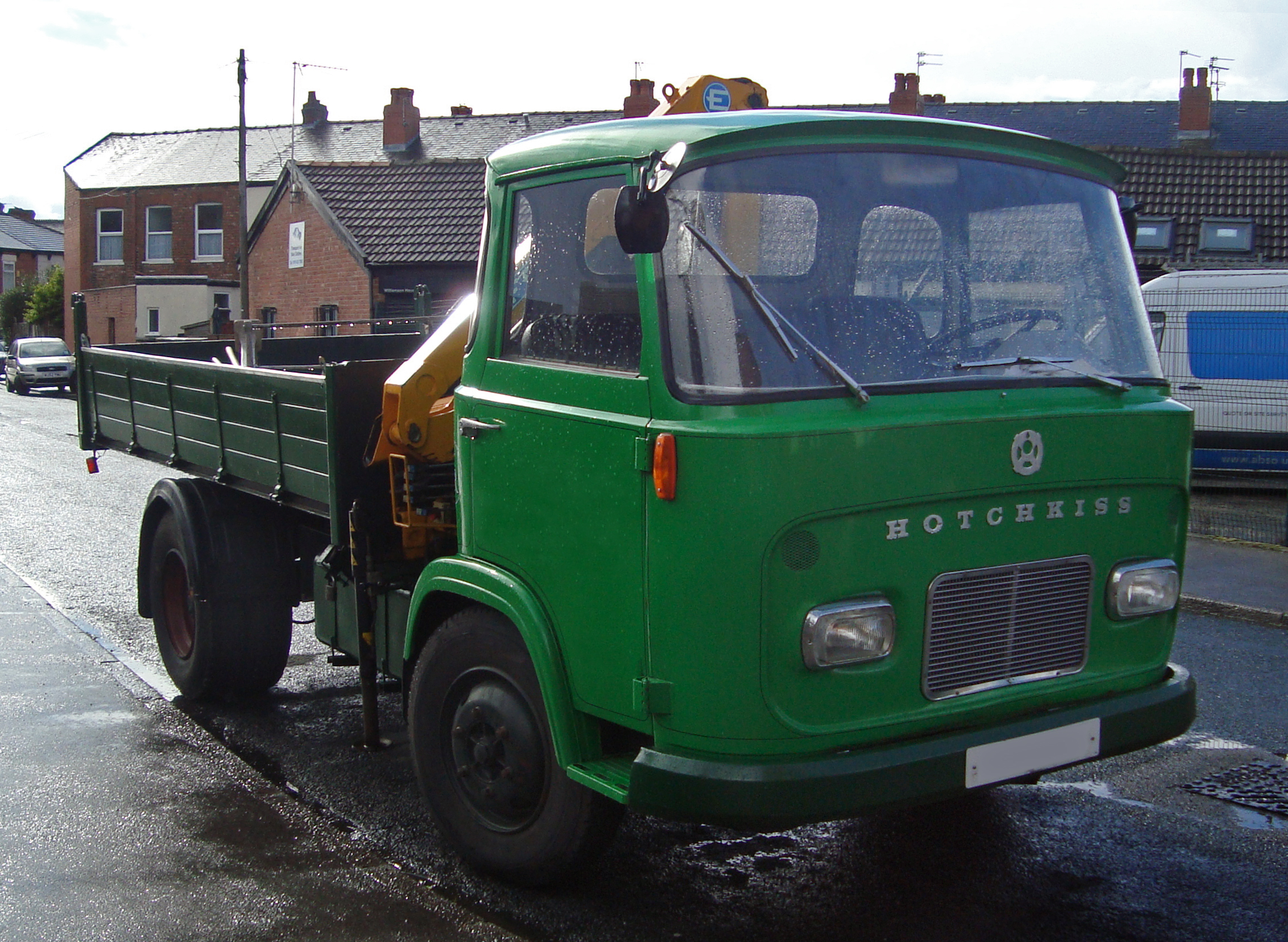
1968 Hotchkiss DH80, from the tilt cab series built between 1964 and 1970

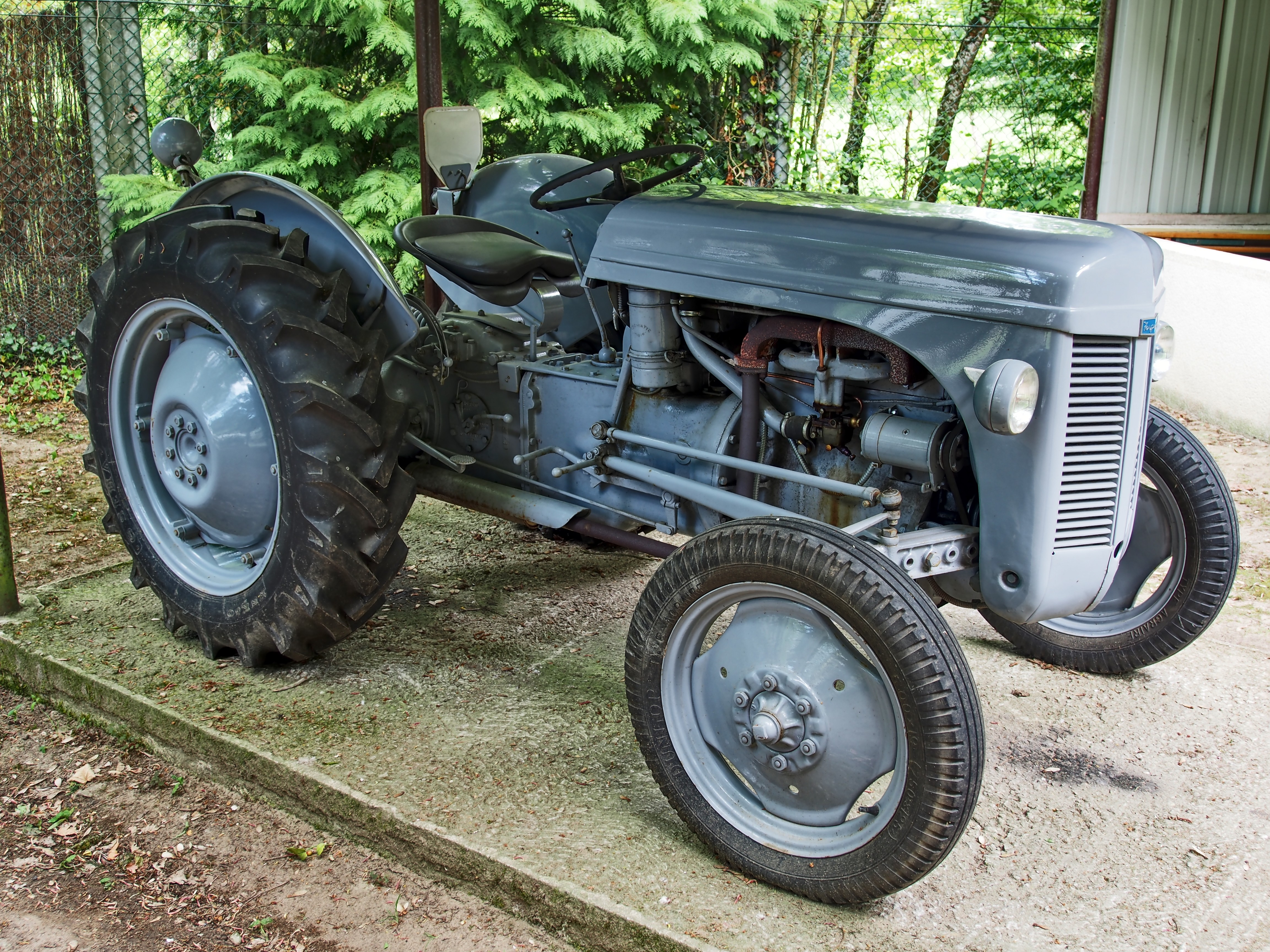
Hotchkiss-built Ferguson TEA 20 (1954)

== Merger and closure ==
Hotchkiss took over Delahaye, another French luxury car brand, in July 1954. The company immediately discontinued passenger car production under the Delahaye brand, and the last Hotchkiss passenger car was built the next year. The resulting Société Hotchkiss-Delahaye briefly built trucks under the combined brand but soon retired the Delahaye name, while replacing production of the Delahaye VLR Jeep with the Hotchkiss M201, a license-built version of the Willys MB which was manufactured until 1966. In 1956 the company was taken over by weapons and home goods manufacturer Brandt, becoming Hotchkiss-Brandt. This firm then merged with CFTH in 1966, becoming the "Compagnie française Thomson-Houston-Hotchkiss-Brandt" which was soon thereafter renamed Thomson-Houston. In 1968, this company was merged with CSF, becoming Thomson-CSF. The Hotchkiss name disappeared in the 1970s as truck manufacturing ended at the end of 1970 and was gone completely when the later Europa Jeep project was cancelled in 1976. Thomson-CSF, however, did keep using Hothkiss' crossed cannon emblem on their military vehicles. Thomson-CSF was nationalized in 1982 to form Thomson SA, eventually becoming the Thales Group.

The plant in Stains was sold in 1969; the Jeep production tooling had already been transferred to Spanish Jeep subsidiary Viasa in a deal with Thomson-Houston-Hotchkiss-Brandt. Hotchkiss' independent activities were wound up on 31 December 1970. Civilian truck manufacture was halted, arms manufacture and the Hotchkiss P4R Crotale missile delivery vehicle were transferred to Brandt. The provision of spare parts for the M201 Jeep was picked up by Hotchkiss' erstwhile subsidiary Sofia ("(la Société Financière Industrie et Automobile"), while the petrol truck engine manufacturing line was transferred to Berliet.

== See also ==
- Delahaye
- Delage
- Talbot-Lago
