= Vehículos Industriales y Agrícolas, S.A =

Vehículos Industriales y Agrícolas, S.A. (or VIASA) was a Spanish automobile company, a division of parent company Construcciones y Auxiliares de Ferrocariles (CAF).

== History ==
The company was founded in Zaragoza in the late 1950s to build agricultural equipment and vehicles Willys Overland Jeeps under license from Kaiser-Willys. It was one of three companies specializing in the production of commercial vehicles, two of them, ENASA and AISA, were controlled by the Spanish government through the INI. The third was VIASA, a division of parent company Construcciones y Auxiliares de Ferrocariles (CAF) that built railway cars and locomotives. Production began in 1960, and soon local content of all components was achieved. After Hotchkiss stopped building the M201 Jeep under license in 1966, the tooling for it was transferred from France to Viasa in a deal with Thomson-Houston-Hotchkiss-Brandt. Vehicles used Perkins and Barreiros gasoline or diesel engines.

In the early 1960s, VIASA also manufactured FIAT models 211R, 411R, and 421R under license.

In 1963, forward control "SV" versions went on sale offering a range of models with sharp-edged bodies with straight sheet metal design to simplify manufacture. These were completely unique from any other Jeep-based vehicles anywhere in the world. All had the same advanced cockpit in pick-up, van, chassis cab, or duplex passenger cabin. This Spanish design utilized the versatility of the Jeep Forward Control platform with a more basic approach to further enhance the utility of the vehicles. They were available with the Willis Super Hurricane 226.2 cu in (3,707 cc) straight-six producing 105 hp (78 kW; 106 PS) and 190 lb⋅ft (258 N⋅m) of torque or a 3.0 L Perkins four-cylinder diesel producing 62 hp (46 kW; 63 PS) and 143 lb⋅ft (194 N⋅m) of torque. The Perkins diesel engine allowed them achieve almost 30 mpg_{‑US} (7.8 L/100 km; 36 mpg_{‑imp}) and to cruise at 100 kilometers per hour (approx 60 mph).

In 1968, VIASA merged with Material Móvil y Construcciones S.A. In 1974, it was absorbed by Motor Ibérica and placed under Ebro trucks. In the early eighties the Viasa vehicles disappeared from the Motor Ibérica catalog, to be replaced by the Nissan Vanette and Nissan Patrol.

== See also ==
- Jeep CJ
