= Paris Motor Show =

Biennial auto show

Coordinates: 48.8308°N 2.2867°E

Paris Motor Show Mondial de l'Automobile
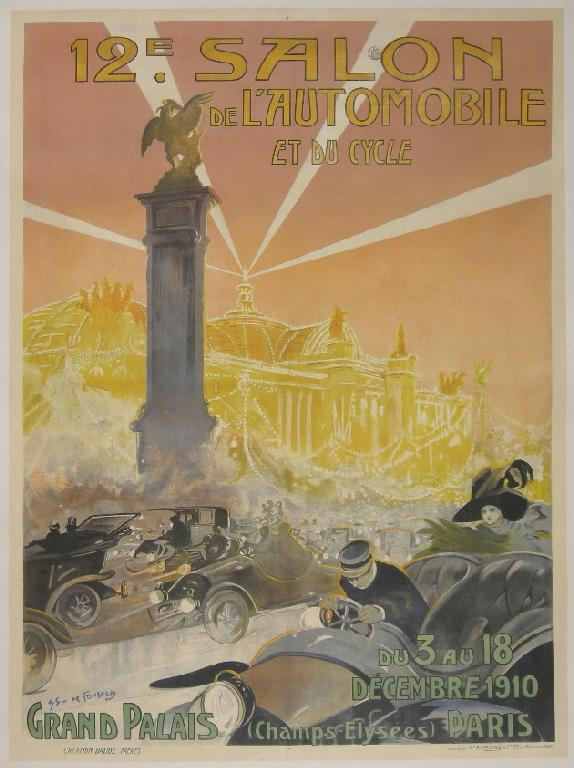
- 12e. Salon de l'Automobile et du Cycle (Gaston Simoes de Fonseca, 1910).
- Genre: Auto show
- Date: October
- Frequency: Biennial: Even years
- Location: Paris
- Country: France
- Inaugurated: 1898; 128 years ago
- Founder: Albert de Dion
- Most recent: 2026
- Next event: 2028
- Organiser: AMC Promotion
- Website: www.mondial-paris.com

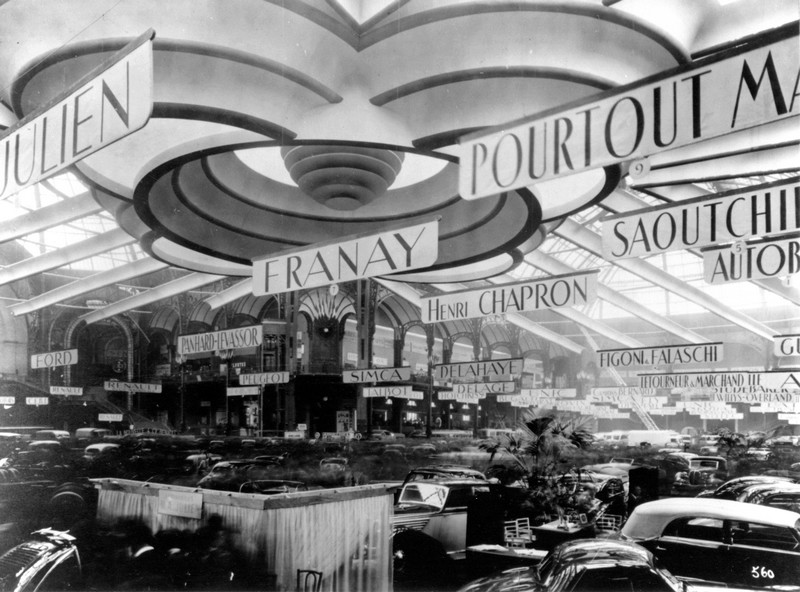
Salon de l'Automobile de Paris 1946

The Paris Motor Show (French: Mondial de l'Automobile) is a biennial auto show in Paris. Held during October, it is one of the most important auto shows, often with many new production automobile and concept car debuts. The show presently takes place in Paris expo Porte de Versailles. The Mondial is scheduled by the Organisation Internationale des Constructeurs d'Automobiles, which considers it a major international auto show.

In 2016, the Paris Motor Show welcomed 1,253,513 visitors, making it the most visited auto show in the world, ahead of Tokyo and Frankfurt.

The key figures of the show are: 125,000 m^{2} (1,350,000 ft^{2}) of exhibition, 8 pavilions, 260 brands from 18 countries, 65 world premieres, more than 10 000 test drives for electric and hybrid cars, more than 10 000 journalists from 103 countries. Until 1986, it was called the Salon de l'Automobile; it took the name Mondial de l'Automobile in 1988 and Mondial Paris Motor Show in 2018.

The show was held annually until 1976; since which time, it has been held biennially.

== History ==
The show was the first motor show in the world, started in 1898 by industry pioneer, Jules-Albert de Dion. After 1910, it was held at the Grand Palais in the Champs-Élysées. During the First World War motor shows were suspended, meaning that the show of October 1919 was only the 15th "Salon".

There was again no Paris Motor Show in 1925, the venue having been booked instead for an Exhibition of Decorative Arts. In October 1926, the Motor Show returned, this being the 26th Paris Salon de l'Automobile. The outbreak of war again intervened in 1939 when the 33rd Salon de l'Automobile was cancelled at short notice.

Normality of a sorts returned some six years later and the 33rd "Salon" finally opened in October 1946. In January 1977, it was announced that no Paris Motor Show would take place that year, because of the "current economic situation": at the same time the organisers confirmed that a 1978 Auto Salon for Paris was planned.

The 65th Salon de Paris duly opened on 15 October 1978 in the modern buildings of the Parc des Expositions, on the south western edge of central Paris at the Porte de Versailles, where the show had been held since 1962.

== Editions ==
- 1898 1st
- 1913 14th "Salon de l'Automobile"
- 1919 15th "Salon de l'Automobile" (Model Year 1920) The first "Salon" since 1913.

9 October 1919
65 French automobile makers exhibited (plus 22 French commercial vehicle manufacturers and 31 non-French automobile industry businesses). At least 118 exhibitors in total.

=== 1920s ===
There was no "Salon de l'Automobile" in 1920

- 1921 16th "Salon de l'Automobile" (Model Year 1922)
- 1922 17th "Salon de l'Automobile" (Model Year 1923)

4 October 1922
81 French automobile makers exhibited (plus one French commercial vehicle manufacturer, 7 "Coachbuilders" and 25 non-French automobile industry businesses.) 113 exhibitors in total.

- 1923 18th "Salon de l'Automobile" (Model Year 1924)
- 1924 19th "Salon de l'Automobile" (Model Year 1925)

2 October 1924
78 French automobile makers exhibited (plus four French commercial vehicle manufacturers and 34 non-French automobile industry businesses.) 116 exhibitors in total.

There was no "Salon de l'Automobile" in 1925 due to the venue having been allocated to an Exhibition of Decorative Arts

- 1926 20th "Salon de l'Automobile" (Model Year 1927)

7 October 1926
81 French automobile makers exhibited and 42 non-French automobile industry businesses exhibited. 126 exhibitors in total

- 1927 21st "Salon de l'Automobile" (Model Year 1928)
- 1928 22nd "Salon de l'Automobile" (Model Year 1929)
- 1929 23rd "Salon de l'Automobile" (Model Year 1930)

=== 1930s ===
- 1930 24th "Salon de l'Automobile" (Model Year 1931)

2 October 1930
46 French automobile makers and 46 non-French automobile makers exhibited. 92 exhibitors in total.

- 1931 25th "Salon de l'Automobile" (Model Year 1932)

1 October 1931
39 French automobile makers and 37 non-French automobile makers exhibited. 79 exhibitors in total.

- 1932 26th "Salon de l'Automobile" (Model Year 1933)
- 1933 27th "Salon de l'Automobile" (Model Year 1934)

5 October 1933
26 French automobile makers exhibited.

- 1934 28th "Salon de l'Automobile" (Model Year 1935)

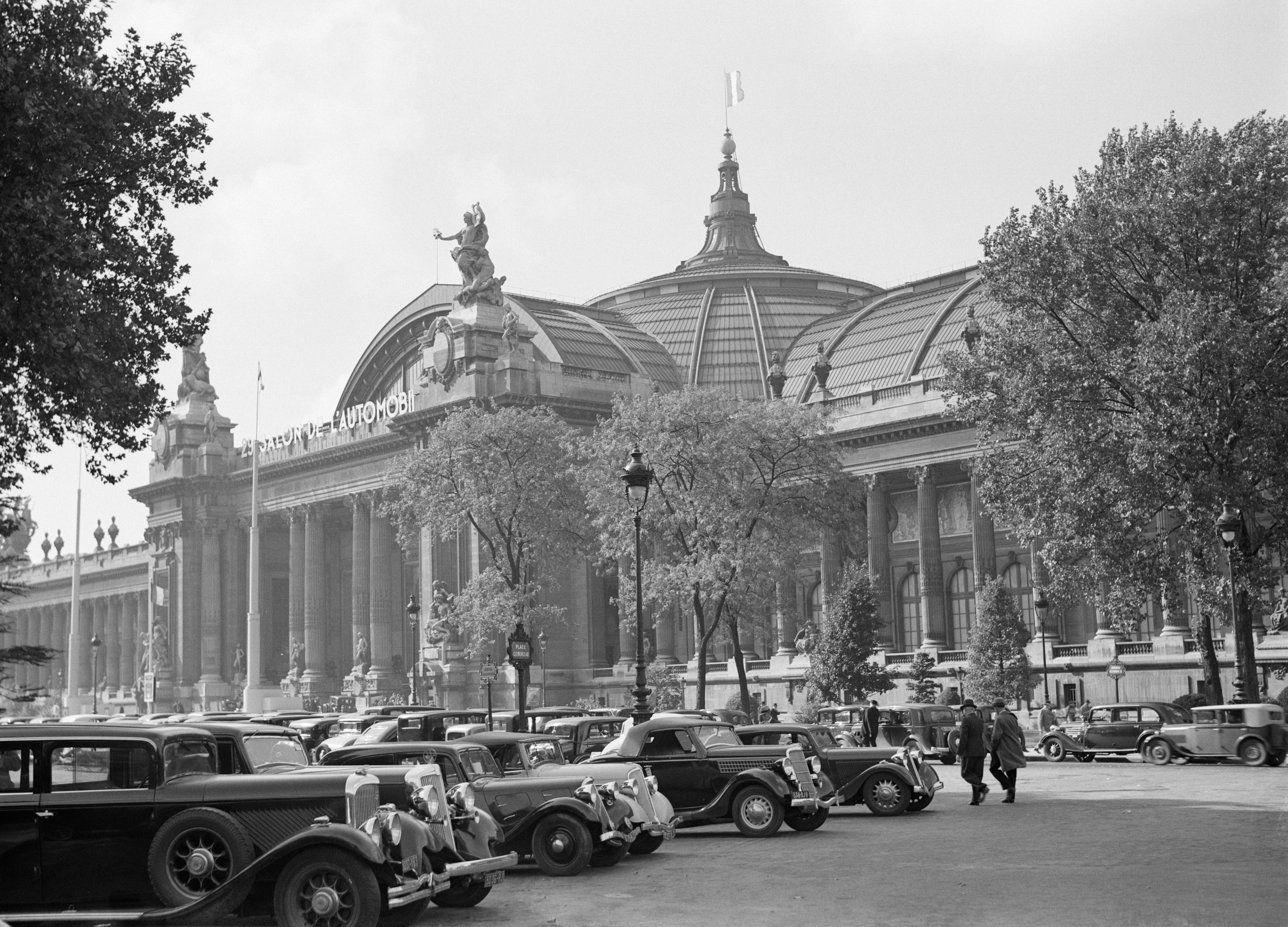
Salon de l'Automobile de Paris 1935

- 1935 29th "Salon de l'Automobile" (Model Year 1936)
- 1936 30th "Salon de l'Automobile" (Model Year 1937)
- 1937 31st "Salon de l'Automobile" (Model Year 1938)

7 October 1937
22 French automobile makers exhibited.

- 1938 32nd

=== 1940s ===
No shows were held from 1939 until 1945

- 1946 33rd
- 1947 34th "Salon de l'Automobile" (Model Year 1948)

23 October 1947
27 French automobile makers exhibited.

- 1948 35th
- 1949 36th

=== 1950s ===
- 1950 37th
- 1951 38th "Salon de l'Automobile" (Model Year 1952)

4 October 1951
23 French automobile makers exhibited.

- 1952 39th
- 1953 40th

Inter Autoscooter world premiere

- 1954 41st

Facel Vega world premiere

- 1955 42nd

Citroën DS world premiere
Alfa Romeo Giulietta Spider
Continental Mark II world premiere
VELAM Isetta

- 1956 43rd

Facel Vega Excellence world premiere

- 1957 44th "Salon de l'Automobile" (Model Year 1958)

3 October 1957
24 French automobile makers exhibited.

- 1958 45th
- 1959 46th

Facel Vega Facellia

=== 1960s ===
- 1960 47th

Panhard PL 17 Cabriolet
Triumph Italia

- 1961 48th "Salon de l'Automobile" (Model Year 1962)

5 October 1961
9 French automobile makers exhibited, plus one "Jeep" maker and one coachbuilder.

- 1962 49th Salon

This was the first year the show was held at the Porte de Versailles on the outskirts of Paris.

Buick Riviera world premiere

- 1963 50th
- 1964 51st
- 1965 52nd "Salon de l'Automobile" (Model Year 1966)

October 1965
9 French automobile makers exhibited, plus one "Jeep" maker and one coachbuilder.

- 1966 53rd
- 1967 54th "Salon de l'Automobile" (Model Year 1968)

6 October 1967
8 French automobile makers exhibited, plus one coachbuilder

Citroën Dyane world premiere

- 1968 55th "Salon de l'Automobile" (Model Year 1969)
- 1969 56th "Salon de l'Automobile" (Model Year 1970)

last year that Automobiles Hotchkiss exhibited

=== 1970s ===
- 1970 57th "Salon de l'Automobile" (Model Year 1971)

Berliem TR300

- 1974 61st "Salon de l'Automobile" (Model Year 1975)

Citroën CX world premiere
Porsche 911 Turbo world premiere

- 1976 63rd "Salon de l'Automobile" (Model Year 1977) known as a "Salon de Sobriété"

Ferrari 400 world premiere

- 1978 64th "Salon de l'Automobile" (Model Year 1979)

15 October 1978

=== 1980s ===
- 1988 73rd edition

=== 1990s ===
- 1992 75th edition

Introduction of the Renault Twingo

- 1998 Paris Motor Show

Introduction of the Audi TT
Renault Vel Satis concept

=== 2000s ===
- 2000 Paris Motor Show
- 2002 Paris Motor Show
- 2004 Paris Motor Show
- 2006 Paris Motor Show
- 2008 Paris Motor Show

=== 2010s ===
- 2010 Paris Motor Show
- 2012 Paris Motor Show
- 2014 Paris Motor Show
- 2016 Paris Motor Show

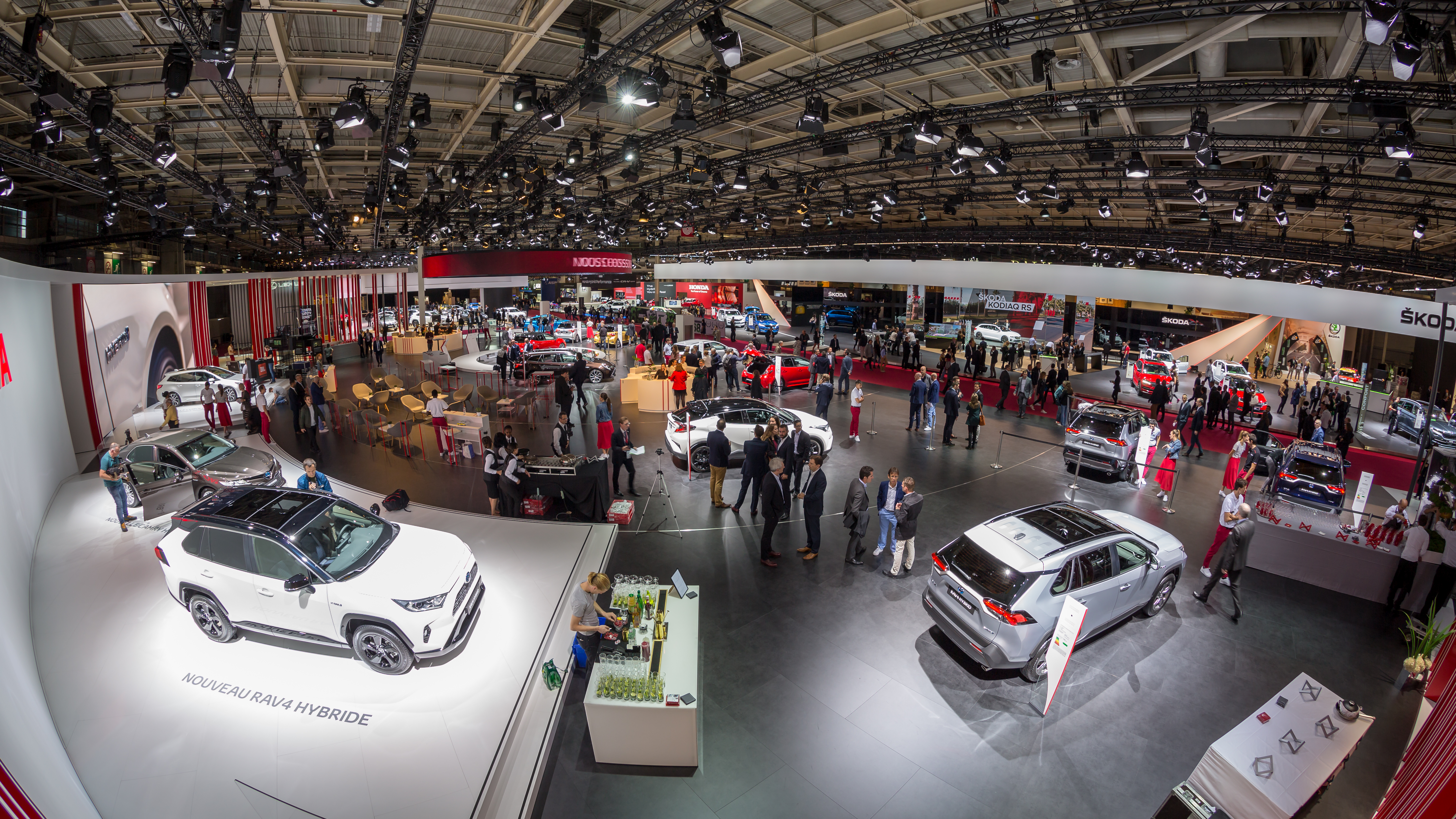
Toyota and Škoda stands during the edition of 2018

- 2018 Paris Motor Show

=== 2020s ===
There was no "Salon de l'Automobile" in 2020 due to the COVID-19 pandemic

- 2022 Paris Motor Show
- 2024 Paris Motor Show
- 2026 Paris Motor Show
