= Hotchkiss M201 =

Jeep Hotchkiss M201
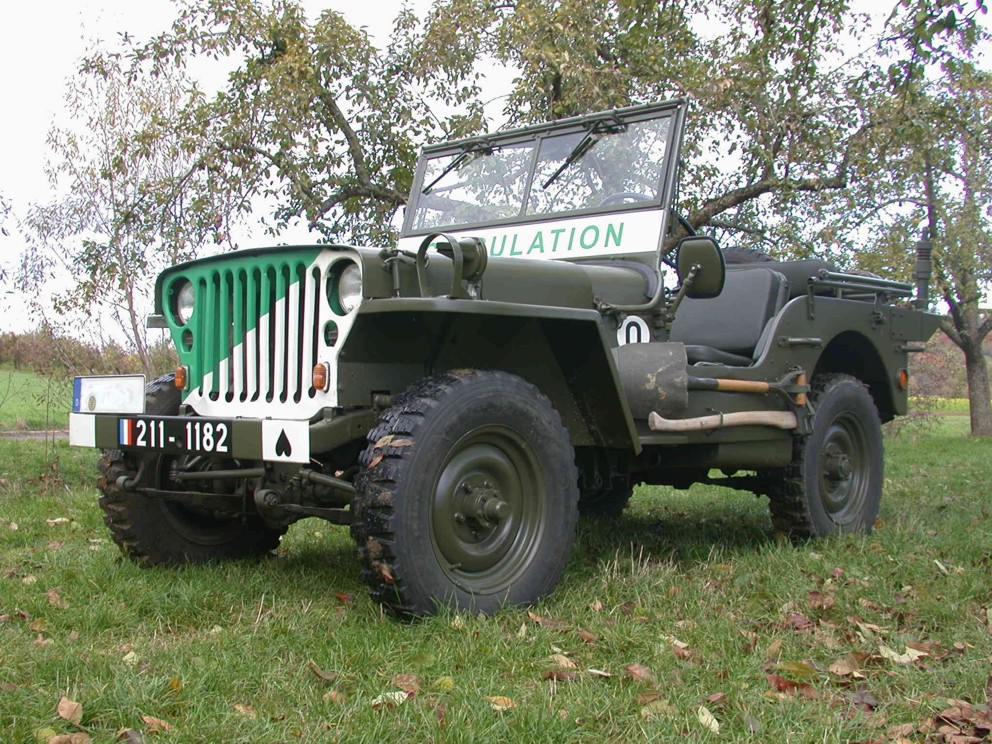

Overview
- Manufacturer: Hotchkiss
- Also called: Hotchkiss JH-101 (civilian version 1954-1960); Hotchkiss JH-102 (civilian version after 1960) "La Jeep"
- Production: 1955–1966

Body and chassis
- Class: Off-road vehicle
- Body style: Jeep
- Layout: Front engined Four-wheel drive

Powertrain
- Engine: 2199 cc I4

Dimensions
- Wheelbase: 2,030 mm (79.9 in)
- Length: 3,370 mm (132.7 in)
- Width: 1,480 mm (58.3 in)
- Height: 1,300 mm (51.2 in)
- Curb weight: 1,050 kg (2,310 lb) dry weight

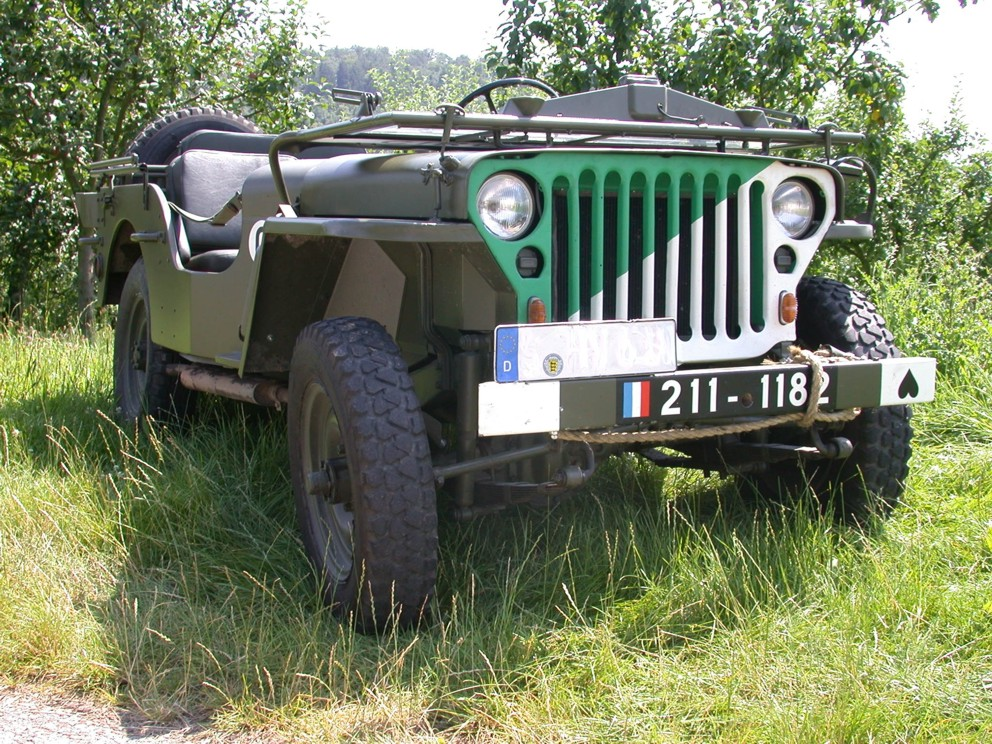
Hotchkiss M201 with windscreen folded

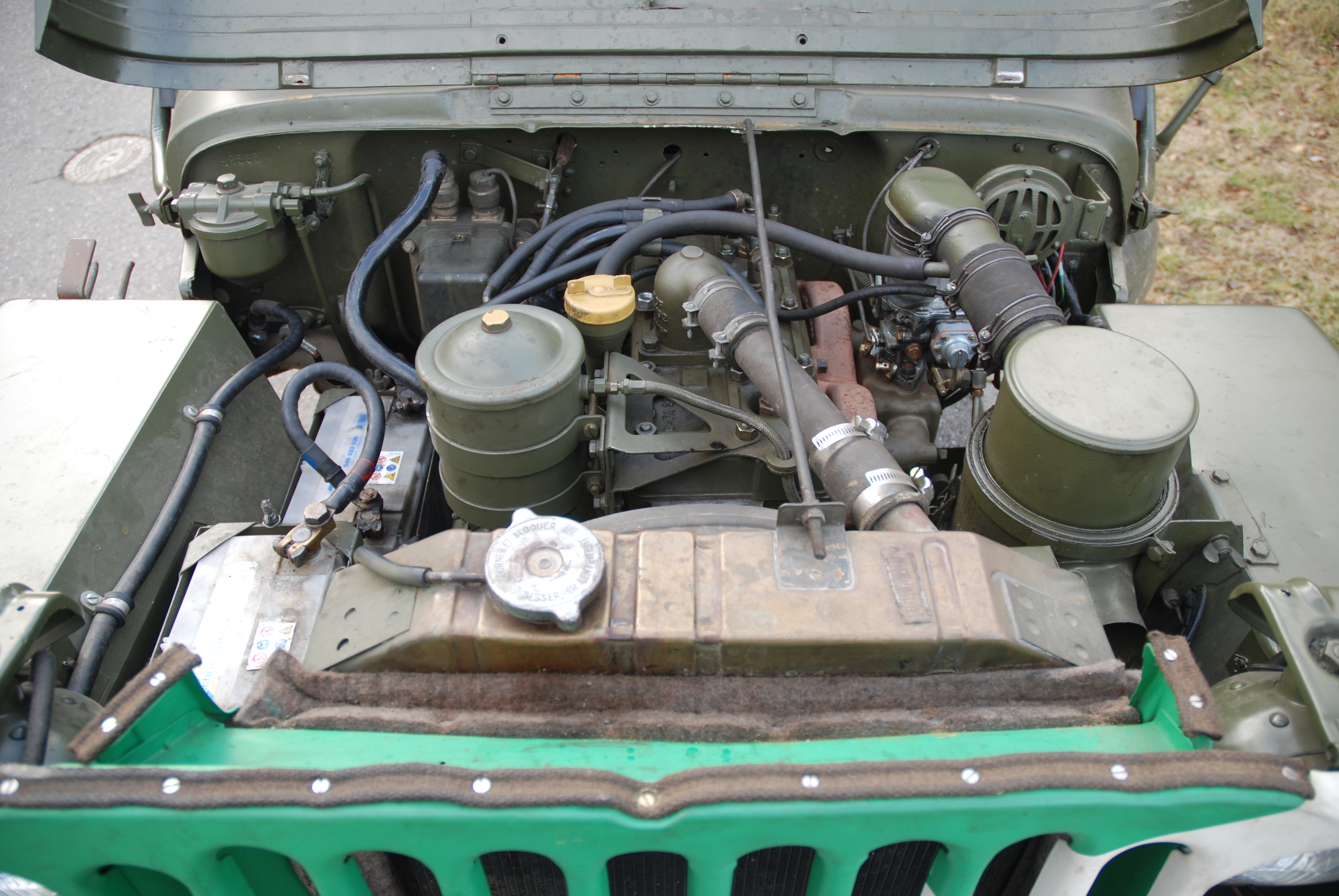
Engine of a Hotchkiss M201

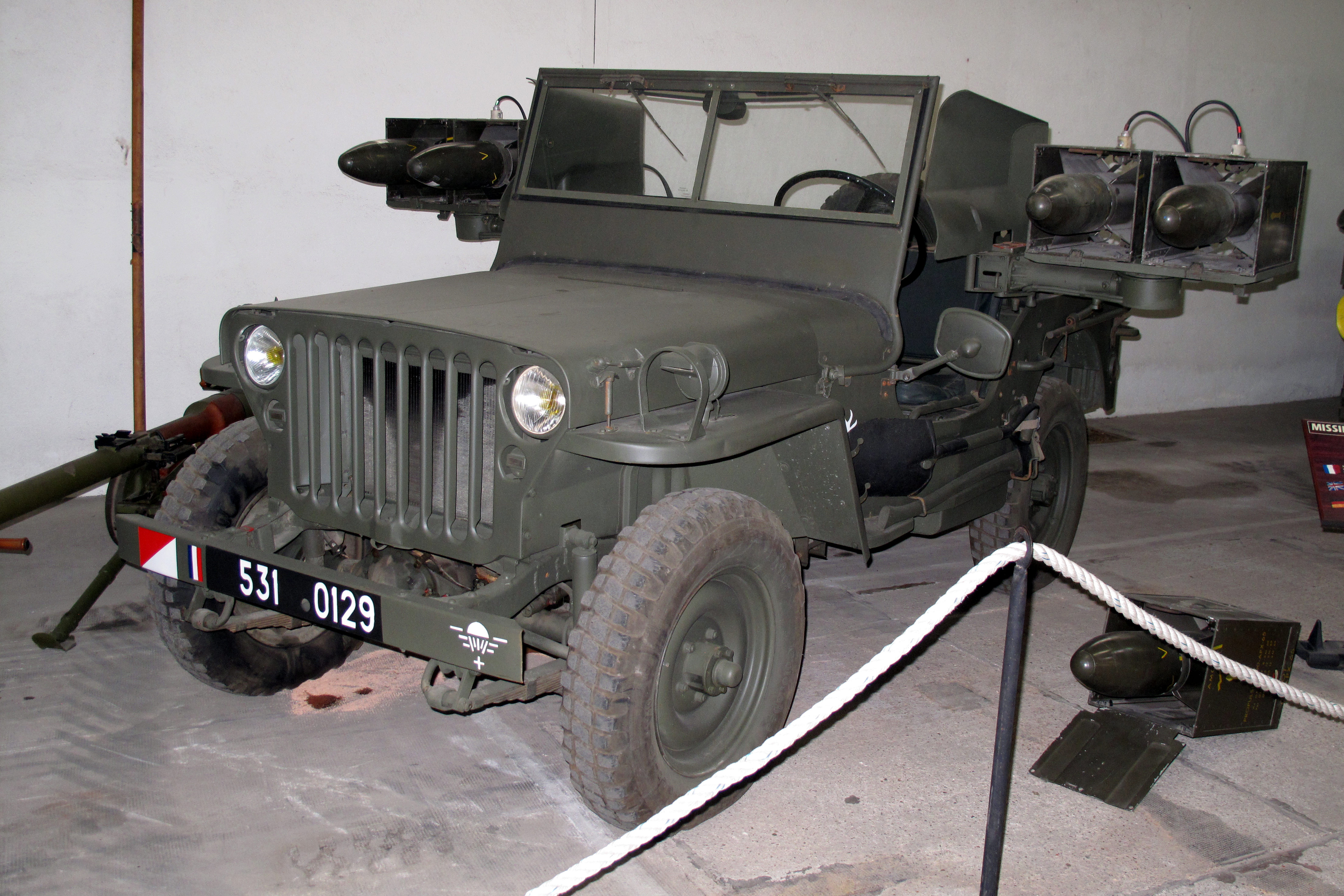
Hotchkiss M201 with ENTAC missile

The Hotchkiss M201 was the standard light utility vehicle used by the French army from shortly after the second World War until it began retiring them from French service in the 1980s. It started in 1955 as a World War II jeep built under license and in many respects was little changed when production ended in 1966. The last M201 was taken out of French service as late as year 2000. In France, it is usually simply called "La Jeep".

== Description ==
The M201 employed a simple conventional structure, designed around a light metal frame with two rigid axles suspended on leaf springs. The four-cylinder in-line engine was a modified Willys Go Devil engine and was positioned at the front and the gear box, alongside the torque splitter, was in the middle of the vehicle alongside the driver. Maximum power is 60 hp (44 kW). There was neither a roof nor doors. The standard version provided seating for four and an open load area at the back. The windscreen could be folded forward over the engine hood/bonnet.

For road use, the rear axle was driven, power being switchable also to the front axle for off-road use. The gearbox provided three forward speeds and one reverse speed for road use, and for off-road use a lower "crawler" ratio was available. There was no limited-slip differential but the vehicle's light weight and the available gearing nevertheless provided excellent off-road capability.

The military defined the M201 as a VLTT ('Véhicule Léger Tout Terrain' a.k.a. "Light all-terrain vehicle"). The standard vehicles were mostly used as staff cars or radio cars.

For use in Northern Africa, the company developed a "Sahara" version, featuring a strengthened chassis, firmer springing at the back, a supplementary tool box under the front grille and a second fuel tank beneath the passenger seat. Before long, the vehicle was also adapted for use as a launch vehicle for anti-tank guns or rockets, and some were fitted with surveillance radar dishes.

== History ==
Directly after World War II, the French government was presented by the US Army with 22,000 Willys Jeeps and Ford GPWs. The objective was to rapidly re-equip the army. Only about half of the vehicles were in a usable condition, however, and in 1946 the E.R.G.M. (Etablissement de Réserve Générale du Matériel Automobile) began work to make the vehicles usable at a Paris suburb called Maltournée, in what is now the department of Seine-Saint-Denis, to the north-east of Paris. The Jeeps in the poorest condition were broken up in order to be used as spare parts. However, this quickly created a larger inventory of many spare parts than would ever be used, and work began on building quasi-new Jeeps using the surplus spare parts obtained by breaking up the least usable of the used US-military Jeeps. As time progressed, this production process, which continued to operate until 1978, increasingly combined the old parts with new parts acquired for the purpose, each vehicle being a unique blend of Willys, Ford, and Hotchkiss components.

From 1949, the military intended to replace the Hotchkiss M201 with the Delahaye VLR, a vehicle that had much in common with the Jeep, but which was newly designed and French. The Delahaye was relatively complex, technically, but the French military insisted that this was not a problem for them. Nevertheless, by 1955, with just 9,623 of the Delahaye vehicles produced and the Delahaye company itself financially dead, production of the Delahaye VLR was suddenly abandoned very soon after Delahaye ran out of money and its assets fell into the hands of Automobiles Hotchkiss.

At this stage, the E.R.G.M was still supplying reconstructed Jeeps from its stock of surplus parts at Maltournée; however, with the Delahaye VLR no longer available, the army decided that a more permanent solution for supply of light all-terrain reconnaissance vehicles would need to be found. Hotchkiss had by now built up a reasonable understanding of the Jeeps, having been the supplier, where needed, of manufactured spare parts to the Maltournée-based assembly operation, and having also itself been producing Jeeps, primarily for civilian use in France, under licence from Willys. 70 CJ-3Bs were built under license for civilian users in 1954.

In 1955, 465 Jeeps were produced, and these were called Hotchkiss Licence MBs. From 1956, the vehicle was known simply as the Hotchkiss M201. Volumes picked up towards the end of the decade, with the military taking delivery of 2,696 of the vehicles in 1959 alone. The civilian market proved more fickle, however, taking no more than 366 JH-101 models (the designation given by Hotchkiss to the civilian versions of the vehicle, beginning in 1955) in 1959, down from 987 in 1958. By 1966 Hotchkiss had produced 27,628 M201s, mostly at a plant in Stains, a short distance to the north of Paris.

Possibly on grounds of price, and possibly because of the lack of a suitable dealer network, attempts to sell the vehicle into the civilian market never amounted to much. In January 1961, the civilian version was homologated with the government as the JH-102, replacing the JH-101 and entering production little by little during the ensuing months, albeit with few obvious differences. For 1962 Hotchkiss offered an alternative power unit, the Peugeot Indenor diesel engine introduced for the Peugeot 403 in 1959. This was an exceptionally good year for the Hotchkiss Jeep and the military took 4,370 of the vehicles, while the civilian market took just 269. Where they were used outside the army, the Hotchkiss Jeeps were chiefly used in agriculture and forestry.

In 1981, with 8,000 Jeeps in use, the army finally took the decision to replace the M201 with the Mercedes designed Peugeot P4. Nearly two decades later, in 2000, the last of the M201s was taken out of service.

== See also ==
- List of weapons of the Lebanese Civil War
- Willys MB
- Willys M38
- Willys M38A1
- Jeep CJ
