= Carrosserie Worblaufen =

Swiss car body manufacturer

Carrosserie Worblaufen, F. Ramseier & Co. was a Swiss manufacturer of car bodies headquartered in Worblaufen near Bern from 1929 to 1958. The company is different to Carrosserie Ramseier in Bern and Biel.

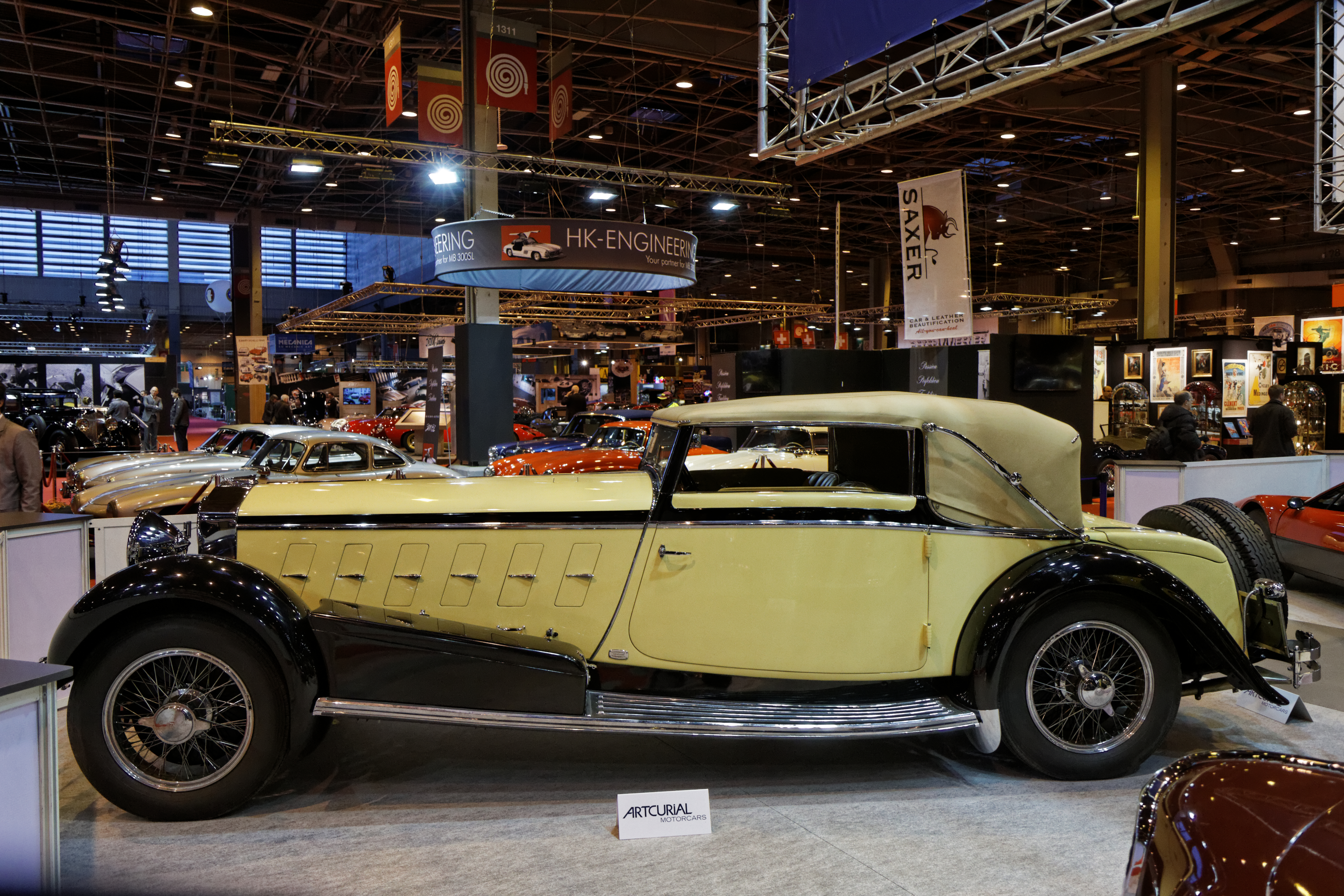
Isotta Fraschini 8A cabriolet Ramseier

The company was founded by Fritz Ramseier-Scheidiger in 1900 in Worblaufen and mainly built trailer and truck bodies. Ramseier-Scheidiger passed the company on to his son Fritz Ramseier in 1929, who renamed the company to "Fritz Ramseier & Co., Carrosserie Worblaufen"; it is also known as "Carrosserie Worblaufen". Sometimes the company is in English publications referred to as "Ramseier Bros.", since Fritz Ramseier included his brothers Hans and Ernst in the enterprise.

Carosserie Worblaufen was a leading company for luxurious car bodies in Switzerland. It was especially known for sporty, elegant, open designs.

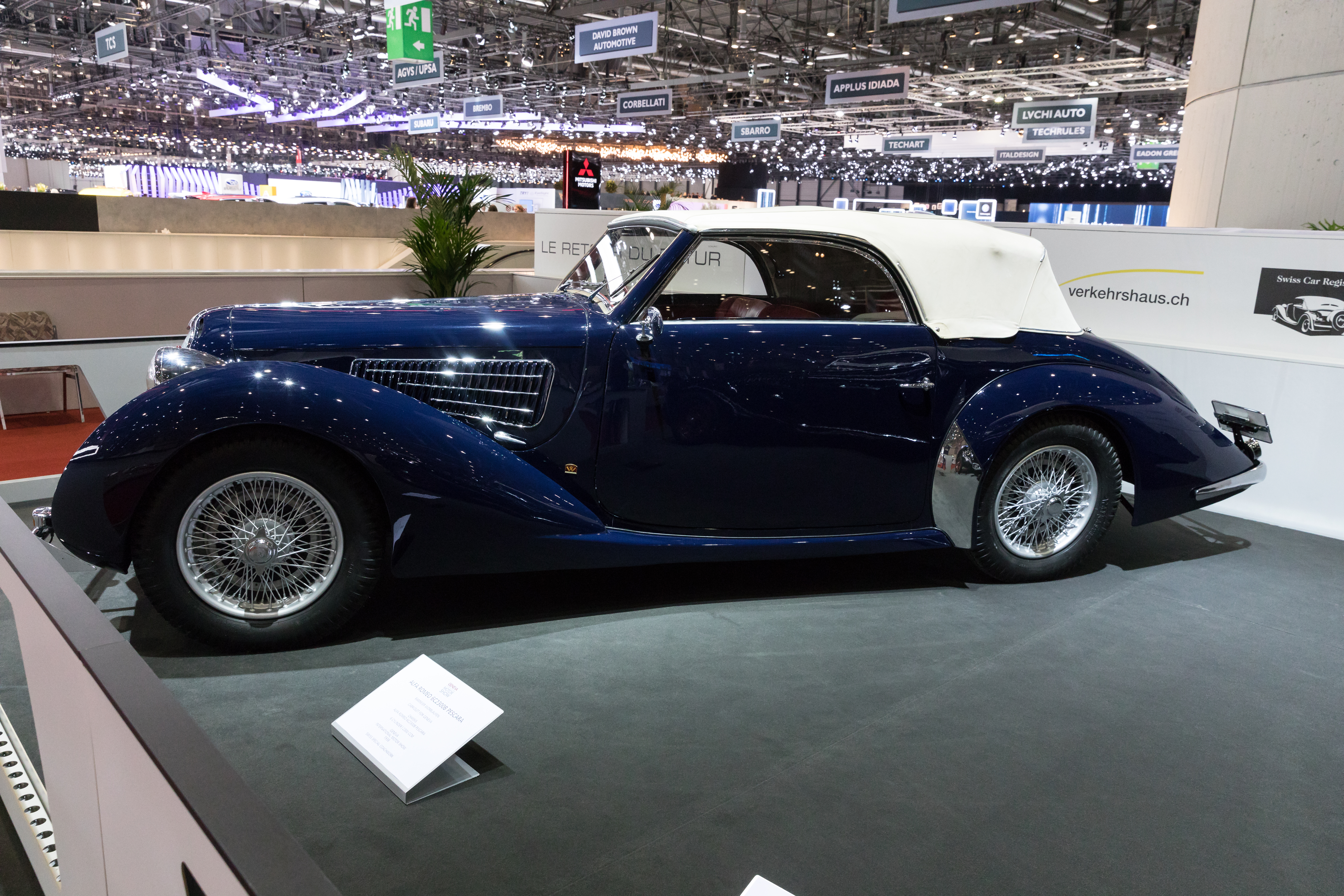
Alfa Romeo 6C 2300 Pescara cabriolet Worblaufen

Famous Worblaufen car bodies were used for Alfa Romeo, Bentley, BMW, Bugatti (Type 57 Grand Raid Roadster, Body Nr. 57260), Citroën, Delahaye (7 Type 135s which according to the Swiss Car Register still (2017) exist), Isotta Fraschini, Jaguar, Lancia, Mercedes-Benz and Talbot-Lago.

Shortly after the end of WWII a four-door convertible was built on the chassis of a Packard Clipper Super or Super Eight. Worblaufen mixed design elements of both cars: the front was a 22nd and 23rd series Packards (1948–1950) but the sides lacked the continuous indentation. Instead, the sides were inspired by the Clipper of the 19th and 20th series (1941–1947).

In March 1950 Worblaufen introduced a convertible on a Bentley Mark VI chassis at the Geneva Motor Show.

However, the disappearance of traditional automobile manufacturers producing cars in bare chassis form forced Worblaufen, like many other coachbuilders at around the same time, to give up on the car body production in 1958. The company continued to make vehicle repairs and specialist truck conversions, until 1983.
