= Bentley 3.5 Litre =

Bentley 3½-litre and 4¼-litre
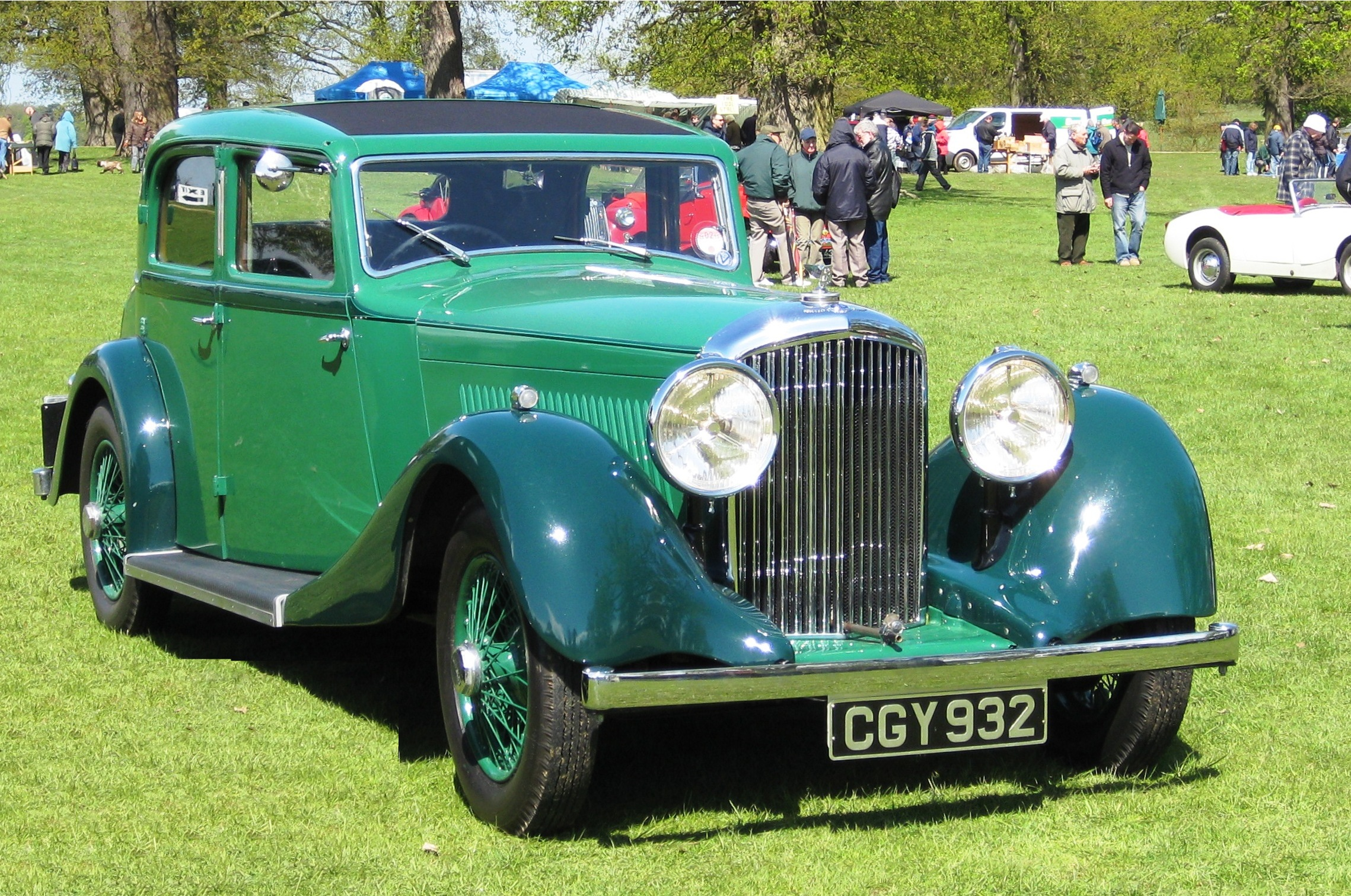
- Sports saloon by Park Ward, 1935

Overview
- Manufacturer: Bentley Motors (1931)
- Production: 1933–1939; 2,411 produced
- Assembly: United Kingdom: Derby, England (chassis only)

Body and chassis
- Class: Full-size luxury car
- Body style: Chassis provided, customer to select own coachbuilder and body style
- Layout: FR layout

Powertrain
- Engine: 3½ L I6; 4¼ L I6; Chassis numbers A to F 3½ Litre; G to L(not I) 4¼ Litre; M 4¼ Litre overdrive
- Transmission: 4-speed manual

Dimensions
- Wheelbase: 126 in (3,200 mm)

Chronology
- Predecessor: Cricklewood Bentleys
- Successor: Bentley Mark V

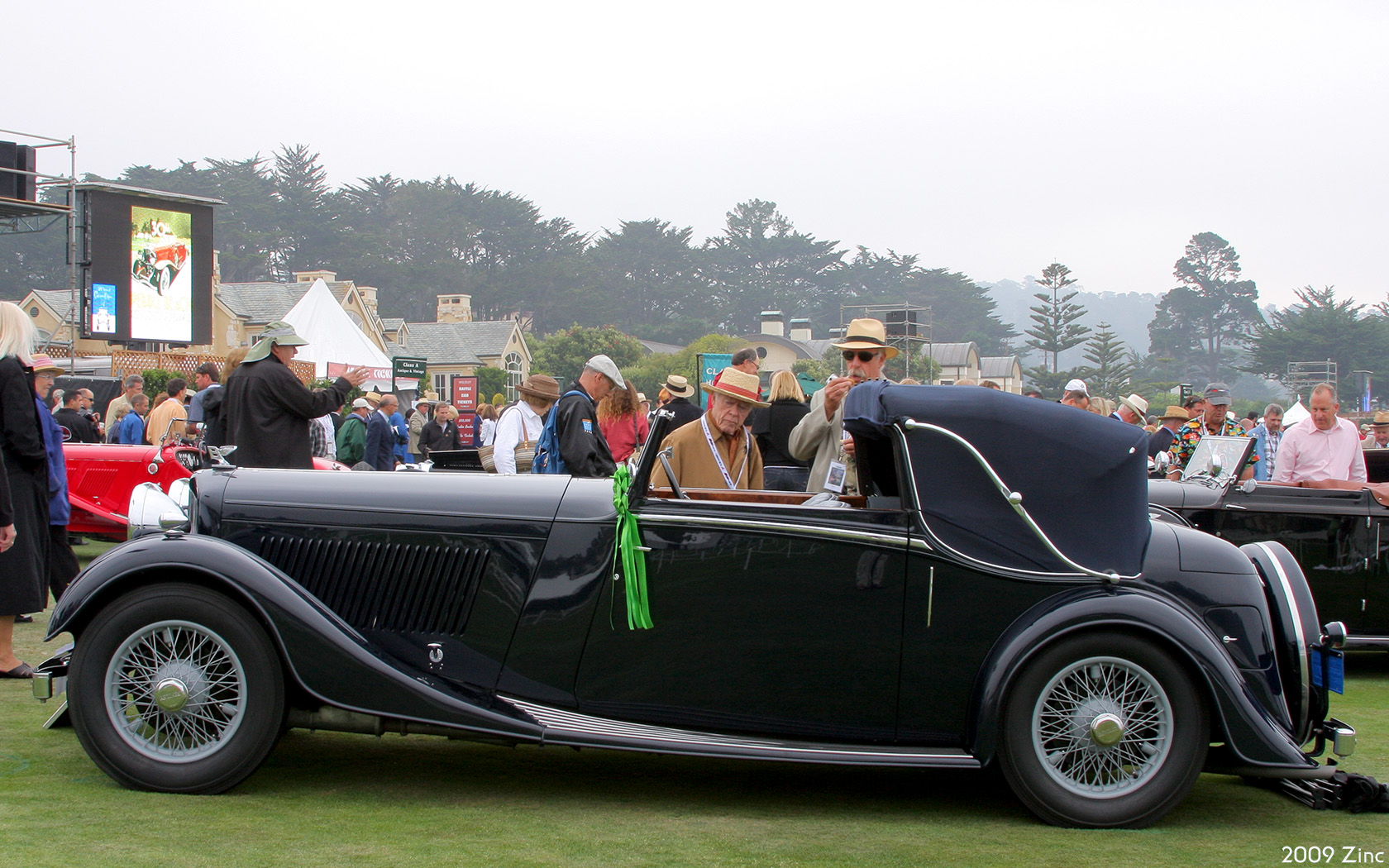
3½-litre coupé de ville by Thrupp & Maberly 1934

The Bentley 3½ Litre (later enlarged to 4¼ Litre) was a luxury car produced by Bentley from 1933 to 1939. It was presented to the public in September 1933, shortly after the death of Henry Royce, and was the first new Bentley model following Rolls-Royce's acquisition of the Bentley brand in 1931.

Bentley sold only the drivable bare rolling chassis with engine and gearbox, scuttle and radiator, ready for coachbuilders to construct on it a body to the buyer's requirements. Many distributors ordered their preferred bodies as showroom stock to enable them to stock finished cars ready for immediate sale.

Bentleys of this era are known as Derby Bentleys because they were built in the Rolls-Royce factory located in Derby, England. Those of Bentley's previous independent era are Cricklewood Bentleys.

Chassis series A to F were 3½ Litre cars; G to L (excluding I) were 4¼ Litres, and the M series was the 4¼ Litre Overdrive chassis. Each series consisted of 100 chassis numbers, either odd or even. The numbers 13 and 113 in each series were not used, to avoid upsetting superstitious customers.

== Market ==
From the outset, the car was intended to compete on quality and grace rather than sporting reputation which had been the cornerstone of the pre-1931 Bentley company. The cars retained the famous curved radiator shape based on earlier Bentley models, but in all meaningful respects they were clearly Rolls-Royces. Although disappointing some traditional customers, they were well received by many others and even W.O. Bentley himself was reported as saying that he would "rather own this Bentley than any other car produced under that name." The Rolls-Royce Engineer in charge of the development project, Ernest Hives (later Lord Hives), underlined the Rolls-Royce modus operandi in a memo addressed to company staff "our recommendation is that we should make the car as good as we know how and then charge accordingly." At a time when the Ford 8 could be purchased new for £100, an early Bentley 3½ Litre cost around £1,500 (equivalent to £8,967 vs. £134,510 today), putting it beyond the reach of all but the wealthiest consumers. Despite not being a car of remarkable outright performance, the car's unique blend of style and grace proved popular with the inter-war elite and it was advertised under the legend the silent sports car. Over 70% of the cars built between 1933 and 1939 were said to have still been in existence 70 years later. Although chassis production ceased in 1939, a number of cars were still being bodied and delivered during 1940. The last few were delivered and first registered in 1941.

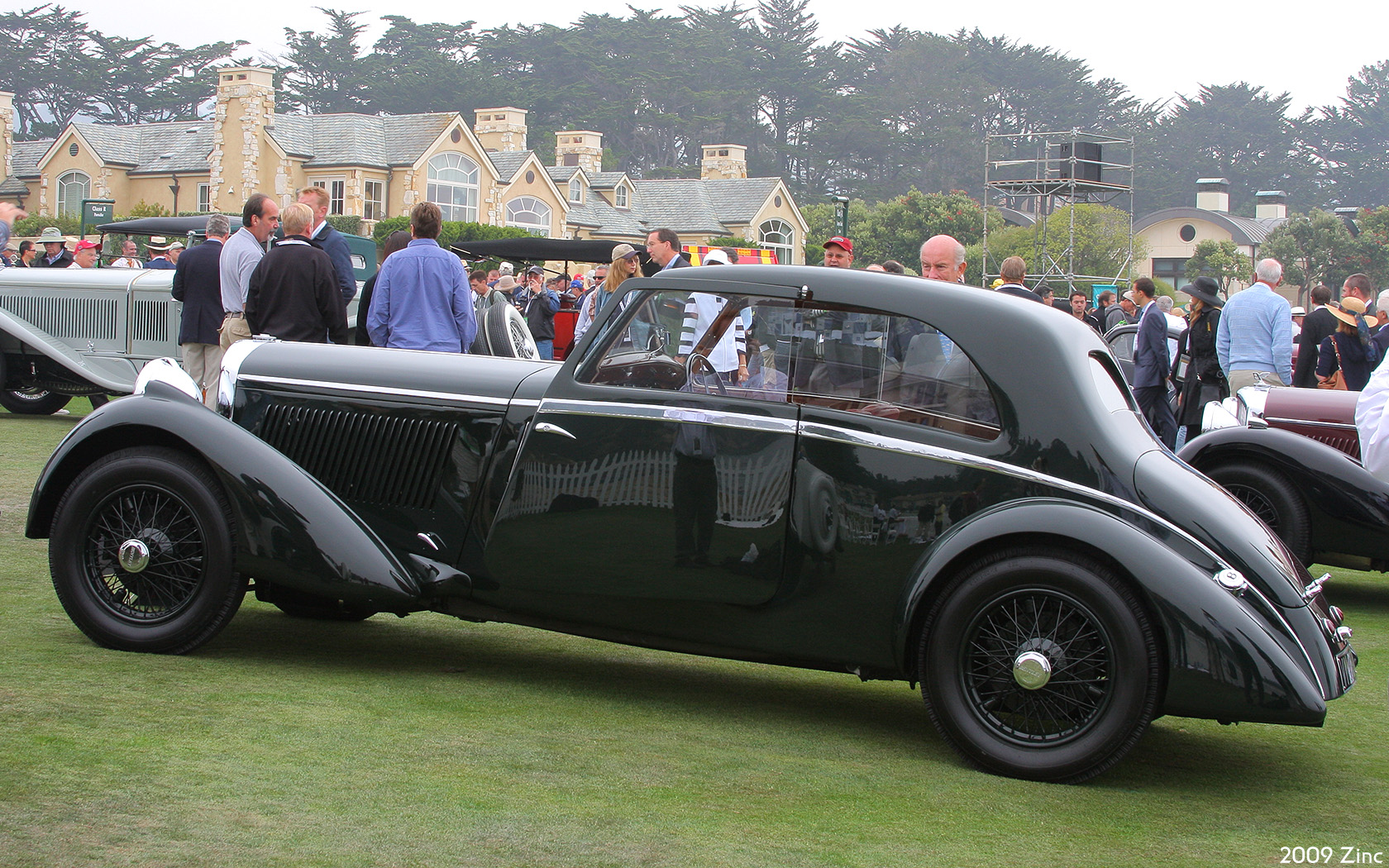
3½-litre fixed head coupé by Bertelli of Feltham 1935

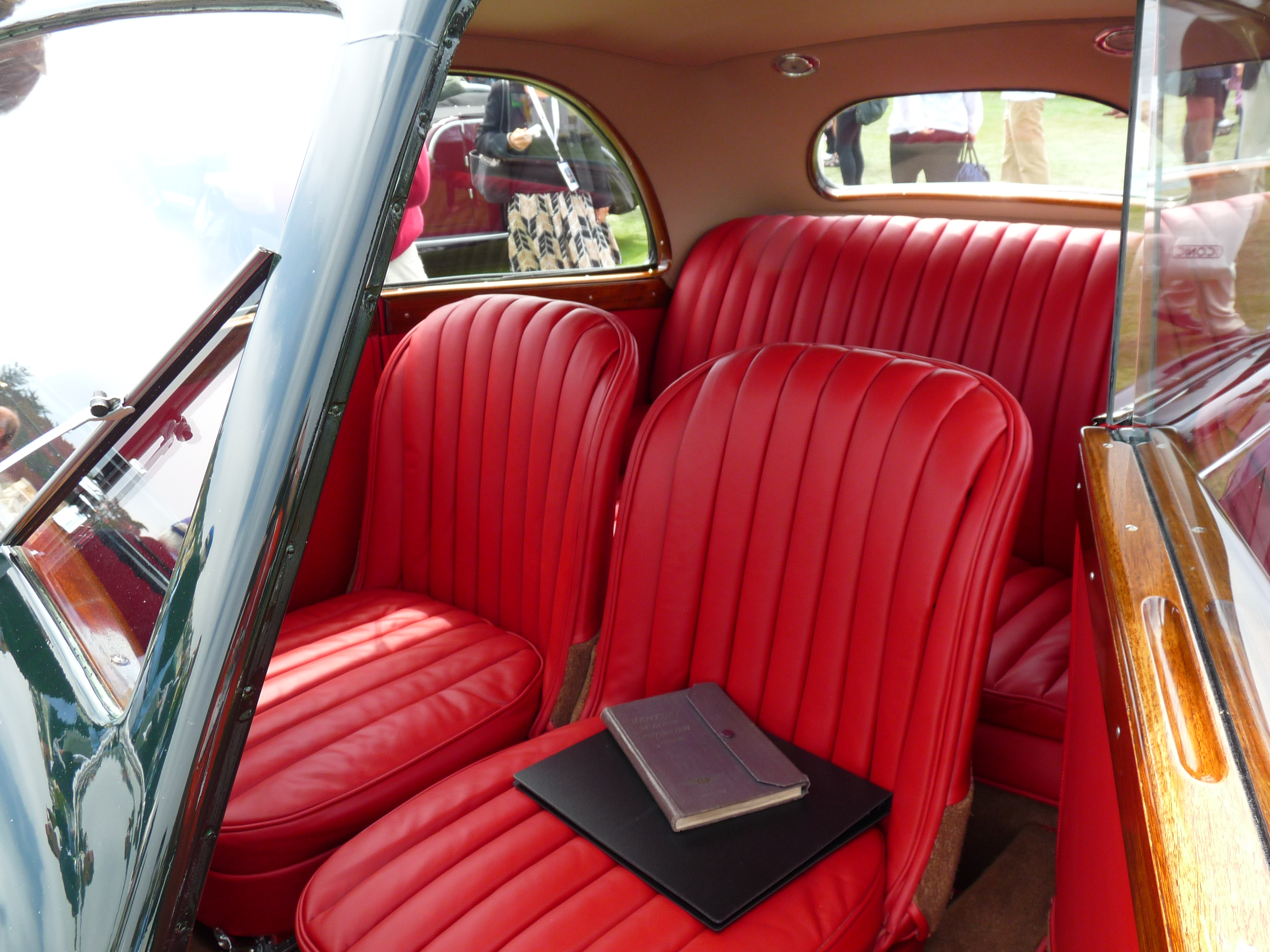
3½-litre fixed head coupé interior

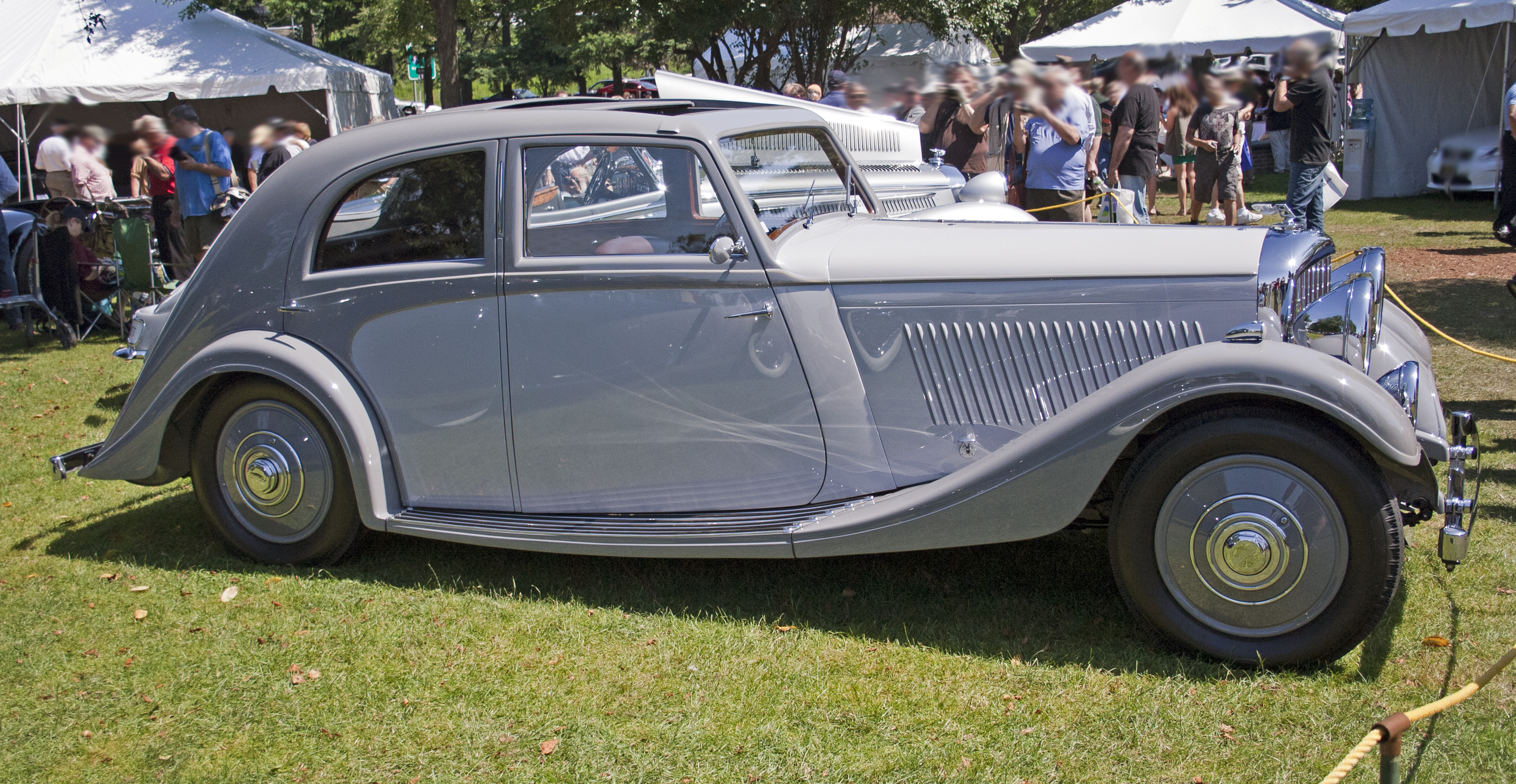
3½-litre aero sports saloon by Rippon Bros. 1935

== 3½ Litre ==
Based on an experimental Rolls-Royce project "Peregrine" which was to have had a supercharged 2¾ L engine, the 3½ Litre was finally fitted with a less adventurous engine developed from Rolls' straight-6 fitted to the Rolls-Royce 20/25. The Bentley variant had a higher compression ratio, sportier camshaft profile and two SU carburettors on a crossflow cylinder head. Actual power output was about 110 bhp (82 kW) at 4,500 rpm, allowing the car to reach 90 mph (145 km/h). The engine displaced 3.7 L (3,669 cc or 223 in³) with a 3¼ in (82.5 mm) bore and 4½ in (114.3 mm) stroke.

A 4-speed manual transmission with synchromesh on 3rd and 4th, 4-wheel leaf spring suspension, and 4-wheel servo-assisted mechanical brakes were all common with other Rolls-Royce models. The chassis was manufactured from nickel steel, with a "double-dropped" layout to gain vertical space for the axles and thus keep the profiles of the cars low. The strong chassis needed no diagonal cross-bracing, and was very light in comparison to the chassis built by its contemporary competitors, weighing in at 2,510 lb (1,139 kg) in driveable form ready for delivery to the customer's chosen coachbuilder.

1,177 3½ Litre cars were built, about half of them bodied by Park Ward, and the remainder by coachbuilders including Barker, Carlton, Freestone & Webb, Gurney Nutting, Hooper, Mann Egerton, Mulliner (both Arthur and H J), Rippon Bros, Thrupp & Maberly, James Young, Vanden Plas and Windovers in England; Figoni et Falaschi, Kellner, Saoutchik and Vanvooren in Paris; and smaller concerns elsewhere in UK and Europe.

A drophead 3½ Litre was briefly featured as James Bond's vehicle in the 1963 movie From Russia with Love.

== 4¼ Litre ==
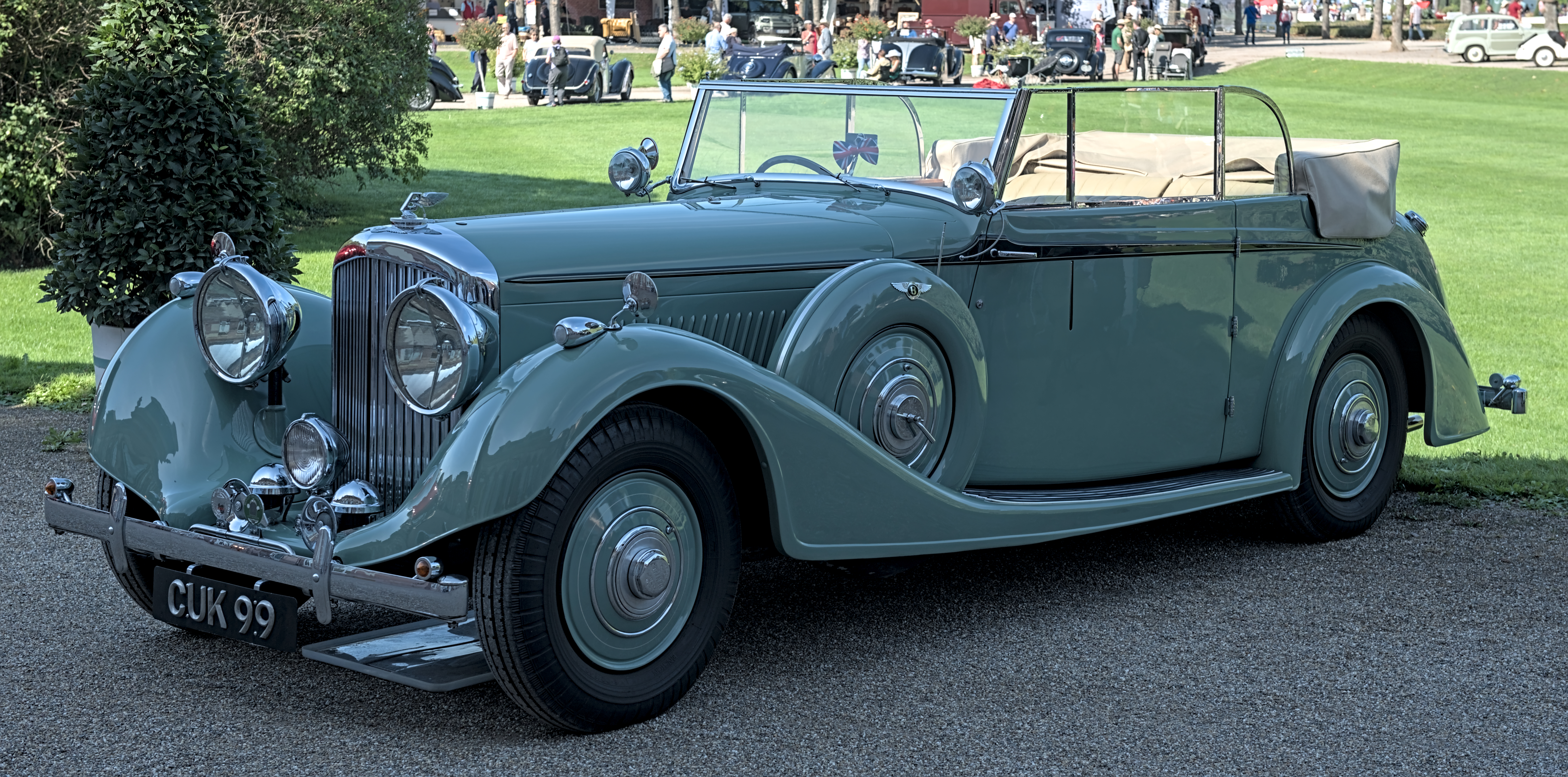
4¼-litre DHC 1939 by Vanden Plas

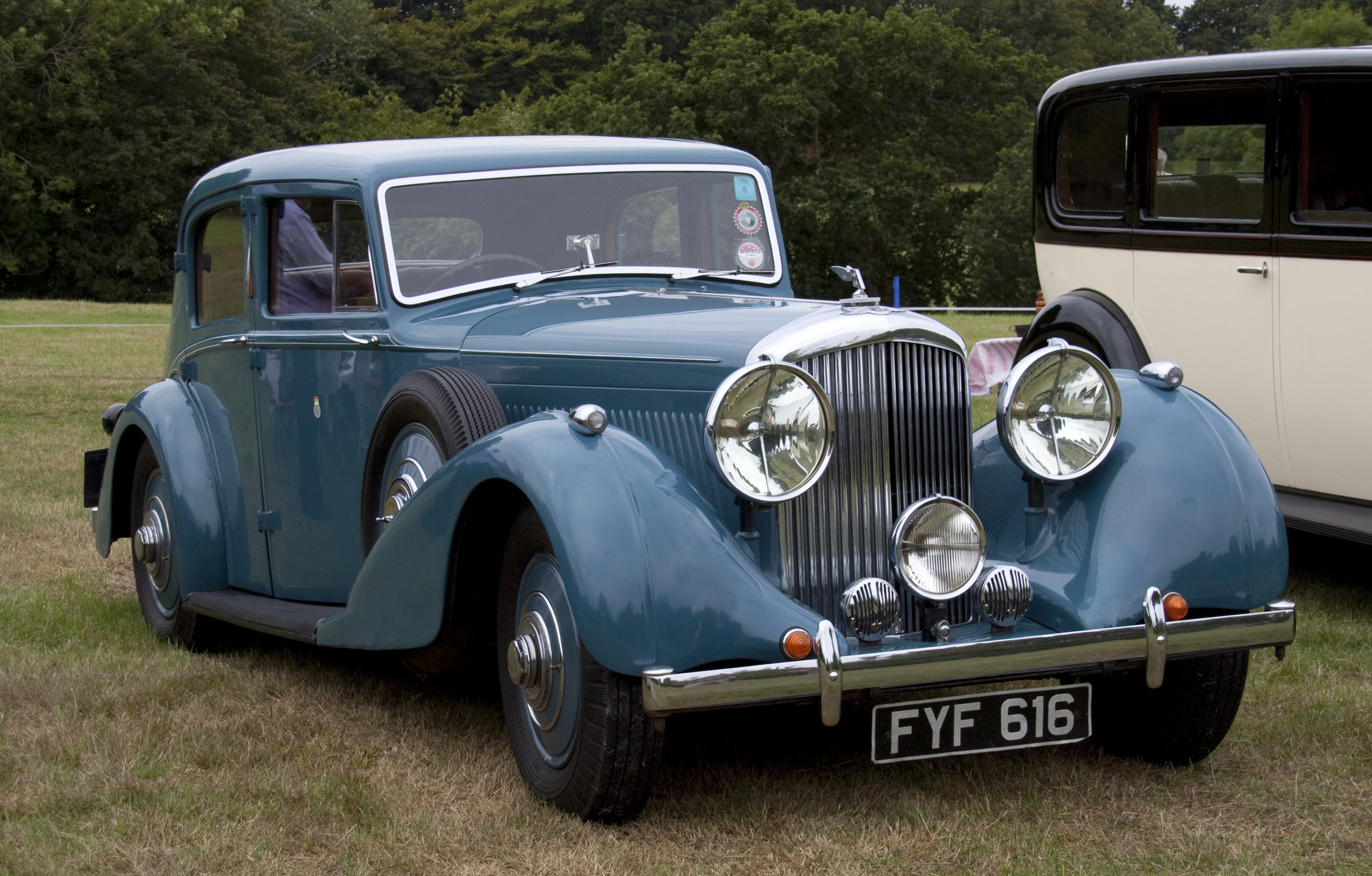
4¼-litre 4-door sports saloon 1940 by Park Ward

From March 1936, a 4¼ Litre version of the car was offered as replacement for the 3½ Litre, in order to offset the increasing weight of coachwork and maintain the car's sporting image in the face of stiff competition. The engine was bored to 3½ in (88.9 mm) for a total of 4.3 L (4,257 cc or 259 in³). From 1938 the MR and MX series cars featured Marles steering and an overdrive gearbox. The model was replaced in 1939 by the MkV, but some cars were still finished and delivered during 1940–1941.

1,234 4¼ Litre cars were built, with Park Ward remaining the most popular coachbuilder. Many cars were bodied in steel rather than the previous, more expensive, aluminium over ash frame construction.

A drophead 4¼ Litre was featured as James Bond's car in the 1983 movie Never Say Never Again.

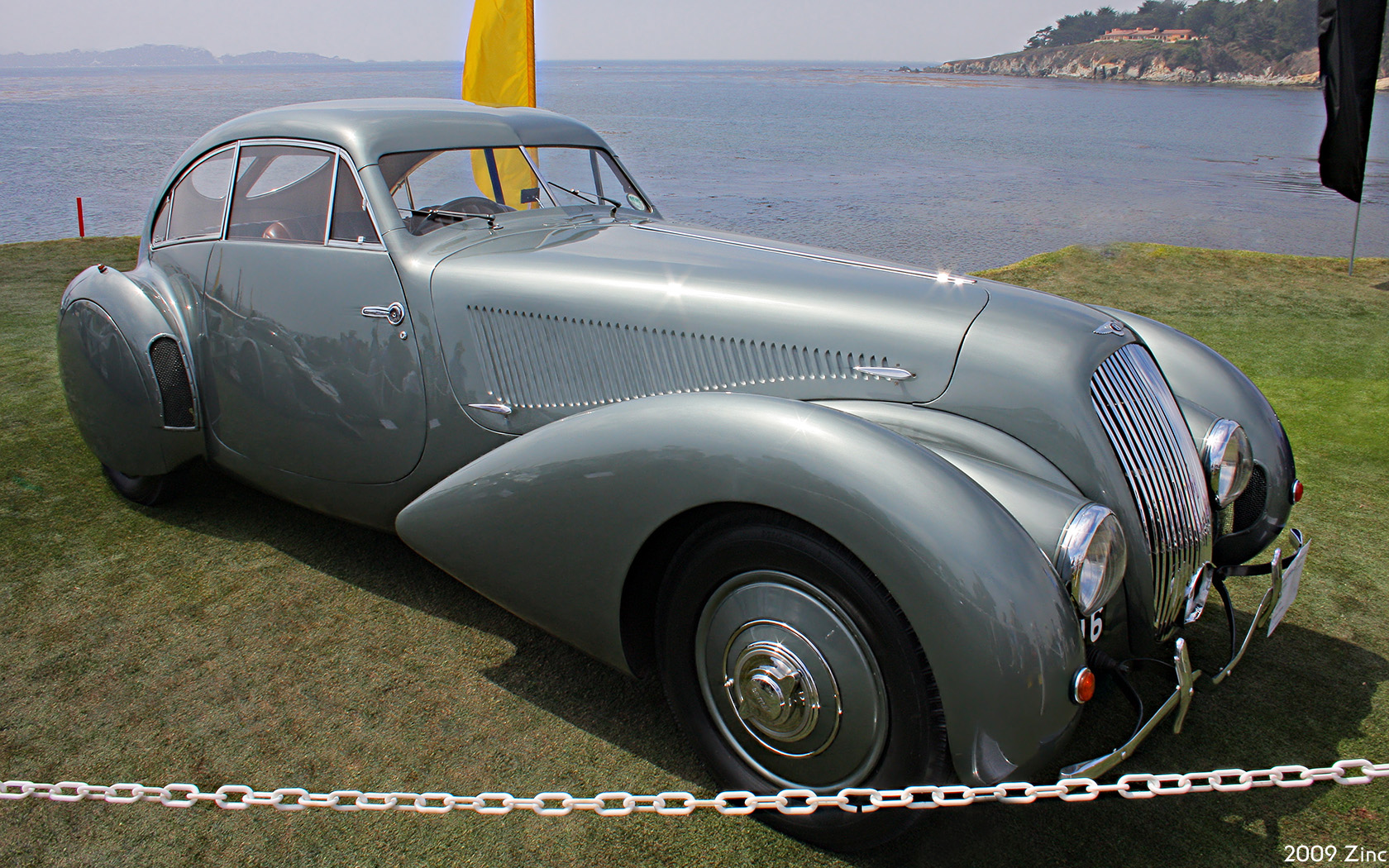
4¼-litre fixed head coupé 1939 by Pourtout of Paris for André Embiricos

=== Bentley Continental ===
Motorsport announced in March 1939 that the fixed head coupé designed by Paulin and built by Portout to the special order of André Embiricos is the prototype of a new Continental model in the Bentley range.

The new production car would have high compression pistons and larger SU carburettors giving an extra 15 bhp (11 kW; 15 PS) output and its weight reduced from the standard car's by about 336 lb (152 kg) or 3 cwt. The maximum speed was expected to be 120 mph (193 km/h) and fuel consumption 26 mpg_{‑imp} (11 L/100 km; 22 mpg_{‑US}) at 60 mph (97 km/h).

"Bentley must be justifiably proud of doing with a straightforward, push-rod engine what other makers cannot approach with overhead camshafts and blowers."

== Famous first owners ==
- Woolf Barnato, racing driver & former Bentley chairman (B121AE, B2DG, B6GA, B121GP)
- Prince Bira, racing driver and Olympic sailor (B29GP)
- Sir Malcolm Campbell, nine times World Land Speed Record holder (B141AE, B206GA, B22GA)
- Billy Cotton, bandleader (B125DG)
- George Eyston, three time World Land Speed Record holder (B24DG, B82GA)
- E.R. Hall, racing driver and Winter Olympian (B35AE, B106GA, B216GA) Entered car in 1934, 1935 and 1936 TT races on Ards Circuit
- Raymond Mays, racing driver (B125DG, B24GA, B144LS)
- Robert Montgomery, actor (B63DK)
- Sir Ernest Oppenheimer, diamond and gold mining entrepreneur, financier and philanthropist (B130BL)
- Bernard Rubin, racing driver (B109CW)

== Racing ==
The Derby Bentley was not intended to be used as a racing car, unlike the earlier, pre-Rolls-Royce, cars built by W.O. Bentley. However, some examples were used for competition at an international level, including:

- A 3½-Litre (later 4¼-Litre) raced by E.R. Hall in the RAC Tourist Trophy (TT) in Ulster in 1934, 1935 and 1936. It was the first competition car built at Rolls-Royce since the car built for Charles Rolls which he had driven to win the 1906 TT, and it was also their last.
- Hall also raced the 4¼-Litre car at Le Mans in 1950, becoming the first man to drive solo for the entire distance of the race.
- A 4¼-Litre with a streamlined-body by Pourtout of Paris for Greek racing driver A.M. Embiricos set a record of 115.05 mph (185.16 km/h) at Brooklands.
- The Embiricos car also raced at Le Mans in 1949, 1950 and 1951 becoming the first car ever to have finished that event three years in succession.
