= Carrosserie Vanvooren =

French coachbuilder

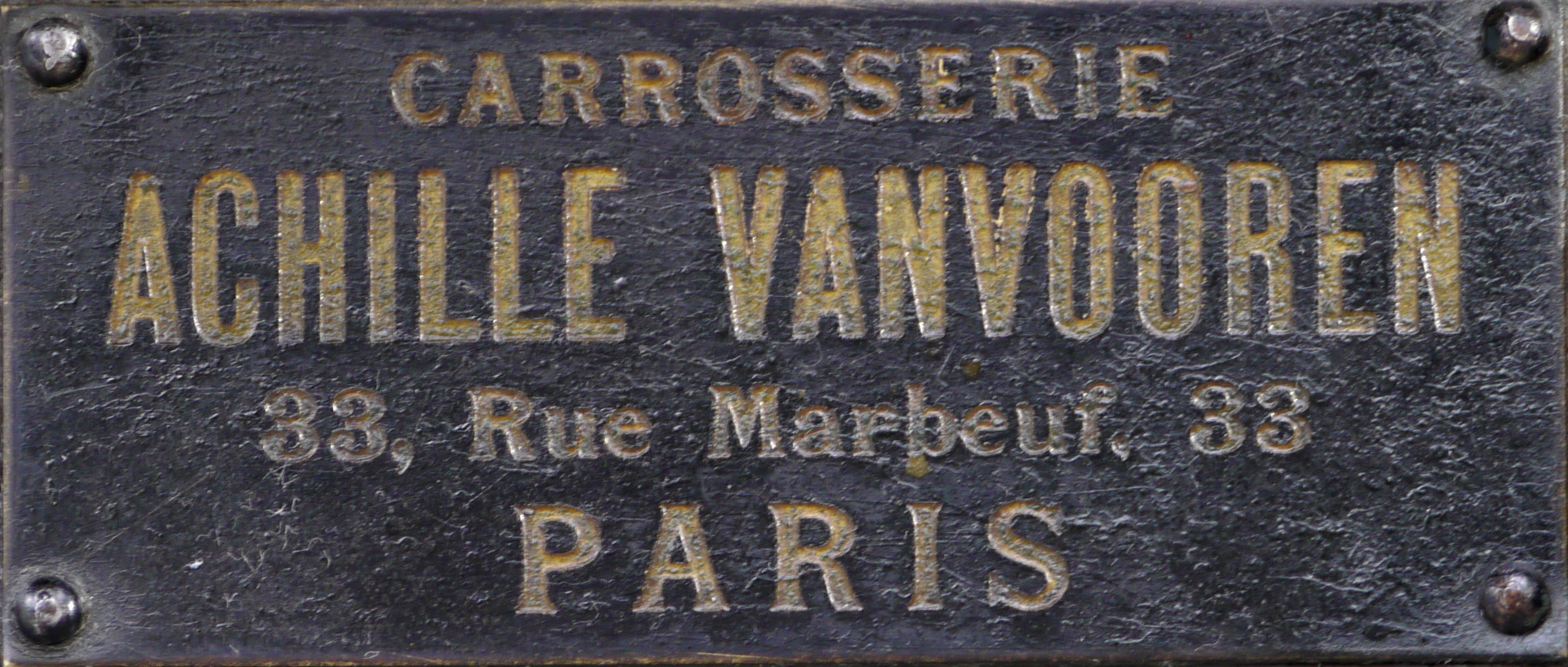
(1911)

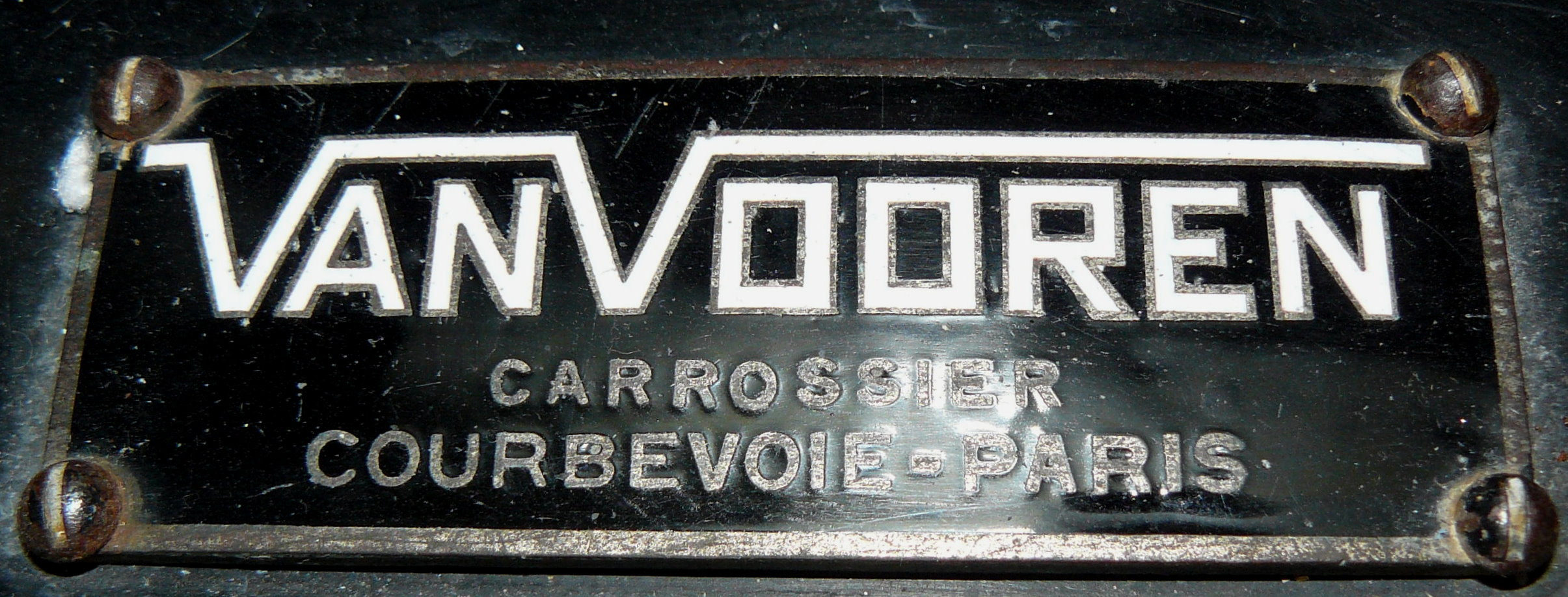
(1934)

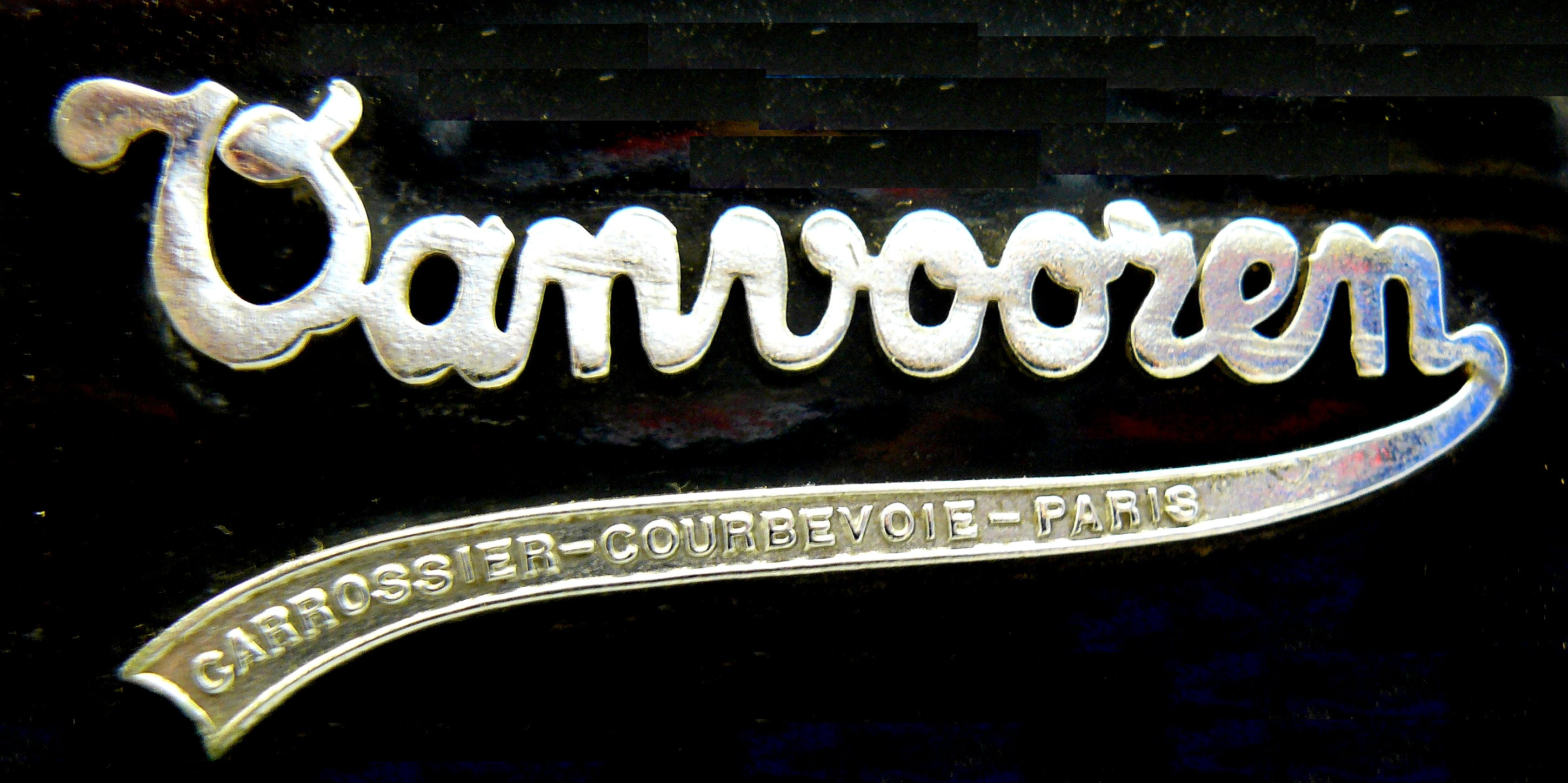
(1937)

Carrosserie Vanvooren was a French coachbuilder based in the north-western Paris suburb of Courbevoie. The company concentrated on producing car bodies for luxury cars, being closely associated during the 1930s with the products of Hispano-Suiza, Bugatti, Rolls-Royce and Bentley.

In addition to their production facilities on the edge of town, Vanvooren had a show room at 33 Rue Marbeuf in the exclusive 8th arrondissement of Paris.

Carrosserie Vanvooren was active between 1888 and 1950, but in terms of output and of reputation the company's golden decades were the 1920s and 1930s.

== History ==
=== 1888 to 1929 ===
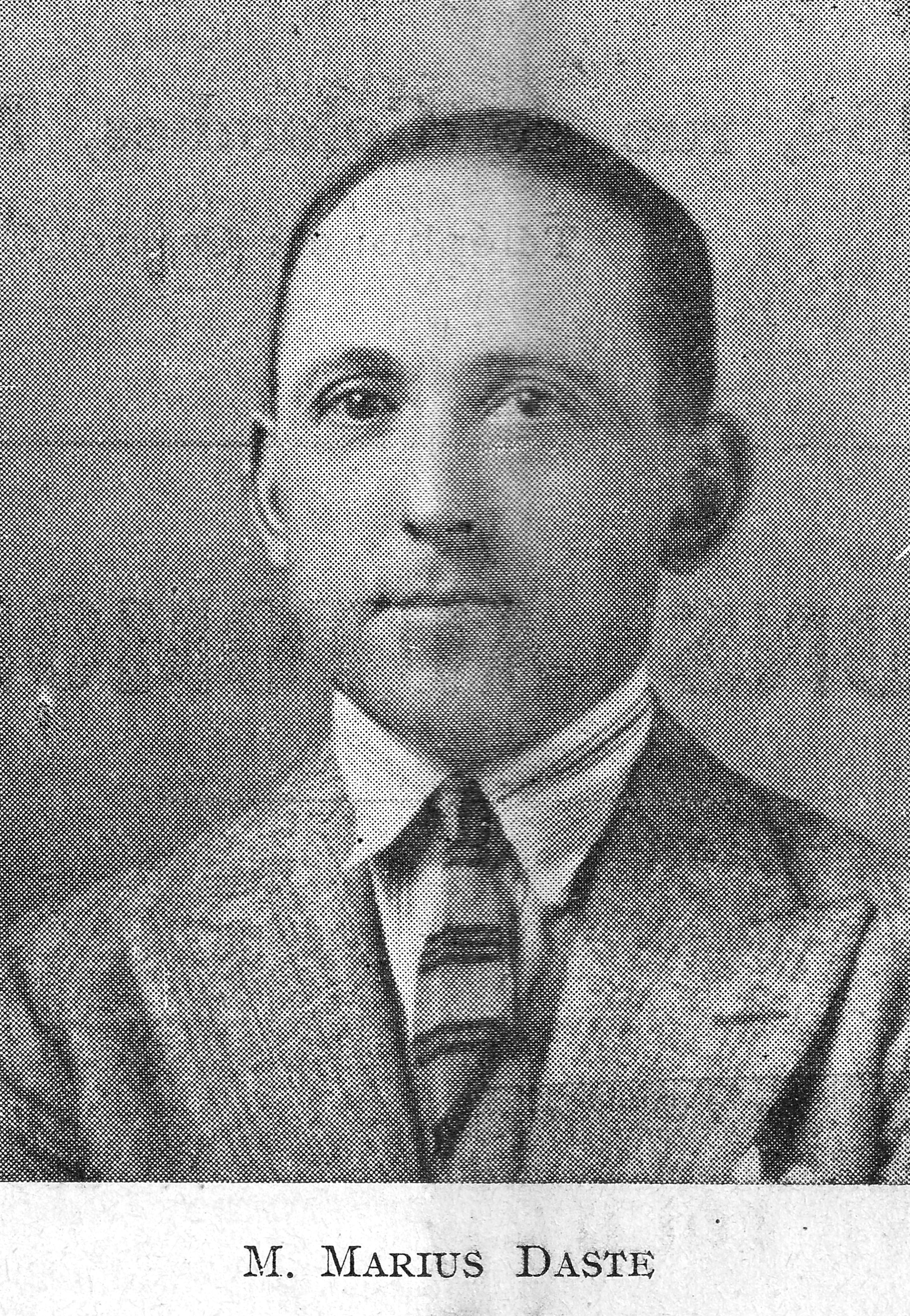
The transfer of the business by Vanvooren to his technical director, Marius Daste, in 1921, ushered in a period of expansion.

Achille Vanvooren (1857 - 1928) began his Corbevoie-based business in 1888, producing bodies for carriages and cars. The firm's reputation grew rapidly. The oldest surviving Vanvooren bodied car, dating from 1911, is a Mercedes 38/70HP, delivered to Samuel Colt, heir to his uncle's weaponry dynasty. A 1912 Vanvooren bodied Panhard & Levassor Typ X14 20HP also survives as does a Vanvooren bodied Hotchkiss 55HP Roadster from the same year. The number of car bodies produced climbed each year.

In 1921 Vanvooren retired from the business he had created, handing over control to his technical director, Marius Joseph Daste.

A licence was obtained from Carrossier Weymann in 1923 for the production of light-weight car bodies. Charles Weymann is remembered as an aircraft pioneer, and his car body designs, with timber frames and synthetic leather skins, clearly drew inspiration from the aircraft of the time. Vanvooren mounted Weymann designed bodies on various chassis including those of the Hispano-Suiza H6 and of the Bugattis T43 and T44.

In 1927 a Vanvooren bodied Rolls-Royce "New Phantom" (chassis number 27EF) went to a British customer. This would be the first of many Vanvooren bodied Rolls-Royces.

1929 saw another milestone when company boss Marius Daste, working in collaboration with his new business partner Romée de Prandières, developed and patented a flexible metal-reinforced car-body structure, employing the "Silentbloc" rubber anti-vibration mountings and joints manufactured by a neighbouring firm called "Repusseau and company" ("Repusseau et cie."). These were used to connect the massive steel ladder format chassis of the luxury cars of the time to the Vanvooren timber frames of the car bodies, and successfully eliminated the unavoidable squeaks and rattles that had hitherto been a feature of large coach-built cars. They also limited the risk of timber bodies becoming torn in response to excessive flexing from the steel chassis to which they were attached.

=== 1930 to 1939 ===
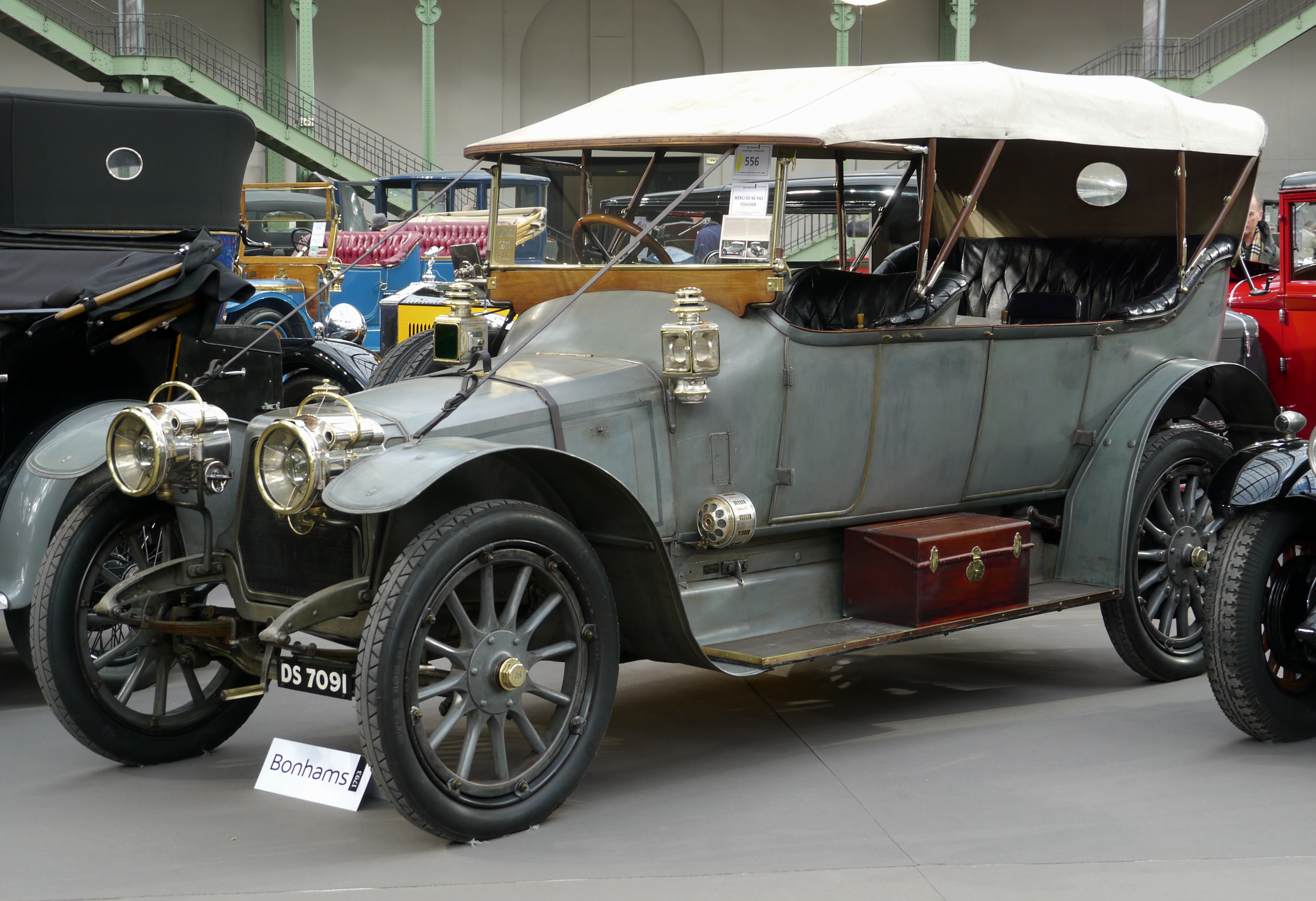
Vanvooren bodied Panhard et Levassor X14 25hp (1911)

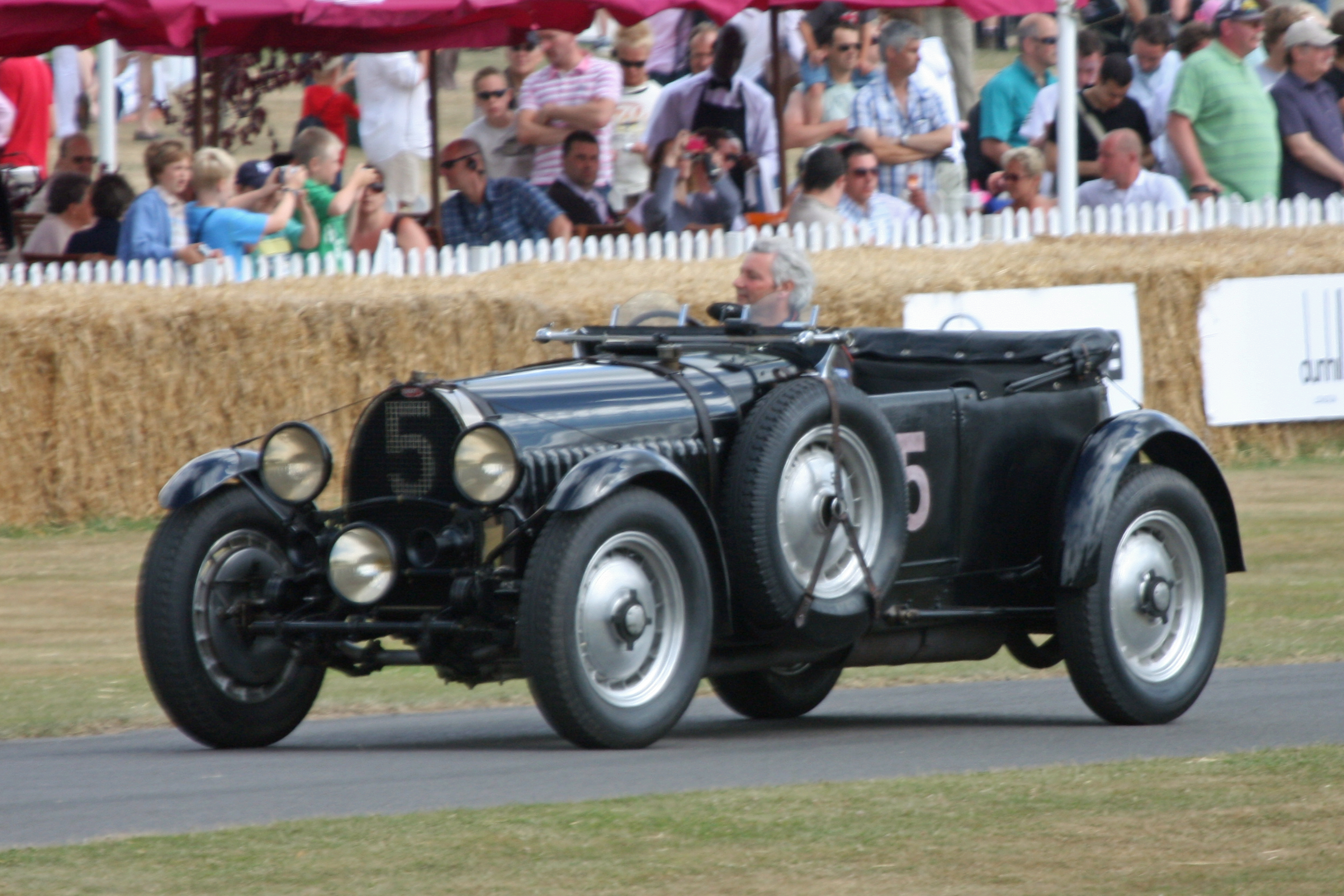
Vanvooren provided the coachwork for the Torpedo bodied Type 50s which featured in the 24 Hours Le Mans race of 1931

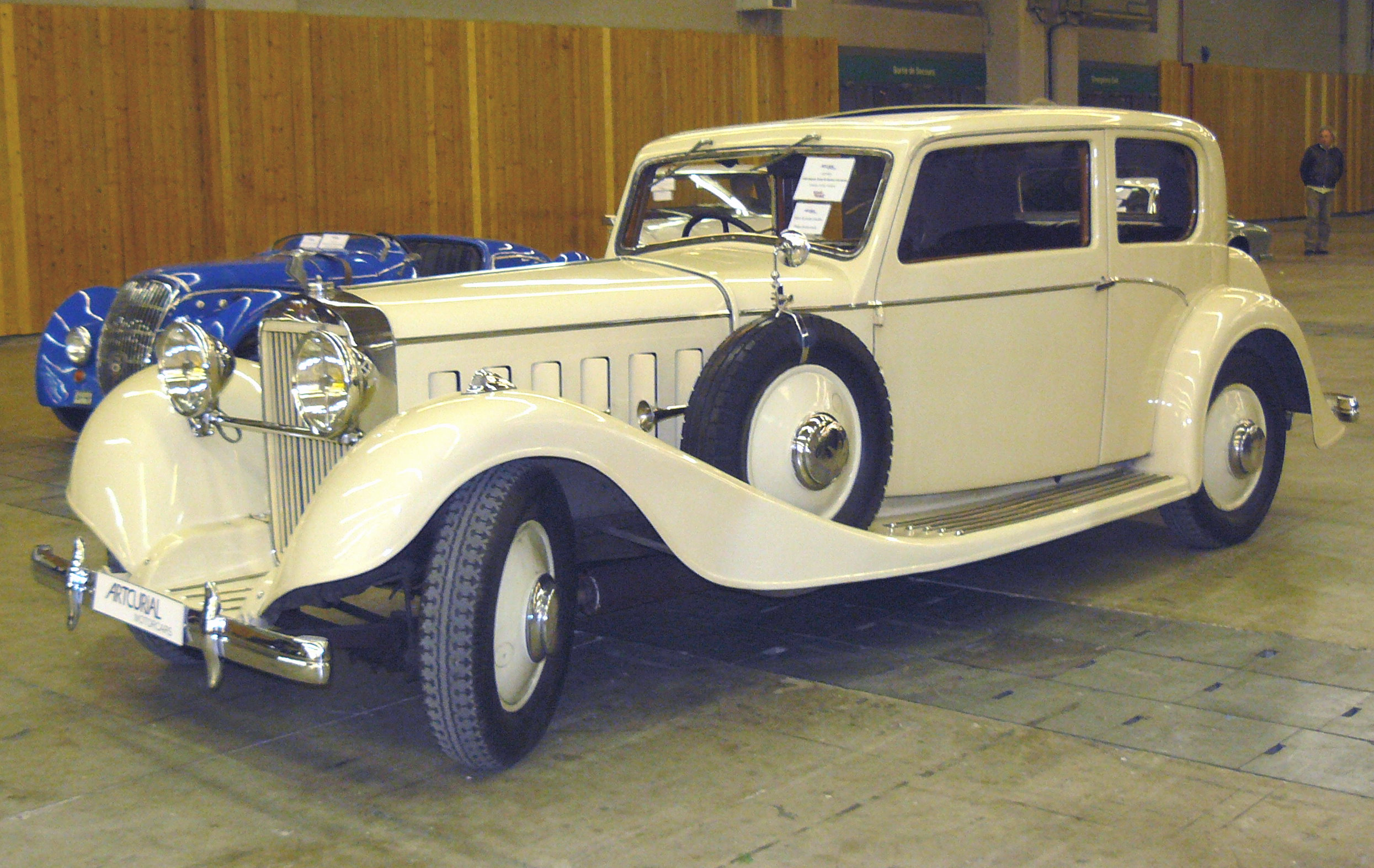
Vanvooren bodied Hispano-Suiza K6 (1934)

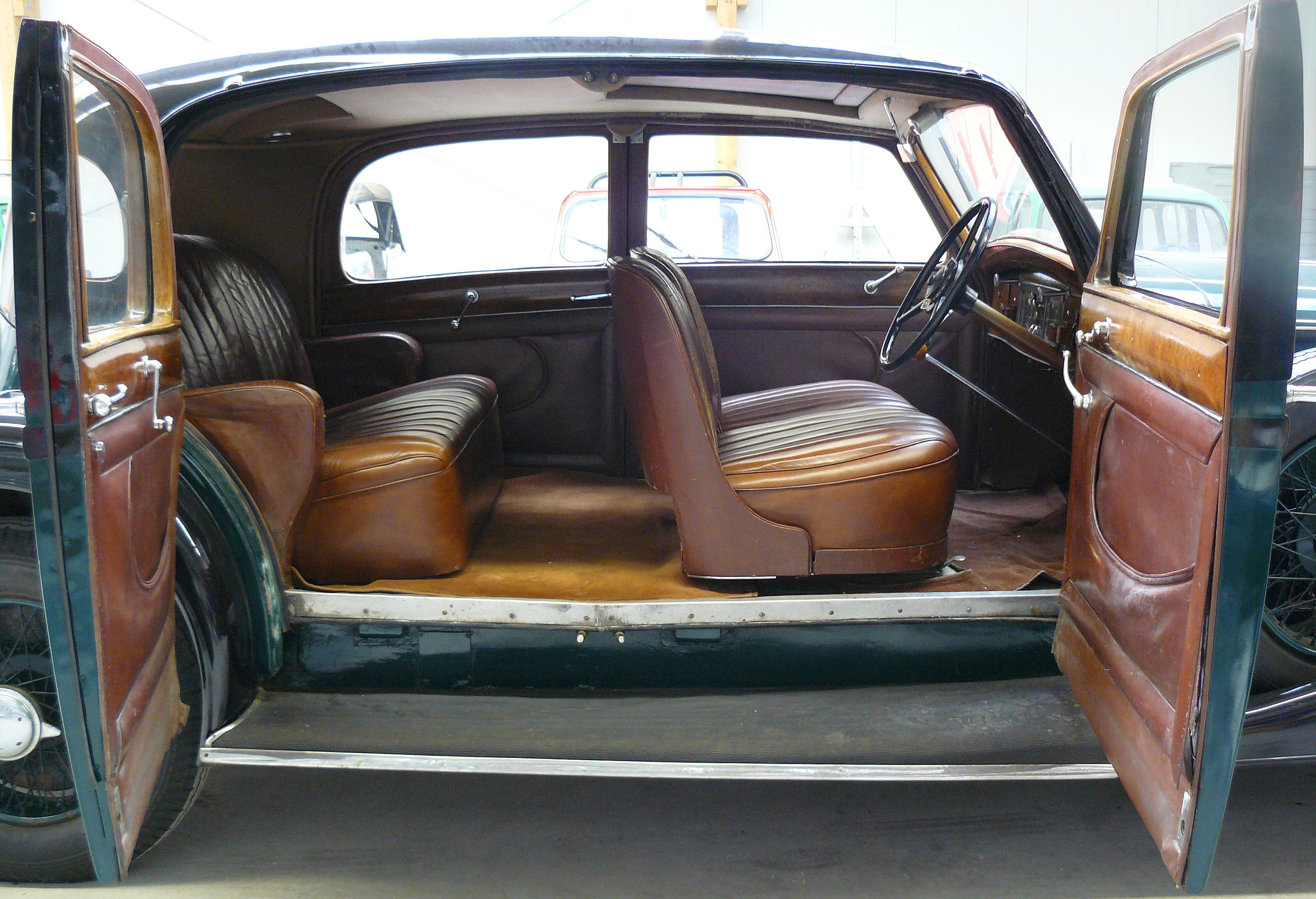
Hispano-Suiza K6 Vanvooren Pillarless Saloon. Pillarless saloon bodies were another feature patented by Vanvooren. This one dates from 1937.

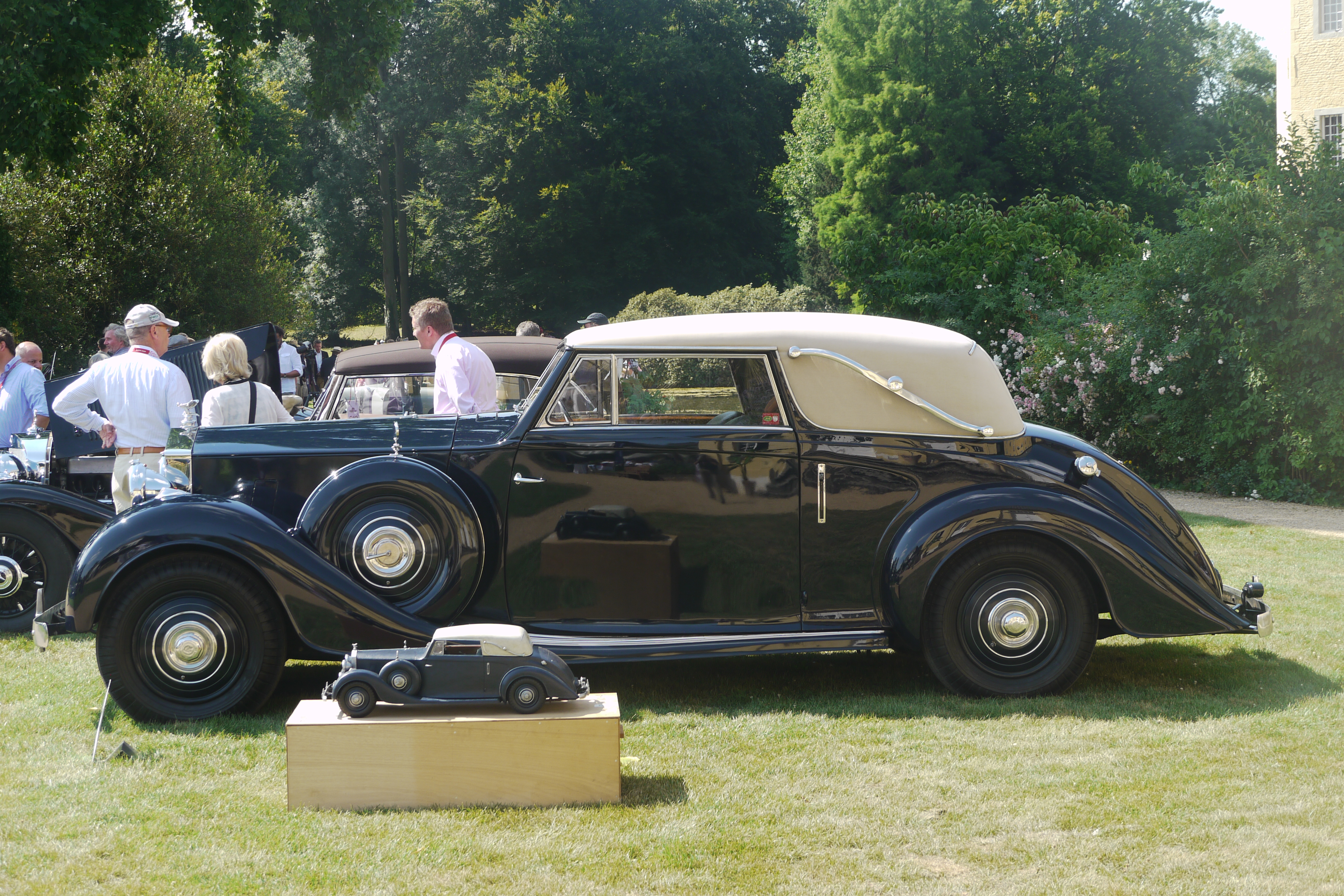
Rolls-Royce Wraith Faux Cabriolet with Vanvooren coachwork (1939)

Daste's car body building system became public at the Paris Motor Show in 1930 where it was identified as an important advance; more than 40 European carriage builders quickly acquired licenses to apply the Vanvooren/Daste patent. In the same year at the London Motor Show the company's British agent, J. Smith & Co., exhibited three car bodies of this type constructed on Delage chassis, all three finished in an eye-catching two tone silver/black colour scheme, and which made a big impression. In Britain patent marketing was handled by a company called "Silent Travel" and most of the major auto-makers purchased licenses.

Vanvooren caught the mood of the luxury car market in the 1930s, combining high quality standards with a careful combination of advanced style and conservative elegance.

==== Work with Hispano-Suiza ====
From the early years Vanvooren had worked closely with the luxury car maker Hispano-Suiza, whose French automobile factory was located in Bois-Colombes on the north-western edge of Paris, just a few hundred meters from Vanvooren's own factory. The fruitful collaboration between the two evolved during the 1930s into something comparable to the relationship developing at the same time in England between Rolls-Royce and Park Ward. In 1932 the collaborative nature of the relationship between the two businesses was further deepened when Marius Daste quit the top job at Vanvooren in order to take up an appointment as production direction with Hispano-Suiza. From 1932 Vanvooren provided the bodies for more than a third of Hispano-Suiza's output of HS26, K6 und J12 models.

==== Work with Bugatti ====
Romée de Prandières, previously Daste's partner at Vanvooren, stayed with the business and during the 1930s was able to build a close business relationship with Bugatti, helped by his personal friendship with the director of Bugatti's Paris agent, Dominique Lamberjack. Numerous Bugatti Types 43, 44, 46, 49, 50, 55 and 57 received their bodywork at Vanvooren's Courbevoie factory. The massive Type 46s bodied by Vanvooren included a strikingly designed body with which the model made its debut at the 1929 Paris Motor Show and Vanvooren also provided bodies for the Bugatti Type 50s which featured in the 24 Hours Le Mans race of 1931.

Vanvooren were also responsible for the bodies on approximately 20 Bugatti Type 57s, including four cabriolet bodied Type 57S models. At the end of the decade, in 1939, they were commissioned to provide coachwork for a unique Type 57 commissioned by the government as a wedding present for the future Shah of Iran, Mohammad Reza Pahlavi. This car was based on a design by Figoni & Falaschi intended originally for a Delahaye 165 chassis, and has a flamboyant style quite out of keeping with the restraint characteristic of Vanvooren's other work at this time.

==== Other French auto-makers ====
Other French leading manufacturers of luxury cars, notably Delage and Delahaye, also supplied chassis to be equipped with Vanvooren bodies. A project to move closer to the mass market sector by collaborating with Citroën collapsed after just a handful or prototypes had been built out of a planned minimum quota of 100 cars.

==== Working with Rolls-Royce ====
For Rolls-Royce and Bentley, virtually all the manufacturer's cars sold during the 1930s in France came with Vanvooren bodies. Again, commercial collaboration was underpinned by a personal relationship: Walter Sleator, who was in charge of "Franco-Britannic Autos", Rolls-Royce's French importer, had been Vanvooren's own sales director in their prestigious Rue Marbeuf Showroom back in the 1920s.

Rolls-Royce engineers were highly impressed by the Vanvooren's approach to design and production methodology. They decided to have a Bentley 3½ Litre (chassis number B187BL) fitted with a Vanvooren body featuring a pillarless sedan body, another Vanvooren patented speciality. The car body had no B-pillar, and the rear door hinges were at the rear edge of the doors, so that when both front and rear doors were opened the entire passenger area could be accessed without the encumbrance of a central pillar. The "Pillarless saloon" was subsequently made available to the leading British coach builders so that they could study it in detail.

Collaboration with Rolls-Royce also led to a cooperative relationship with their leading UK based car-body builder, Park Ward. Vanvooren were mandated to develop construction methods for the production of car bodies that were as far as possible light-weight and durable despite being made of steel. In connection with this contract Rolls-Royce commissioned four Vanvooren bodies for their 20/25 model, one for a "New Phantom", one for a Phantom II, three for Phantom IIIs and seven for Rolls-Royce Wraiths.

Vanvooren also collaborated extensively in respect of the company's Bentley chassis, with 69 Bentleys travelling to Paris to have bodies installed (16 3½ Litre cars, 46 4¼ Litre cars and 7 Bentley Mark Vs).

On the product development side collaboration with Bentley extended further during the closing years of the decade. The Bentley Mark V "Corniche" scheduled to succeed the Bentley 4¼ Litre in 1940, was developed by the Paris-based dentist and part-time car designer Georges Paulin, and it was intended that the standard bodies for the car would by produced by Vanvooren. A German invasion of France was widely foreseen, but its timing and the speed of France's military collapse had not been. At the time when France fell, seven Mark V "Corniche" chassis had been delivered from Derby to Vanvooren's Paris factory, and of these four had already received their bodywork. The prototype, identified by Chassis number 14-B-V was fully finished as was a second car, carrying chassis number B12AW. Car 14-B-V was badly damaged in an accident during testing in France, and while the body work went for repair at Châteauroux, in western central France where Rolls-Royce had been trialing the car, the chassis was sent back to the Rolls-Royce plant in Derby. Back in Derby a further six Mark V "Corniche" chassis were at this time under construction. It was planned that these would be fitted with a newly developed straight-8 engine and participate in the 1940 Le Mans 24 Hour race. That never happened; meanwhile, the now fully repaired body from the crashed prototype was sent back to the Rolls-Royce Derby plant in order to be reconnected with its chassis. However, on the dockside at Dieppe it was caught by a German air-raid and completely destroyed.

==== Other foreign auto-makers ====
One-off builds during the 1930s also included a Vanvooren sporting bodied Alfa Romeo 8C 2300 in 1933 and a Mercedes-Benz 500K sedan in 1934 (supplemented, according to one source, in 1936 by an equivalent body on a Mercedes-Benz 540K chassis). 1935 saw a Vanvooren body built for a Cadillac V8 cabriolet and another for an Alvis Speed 20 which the Coventry firm presented at the Paris Motor Show as an introduction of the Alvis brand to the French auto-market.

=== 1940 to 1950 ===
The production facilities at Corbevoie were badly damaged by bombing in 1943, and the company's written records were all destroyed. Contemporary technical information on cars produced before then survives only, if at all, in the records of manufacturers or customers ordering Vanvooren car bodies. After the war, in 1947, work resumed at the location, albeit on a much reduced scale.

The business environment for Europe's luxury car makers had changed fundamentally by the end of the Second World War. The principal auto-makers for whose cars Vanvooren had built bespoke bodies in the 1930s had either withdrawn completely from the car business, as was the case of Hispano-Suiza who were now focused on aircraft engines, or were beginning to offer customers complete cars, producing steel bodies themselves. That was the case with Rolls-Royce-Bentley whose Bentley Mark VI appeared in 1946, no doubt drawing on lessons supplied by Vanvooren's steel bodies supplied to Rolls-Royce in the 1930s.

France's own luxury auto-makers were much diminished financially by the grim economic conditions of the 1940s and by government policy which consciously discriminated against cars with engines above two-litres of capacity, using both taxation policy and a dirigiste approach to the allocation of steel. Vanvooren were restricted to a handful of special orders to provide new car bodies (including, notably, a special bodied Bentley Mk VI Coupé, identified by chassis number B332LEY) or rebuilding existing cars from before the war. But it was apparent that the business in which Vanvooren had specialized had virtually ceased to exist, and in 1950 operations came to an end at the Courbevoie factory.
