= Ards Circuit =

Motorsport street circuit in Dundonald, Northern Ireland

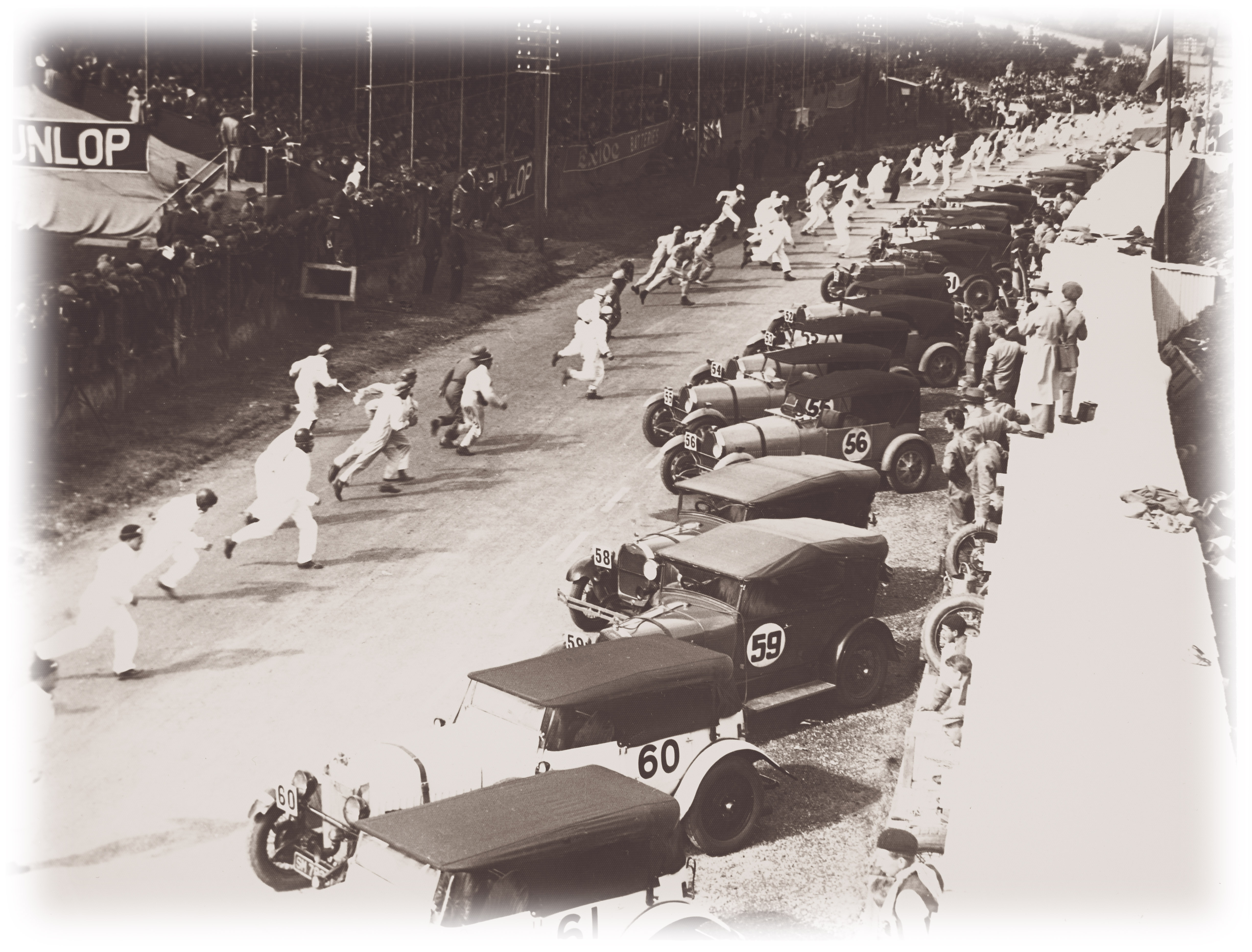
Start of the 1929 RAC Tourist Trophy at the Ards Circuit

The Ards Circuit was a motorsport street circuit in Northern Ireland used for RAC Tourist Trophy sports car races from 1928 until 1936, when eight spectators died in an accident. Industrialist and pioneer of the modern agricultural tractor, Harry Ferguson was instrumental in setting up the race. As Northern Ireland's premier sporting event, it regularly attracted crowds in excess of a quarter of a million people.

== Description ==
The triangular circuit 21.7 km (13.5 mi) long ran between the towns of Dundonald, Newtownards (known as Ards) and Comber in County Down, Northern Ireland. Races were run in a clockwise direction, starting at 11 am. Initially races were of 30 laps for a total distance of 652 km (405 mi); from 1933 races were of 35 laps for a total distance of 760 km (470 mi).

The entries were handicapped to cater for cars of different sizes and capabilities, and W. O. Bentley wrote that large cars could often be baulked by smaller "baby cars" on the winding sections so the circuit did not suit the larger Bentley or Rolls-Bentley cars. The only long straight stretch for high speeds was from Newtownards to Comber.

The circuit started at Dundonald at the Dundonald Hairpin, then past the R.A.C. Grandstand to the Quarry Corner. The Central Bar was a popular viewing point for the Dundonald Hairpin. At Dundonald the Carpark, Enclosure and Pits were near the R.A.C. Grandstand, and the pits were still visible until the 1960s. At Newtownards the right-angle Town Hall corner led to the Newtownards - Comber straight.

In 1936 with the race run in "shocking weather" and with contestants "spinning off the road in all directions" a local driver Jack Chambers skidded on the Newtownards railway bridge while approaching the Strangford Arms in Newtownards, demolishing a lamp post and mowing down a crowd standing against the wall. The driver (Chambers) was not seriously injured but eight spectators were killed, and the race was the last on the circuit after reactions that spectators should be adequately safeguarded.

== Rolls-Royce entries ==
In 1934 Edward Ramsden Hall a "competent and successful amateur racing driver" who had competed in the TT races of 1928, 1929, 1930, 1931, 1932 and 1933 on the Ards Circuit asked Rolls-Royce for support as a private entry in 1934. He had taken the Bentley 3½-Litre; to Italy for a Mille Miglia practice (to save his M.G. for the race itself ), and was impressed by its performance. It was the first new Bentley model or Derby Bentley after Rolls-Royce acquired Bentley in 1931, and was known as "the silent sports car". The company was initially reluctant, but Arthur Sidgreaves agreed and Rolls-Royce supplied a support team. Rowbotham thought the project "sheer lunacy" as a lone entry could be forced off the road by a works entry or a minor mechanical fault, and the Engineering Department knew nothing about racing (the last Rolls-Royce entries in a TT race were on the Isle of Man in 1905 and 1906 – winning in 1906). He would be responsible for the car, which was prepared in the factory and then a non-stop 12 hours endurance run; the power of the "slightly hotted-up engine" was increased from 114 bhp to 131 bhp.

Eddie Hall and his wife (who was his pit manager) were both worried about the car’s quietness and lack of drama or final adjustments before the race. A previous entry of theirs "had required four different types of sparking plug to keep it firing on its six cylinders". During the second pit stop one of the wheel nuts partially seized and the stop took 5½ minutes. Several smaller cars were on their third lap before the larger cars like the Bentley and the two Lagondas driven by Hon Brian Lewis and John Cobb started. There was a dramatic duel with Lewis’s Lagonda who passed Hall and took the lead when Hall slid on the road by the butcher’s shop in Comber; Hall, Lewis and Cobb ran in a pack for the first few laps, then Cobb fell behind.

After the race the team celebrated in Belfast, and Ernest Hives put in an expense account "To champagne – £45". Hall averaged 78.4 mph for the race with the best average speed of any entrant. He came second and 17 seconds behind to Dodson in a M.G. who won with a time of 6 hours, 13 minutes and 24 seconds. Hall had done "far better than I (Rowbotham) thought possible".

So Hall ran again in 1935, losing on handicap by 1 minute and 13 seconds to a Riley, and again the fastest time of the race with an average speed of 80.34 mph.

In 1936 Hall drove single-handed a Bentley with the larger 4¼-litre engine. In "shocking weather" he averaged 80.81 mph, again the highest speed. He was second on handicap, beaten by 26 seconds by Dodson & Dixon in a Riley. In the large class Hall was up against teams of three Lagondas and three Delahayes (which Rowbotham considered a semi-racing car as the very short Delahaye chassis could not carry a normal four-seater body). A Lagonda, the next big car, was almost nine minutes behind him. After 1936 the circuit was abandoned, to Rowbotham’s relief as he thought three entries with a lone car was "tempting fate to the limit ... a 100-1 chance".

The record of the highest average speed in all three races helped the Sales department, as some old Bentley customers doubted if the first "Derby Bentley ("the silent sports car") could out-perform its famous predecessors. He said it was easier to make a car go fast than to operate under all climate conditions for the average customer. Bentley's Continental testing required 25,000 road miles (incidentally providing free holiday transport e.g. to winter skiing at Davos!). They were finding, with increased cars on the road, that London traffic posed problems not disclosed by the Chateauroux trials, so they included two or three thousand miles of driving in London traffic. Typical problems were clutch troubles, plugs misfiring, or overheating from running the engine while standing in a traffic jam.

== Sources ==
- Rowbotham, William Arthur (1970). Silver Ghosts and Silver Dawn. London: Constable.
- Bird, Anthony; Hallows, Ian (1984). The Rolls-Royce Motor Car and the Bentley since 1931. London: B.T. Batsford. ISBN 0-7134-4515-7. (5th edition, 1st edition 1964)
