= Eddie Hall (racing driver) =

British racing driver (1900–1982)

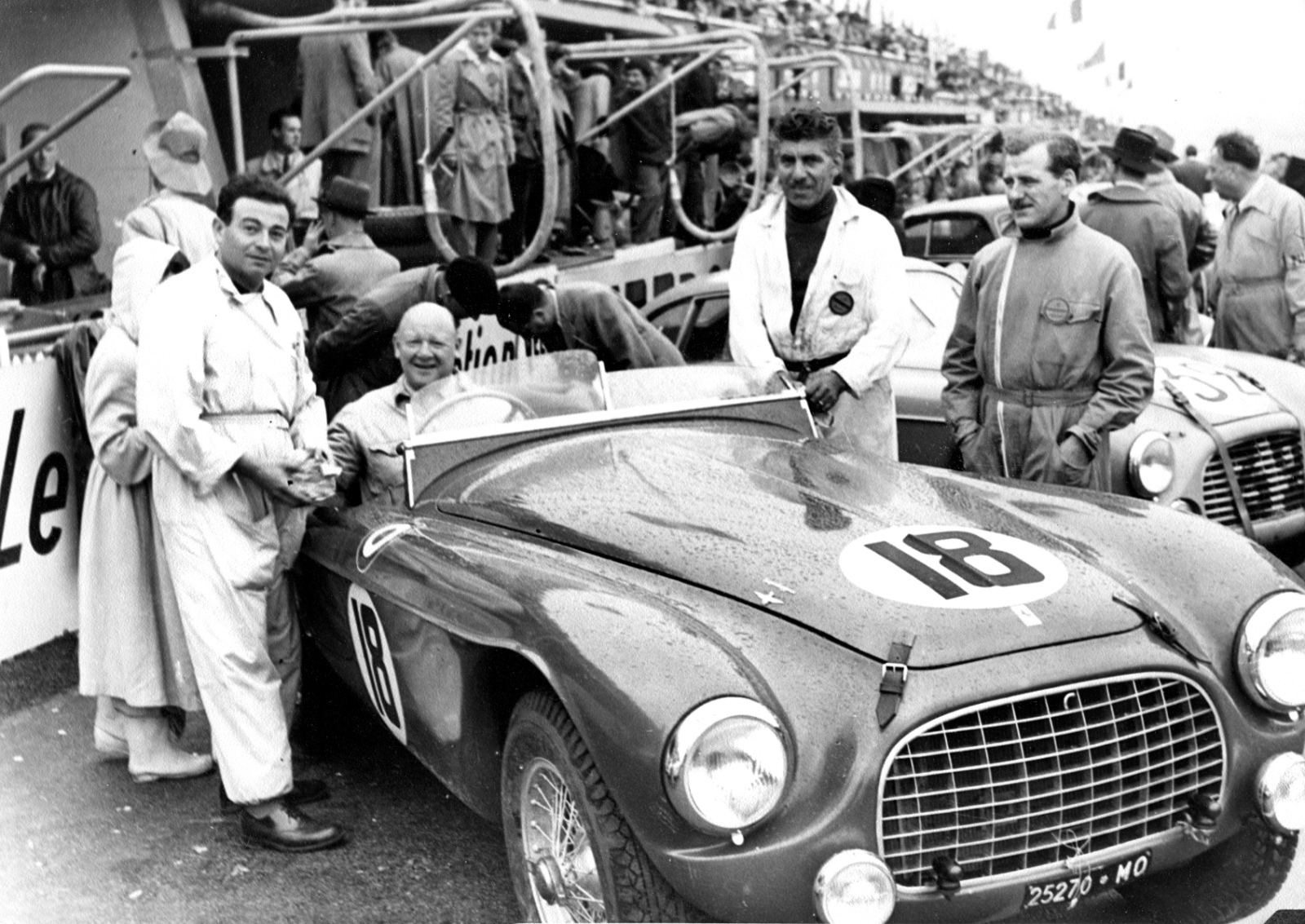
- Hall in the Ferrari 340 America at Le Mans on 23 June 1951
- Nationality: (United Kingdom) British
- Full name: Edward Ramsden Hall
- Born: 17 July 1900
- Died: 12 May 1982 (aged 81)

Edward Ramsden Hall (17 July 1900 – 12 May 1982) was an English racing driver. He was born in Milnsbridge into a wealthy Yorkshire family in 1900, the heir to a successful textiles business which funded his motor racing and other sporting exploits.

He is famous for being the only driver to successfully complete the full 24 hours of the 24 Hours of Le Mans race solo, a feat he achieved in 1950. He lived at Kirkburton, near Huddersfield until leaving the United Kingdom on his retirement in the early 1950s to live, initially in South Africa, later in Canada and then Monte Carlo, where he had an apartment overlooking the harbour and part of the Grand Prix circuit.

He was married twice, first to Evelyn Muriel (divorced in 1931) and secondly in 1933 to divorcée Joan Evelyn Quarmby (née Goddard) who survived him on his death in 1982.

== Racing career ==
Hall started motor racing in 1922 and was a prolific amateur competitor at many venues including Donington Park, Shelsley Walsh, the Isle of Man and the Mille Miglia until his retirement in 1951. He favoured races that demanded stamina and is mostly remembered today for his multiple drives in the 410-mile (478 from 1933) RAC Tourist Trophy on the (Ards Circuit) in Ulster, where he competed every year it was held there (1928 to 1936). In 1960, he presented a perpetual trophy to the B.A.R.C. for the annual winner of their Formula Junior Championship (later Formula 3).

=== Ards TT ===
The Ards TT was brought to Ireland by industrialist and pioneer of the modern agricultural tractor, Harry Ferguson, and was the largest sporting event in the area at the time, regularly attracting more than quarter of a million spectators. It took place on the Ards Circuit a closed road circuit encompassing Newtownards, Comber and Dundonald in County Down, Northern Ireland. Like many others at the time it was run on a handicap basis so that cars of very different sizes and performances were able to compete in the same race, which although difficult for spectators to follow during the race did provide some close finishes. In Hall's first TT race in 1928, he drove a 2-litre Lagonda 14/60 Speed model, which ran out of oil and seized causing his retirement from the race just a few laps from the end. In the 1929 race he fared no better, crashing his supercharged Arrol-Aster 17/50 into Ards town hall. 1930 saw him driving an unsupercharged Bentley 4½ Litre and finishing the race for the first time, second in class and twelfth overall. In 1931 he drove a supercharged 746cc MG Midget, again retiring with engine failure, but in the 1932 race in the same model of car he finished first in class and third overall. His performance in 1933 in a supercharged MG K3 Magnette was similar, achieving second in class and fourth overall in a race won by Tazio Nuvolari.

For 1934 Hall asked Rolls-Royce to modify a Bentley 3½-litre, which they initially refused to do because the company had long since quit racing. Reasoning that as this car was a private entry failure would not reflect badly on the factory, and Rolls-Royce assisted Hall by increasing the output of his engine from the standard 114 bhp to a more useful 131 bhp. His wife was his "very efficient" pit manager (although a private entry, Rolls-Royce supplied a support team) and in 1934 the Halls were both worried about the car's quietness and lack of drama or final adjustments before the race (the model was known as the "silent sports car"; the entry had been prepared in the factory, with a non-stop 12 hours endurance run for the "slightly hotted-up engine"). A previous entry of theirs "had required four different types of sparking plug to keep it firing on its six cylinders". Hall came second, and after the race the team celebrated in Belfast, and Ernest Hives put in a simple expense account claim "To champagne – £45".

The car was the first competition car built at Rolls-Royce since the car built for Charles Rolls which he had driven to win the 1906 TT, and it was also their last. The heavy Bentley was not ideally suited to the tricky street circuit at Ards, but when the series came to an end in 1936 Hall had accumulated 3 second places in it (1934, 1935 and 1936), each time setting the fastest race pace (78.40 mph, 80.36 mph and 80.81 mph respectively), and each time defeated only by the handicap system. The final version of the car had a 4¼-litre engine producing over 160 bhp and a 40-gallon fuel tank behind the seats, enabling him to complete the distance without stopping. He was one of only two men to have competed in every running of the Ards TT, the other being Earl Howe.

=== BRDC ===
Hall was elected to the British Racing Drivers' Club (BRDC) in 1932 and was awarded their Gold Star in 1933 for his performance at Brooklands when he raced the BRDC 500 Mile Race in a Bentley 4½ Litre, partnered by Dr D.J. Benjafield, and came second on handicap. Theirs was the fastest car in the race, at 112.12 mph.

In the BRDC 500 at Brooklands in 1933, Hall drove a works MG K3 Magnette with streamlined bodywork and with his then girlfriend (later second wife), Joan, acting as team Manager and controlling the race from the pits. Together they worked out a novel method of pit control, combining steady driving (calculated to enable the car to outlast its competitors) with a single efficiently-managed pitstop, and these two factors together allowed him to take a famous victory.

=== Le Mans ===
Hall had entered the 4¼-litre Bentley into the Le Mans 24-hour race in 1936, but the race was cancelled due to economic conditions and labour difficulties. There was a swansong performance for that car, however, when Hall drove it in the second post-war Le Mans 24-hour race in 1950, becoming the first (and only) man to drive solo for the entire distance, despite having a co-driver in the pits ready to take over. He completed 236 laps, which equals to nearly 3,200 km (2,000 miles). When asked by Denis Jenkinson what the toilet arrangements were if he never left the cockpit for 24 hours, Hall replied "Green overalls, old boy!"

His final international event was in the 1951 Le Mans race, driving a 4.1-litre Ferrari 340 America Barchetta. He completed 125 laps before being forced to retire with electrical problems.

== Photography ==
Hall was also a photographer and published a book on the subject of Modern Figure Skating in 1938. The photographic plates consist of action shots of skaters (taken during the European Figure Skating Championships in St Moritz), and a combination of formal and impromptu portraits. T.D. Richardson, author of Modern Figure Skating and Ice Rink Skating, wrote in the introduction to Hall's book "it was highly entertaining to see Mr Hall laden with cameras and gadgets, prowling round the rinks, stalking his prey in the hope of catching a new or unusual angle or lying flat on his tummy for hours, so that he might get a single shot. Young skaters are often possessed of 'temperaments', but Mr Hall's patience and good humour overcame all difficulties."

== Bobsleigh ==
Hall was a member of the victorious Great Britain two-man and five-man bobsleigh crews at the 1927 European Bobsleigh Championship in St. Moritz, and also contested the 1928 Winter Olympics in the Number 2 Great Britain five-man bobsleigh, finishing ninth overall and ahead of the Number 1 Great Britain team.
