= Bentley Mark V =

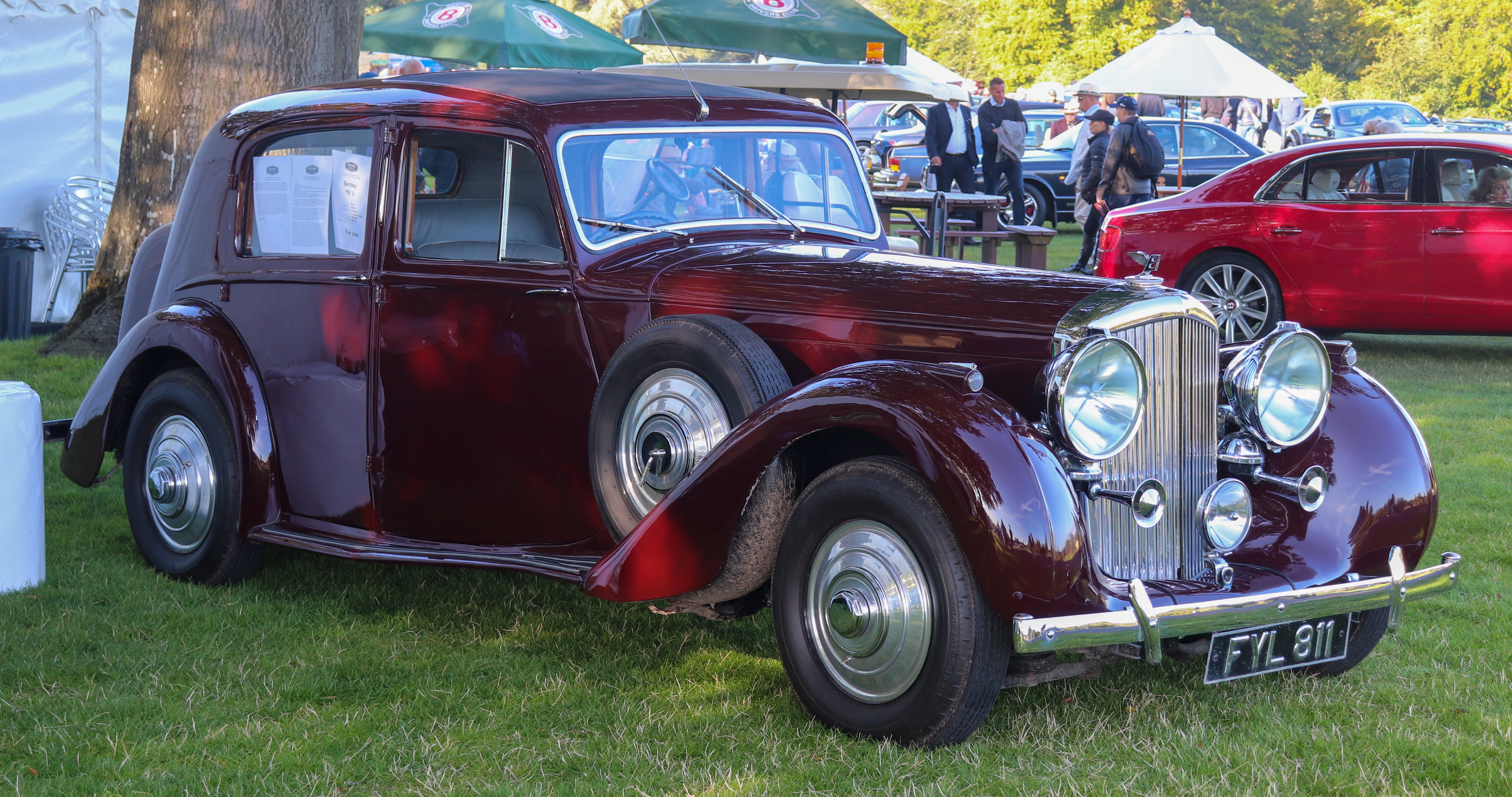

Overview
- Manufacturer: Bentley Motors Limited (1931)
- Production: 1939–1941; 11 produced
- Assembly: United Kingdom: Derby, England (chassis only)

Body and chassis
- Class: Full-size luxury car
- Body style: Chassis provided, customer to select own coachbuilder and body style
- Layout: FR layout

Powertrain
- Engine: 4¼ L (4,257 cc) I6
- Transmission: 4-speed manual

Dimensions
- Wheelbase: 10'4" 124 in (315 cm)
- Length: bumpers with chassis
- Width: bumpers with chassis

Chronology
- Predecessor: Bentley 4¼ Litre
- Successor: Bentley Mark VI

The Bentley Mark V was Rolls-Royce's second Bentley model. Intended for announcement at the Earl's Court Motor Show set down for late October 1939 it had much in common with its predecessor. War was declared on 3 September 1939 and a few days later Bentley announced it had ceased production of civilian items.

The Mark V was sold only as a bare chassis to be fitted with a body from an owner's own choice of coachbuilder. It proved to be the last Derby Bentley; after the war production moved to Crewe.

== Chassis ==
It was a new design with very deep side rails to reduce flexing and to cope with the changed loads resulting from a totally redesigned independent front suspension in place of the beam axle.

== Engine ==
Essentially the same as the Bentley 4¼ which it replaced, but with the number of timing gears reduced. See: The Rolls-Royce Motor-Car, Anthony Bird and Ian Hallows, B. T. Batsford, London 1972 page 282. Without a beam axle the engine could be mounted further forward and particular care was taken to mount it so as to minimise noise and vibration to the passengers. The engine displaced 4¼-litres (4257 cc/259 in³) with an 88.9 mm (3.5 in) bore and 114.3 mm (4.5 in) stroke.

== Gearbox ==
Synchromesh was provided on all ratios but first and reverse. Previously it had been provided on just third and fourth speeds. This proved a very welcome refinement adding greatly to the pleasure of driving the car. The gear change lever was moved backwards closer to the driver by the seat squab, cutting back on the chances of finding cold steel up the trouser leg as the driver tried to get in or out. The clutch employed an improved design. A new divided transmission shaft eased potential vibration problems.

== Suspension ==
This was the first Bentley to dispense with a leaf-sprung front beam axle. It followed Rolls-Royce's lead from 1938 and instead used a new design of independent front suspension in its completely new chassis. Low rate open coil springs sat within pairs of triangulated wishbones holding the front wheels at their outer point. The upper wishbones acted on a piston-type hydraulic damper, the arms at the bottom were set wide apart so that the rearward one could act as a torque member under braking. These assemblies on each side were linked by a strong anti-roll bar.

== Brakes ==
By Girling using Rolls-Royce's mechanical servo assistance. 57% of the effort was now applied to the front of the car.

== Production ==
Thirty five MK V Chassis were manufactured numbered B-2-AW through to B-70-AW with even numbers only being used. Eighteen chassis were scrapped.

- Mark V: seventeen cars completed (seven cars remain).
- Corniche MK V: One car completed. The chassis number given was 14-BV. A lighter gauge steel was used to save weight.

== Designation Mark V ==
Some consider Marks I, II and III to have been Rolls-Royce development vehicles and therefore Mark IV the first Derby 3½-litre and 4¼-litre Bentleys. Mark V follows naturally from that but Mark VI became the last.

== Experimental department ==
A lightweight and aerodynamic Corniche model was planned, but the outbreak of World War II halted development work and the concept finally emerged more than a decade later as the Bentley Continental in 1952. Weight was critical, tyre designs of the day could not safely support bigger cars at the continuous high speeds then becoming achievable on the Continent's new motorways. This first 4-door sports saloon had a body designed by Georges Paulin and built by Vanvooren of Paris. While in France it was seriously damaged when rolled-over. Left on the quayside at Dieppe it is believed it was destroyed by bombing though the chassis may have returned to Derby. A copy of this car is currently being recreated by the Rolls-Royce Heritage Trust in Derby. A special streamlined mascot was designed by Georges Paulin after being commissioned by Alex Harvey Bailey. A photograph of the original car may be seen through an external link -see below.

== Gallery ==
Chassis B-24-AW

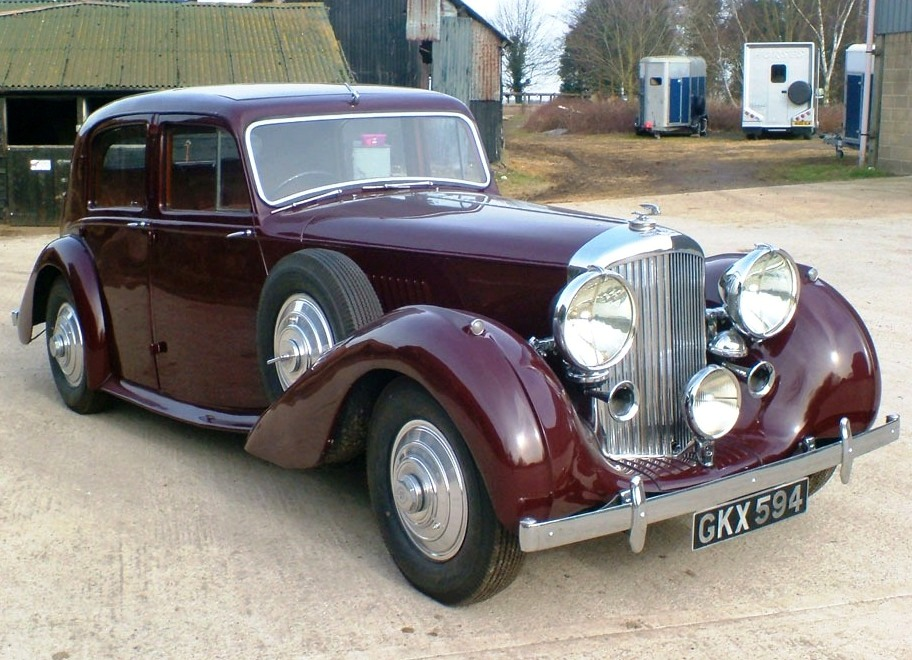

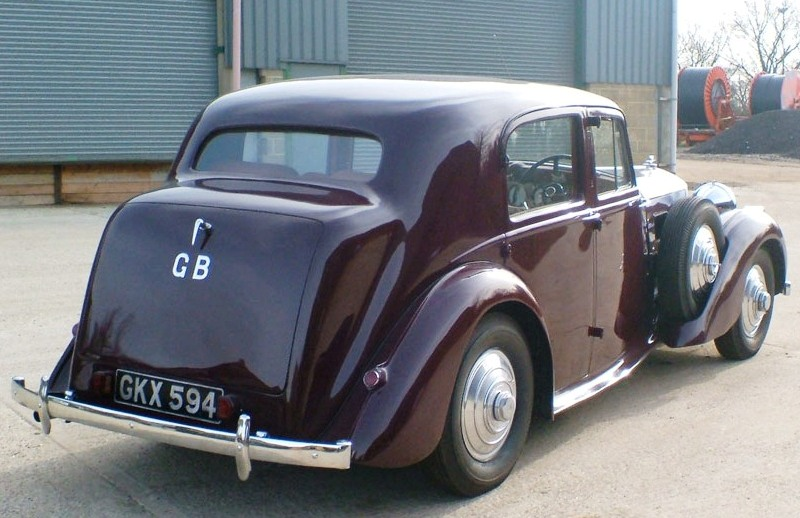

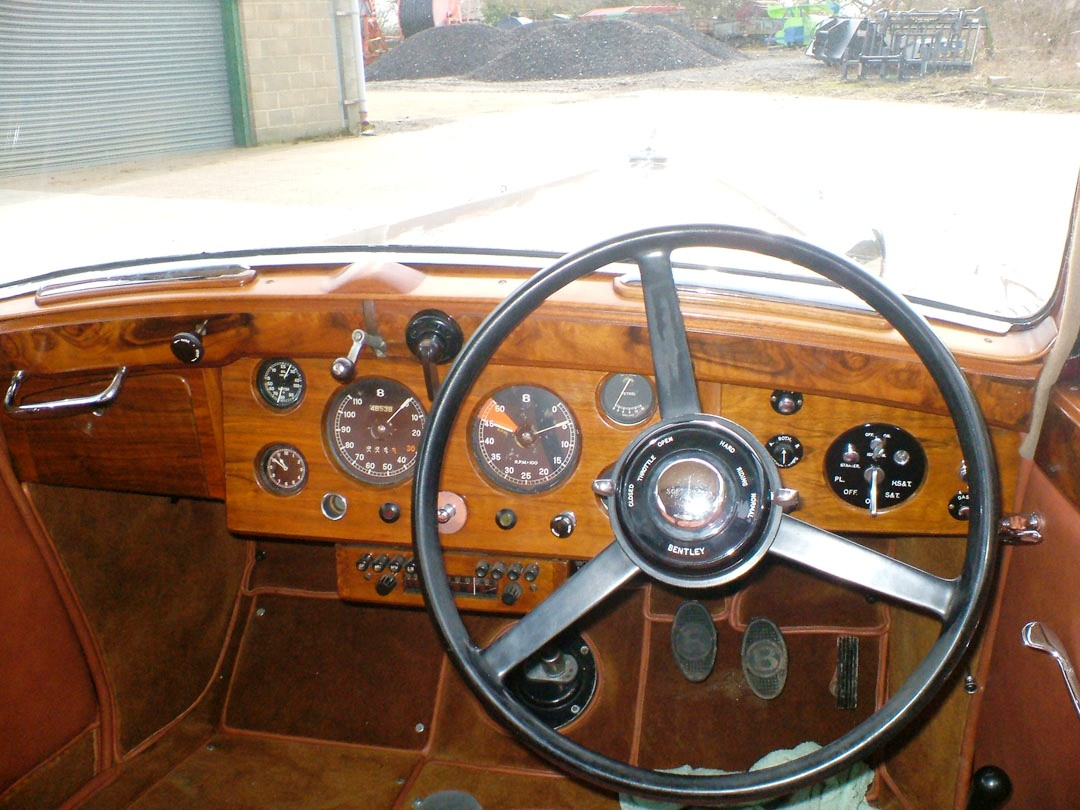

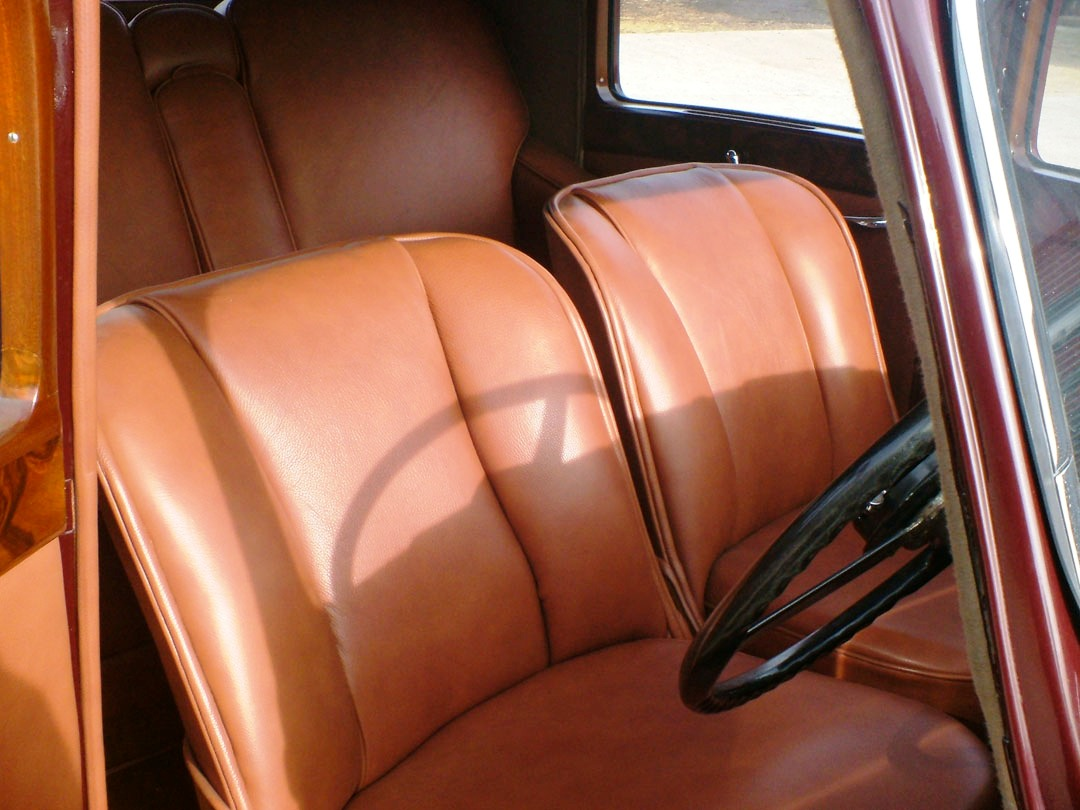
