= Figoni et Falaschi =

French coachbuilder firm company

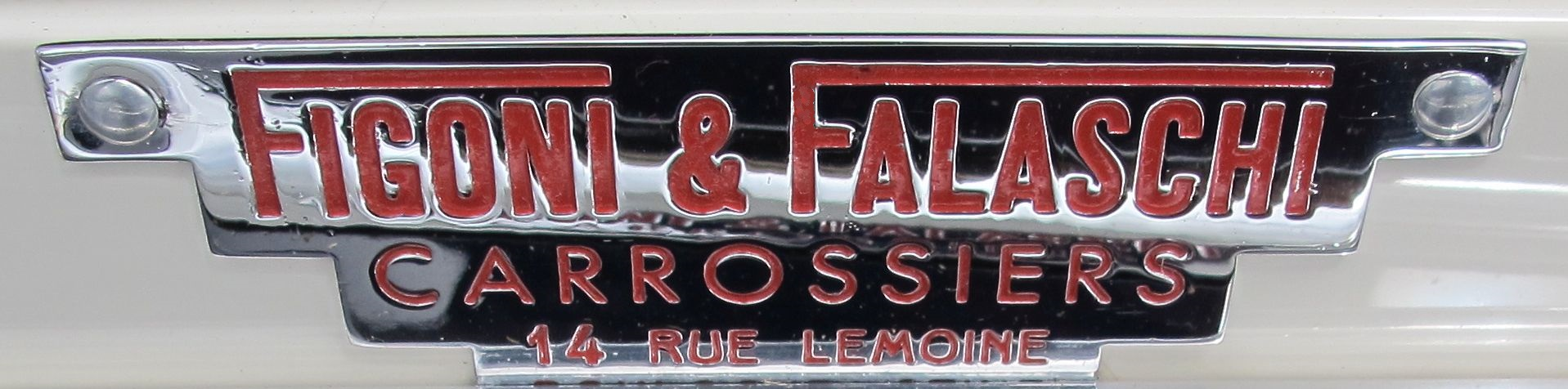
- Industry: Automotive
- Founded: 1935, Paris France
- Founders: Giuseppe Figoni & Ovidio Falaschi
- Headquarters: Paris, France
- Services: automotive design, coachbuilding

Figoni et Falaschi is a French luxury brand and coachbuilder firm which was active from 1935 through to the 1950s. The designs were created by Giuseppe Figoni, while his partner Ovidio Falaschi ran the business.

== Early history: Figoni ==
Giuseppe Figoni was born in 1894 in Farini, Italy. When he was young, his family moved to Paris, France, where at age 14 he was apprenticed to a carriage builder until he left to fight in World War I. Upon his return, he became the owner of Carrosserie Automobilie in Boulogne-sur-Seine, where he developed a reputation for attractive and functional coachwork. By 1925 he was building bespoke bodies on a variety of chassis, including Delahaye, Bugatti, Renault, Delage, Panhard and Alfa Romeo, using the trademark Figoni. He also designed aerodynamic bodies for race cars, including the Alfa Romeo 8C 2300 Le Mans type which won the 1932 through 1934 24 Hours of Le Mans, and the Delahaye Type 138 18CV Speciale which set a 48-hour endurance record at Montlhery in 1934. However, his designs during this period were still conventional, compared to the distinctive style he would develop as part of Figoni et Falaschi.

In 1935, Figoni took on as partner Italian businessman Ovidio Falaschi, forming Figoni et Falaschi. Falaschi's ability to handle the finances and management of the partnership enabled Figoni to concentrate on his designs, which became emblematic of the spirit of the period.

In 1936, Figoni et Falaschi's Delahaye 135 coupe, commissioned by French racing driver Albert Perrot, was shown at the Mondial de l'Automobile by the Comtesse de la Saint Amour de Chanaz, to great acclaim. This was followed by the Talbot-Lago T150C SS Teardrop Coupe, commissioned by Antonio Lago as part of his resurrection of the Talbot marque. One of these cars, owned by Brooks Stevens, sold for $3,535,000 at Christie's Pebble Beach Concours d'Elegance auction in August 2005, another for $3,905,000 at the Palm Beach International Concours d'Elegance Gooding & Company auction in January 2006 where it was unanimously voted "Best in Show", and another for $4,620,000 at the Pebble Beach Concours d'Elegance RM Auctions Sports & Classics of Monterey auction in August 2010.

A selection of body designs by Figoni et Falaschi

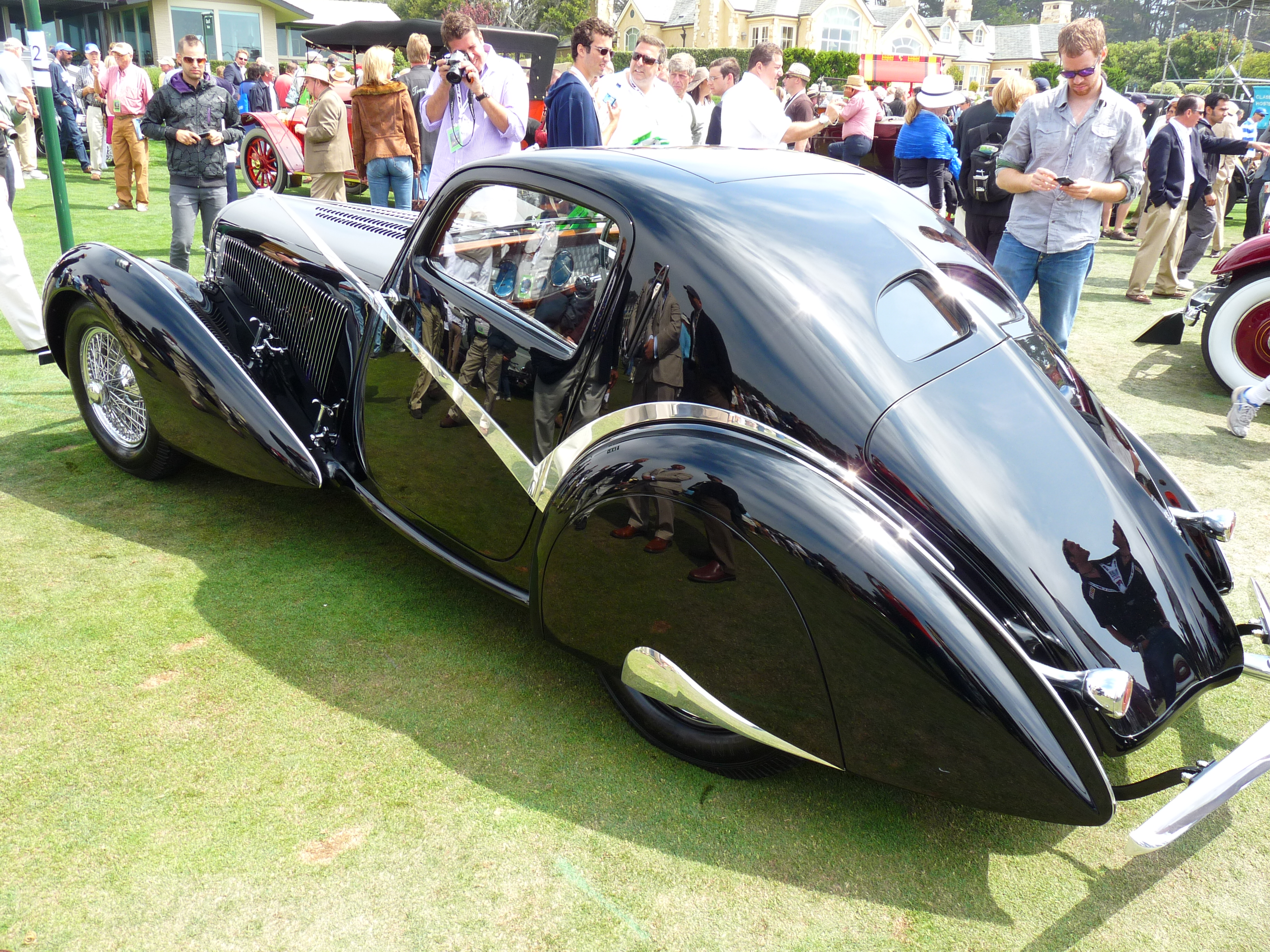
1936 Delahaye 135 Competition Coupe

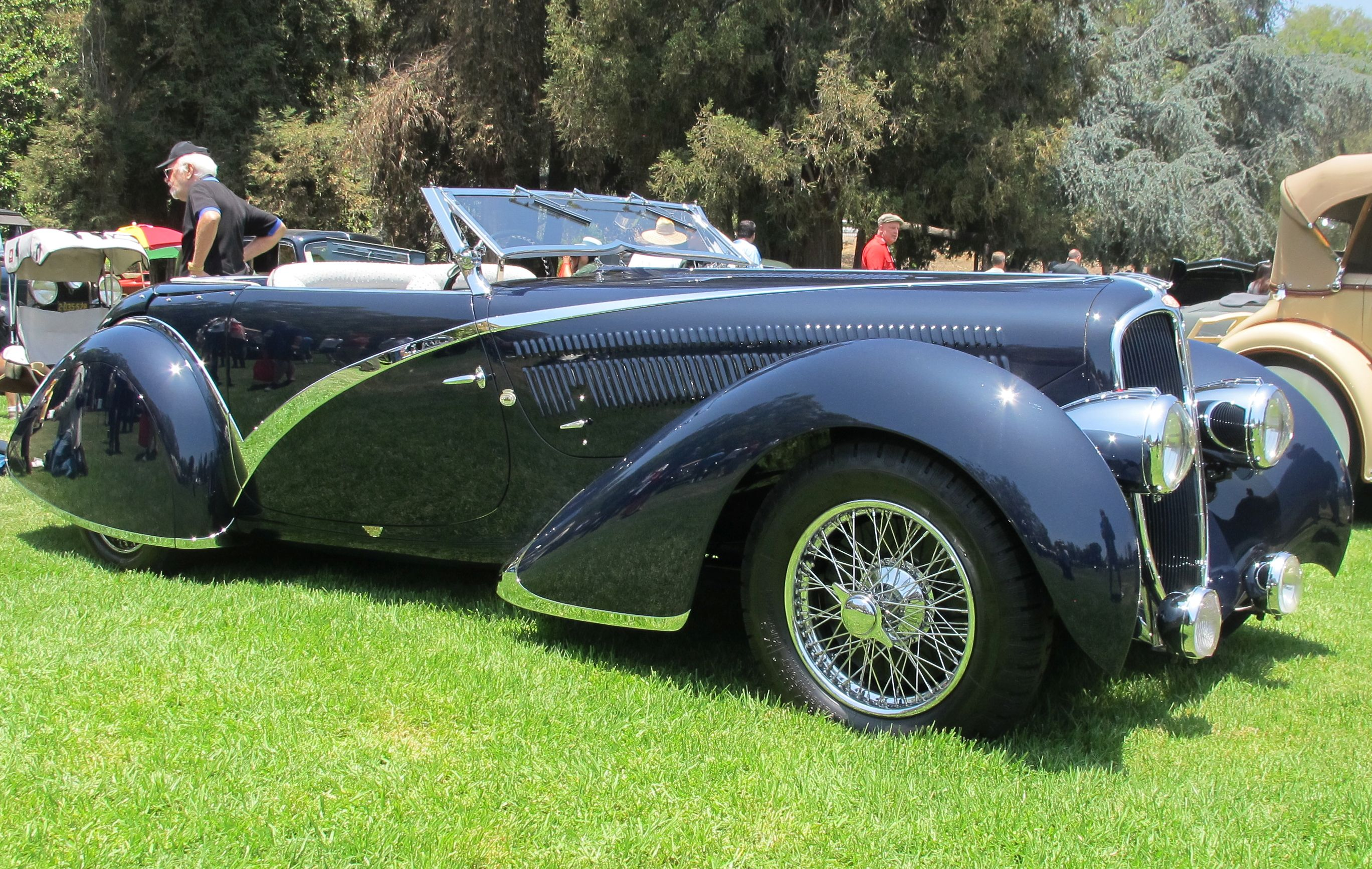
1936 Delahaye 135 Disappearing Top Convertible

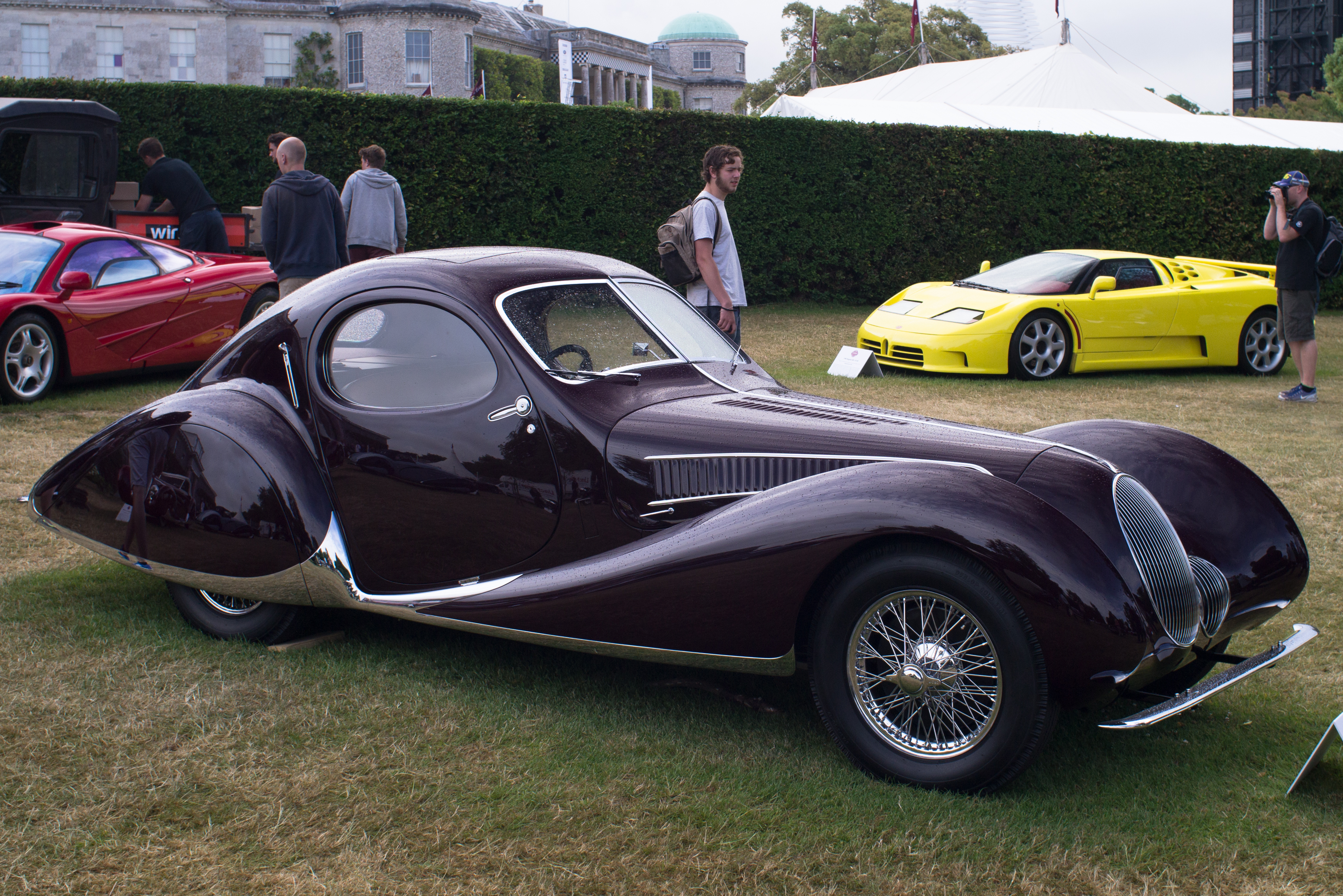
1937 Talbot-Lago T150 SS Teardrop Coupe

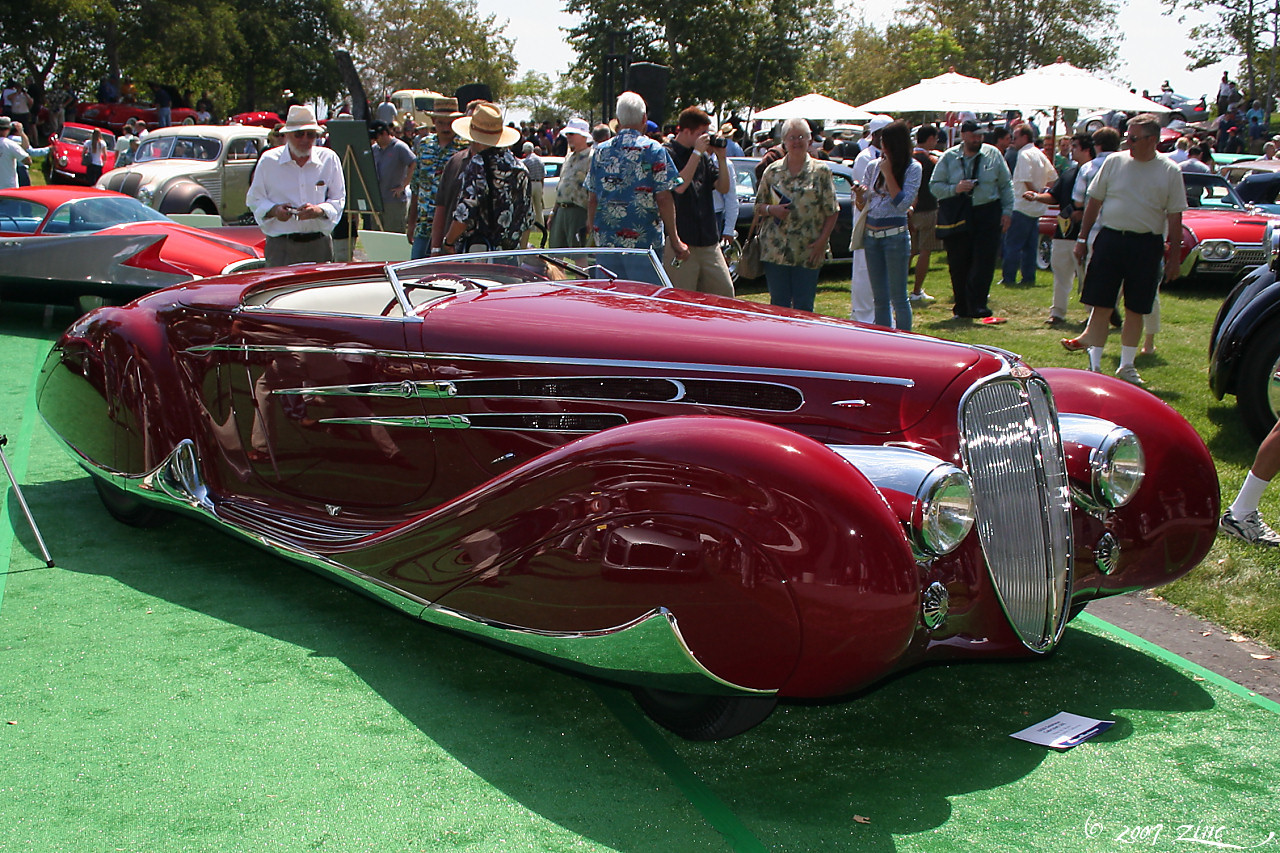
1939 Delahaye Type 165

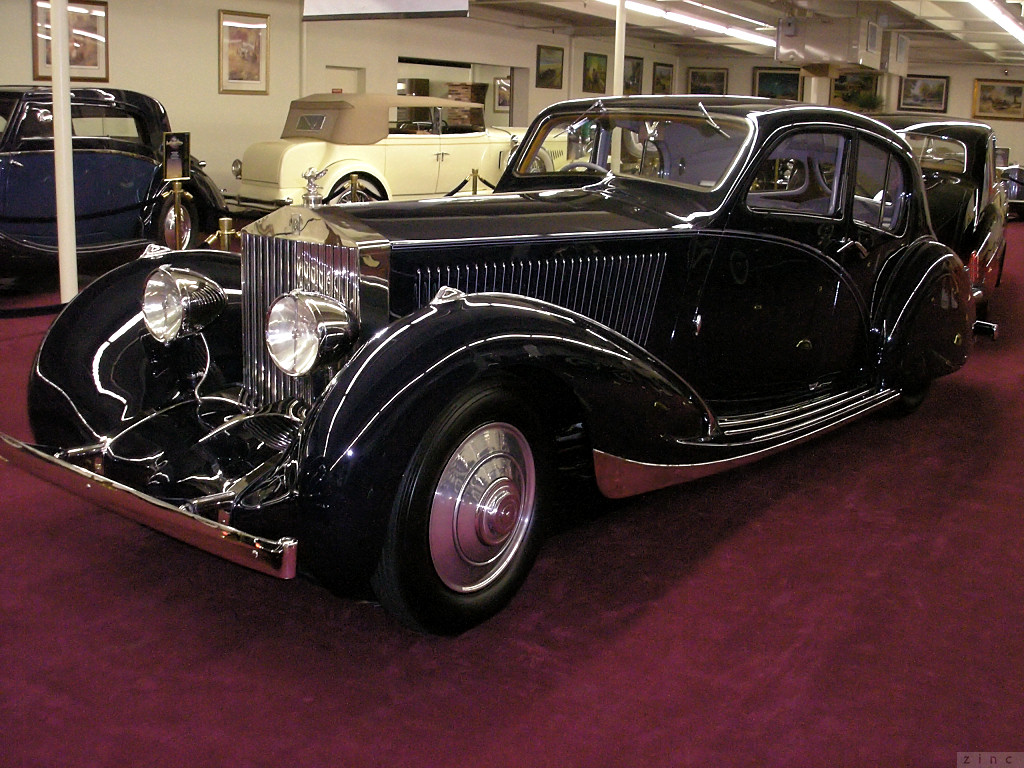
1932 Rolls-Royce Phantom II Continental Pillarless Berline

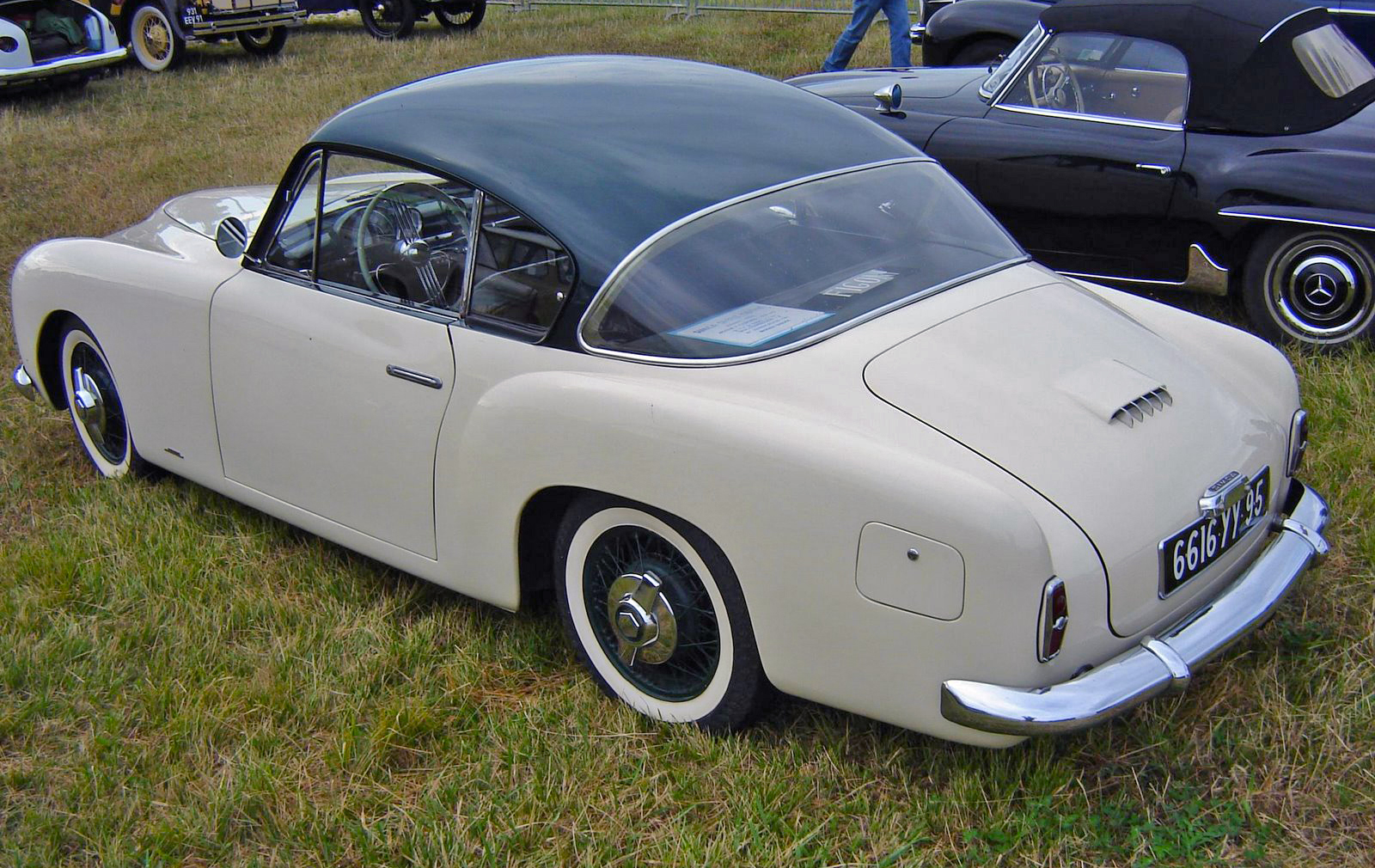
1954 Simca 9 Sport

=== Design features ===
Typical of the era, Figoni was heavily influenced by the advances in aircraft design and aerodynamics, resulting in the distinctive Italian style of goccia d'acqua goutte d'eau (tear-drop) elliptical silhouettes and enveloppantes (tear-drop shaped pontoon fenders) which gave his designs their characteristic fluid grace and inherent motion. In the pursuit of both aerodynamic form and function, he utilized fender skirts to fill not only the rear wheel openings, but often those in the front fenders as well. Windshields were steeply raked back and headlights, door handles, etc. were fitted flush to the body. Figoni designed and patented hideaway tops and sunroofs, so that his roadsters and drophead coupes would not be cluttered by a folded top. Chrome hood ornaments and mouldings echoed the streamlined, windswept design.

Figoni used nitrocellulose lacquers to paint his cars in brilliant and metallic colours, often two or three colours in designs which flowed with the body lines. Dashboards made of rich, golden wood were a Figoni et Falaschi signature.

Figoni et Falaschi also became known for coordinating with Paris couturiers, so that their cars were often presented at auto shows and concours d'elegance together with models wearing ensembles and fashion accessories which matched the car in style and color. Ovidio Falaschi is quoted as viewing the firm as "true couturiers of automotive coachwork, dressing and undressing a chassis one, two, three times and even more before arriving at the definitive line that we wanted to give to a specific chassis-coachwork ensemble." According to prewar French automobile expert and restorer Ricardo Adatto, for Figoni et Falaschi to finish a complete body required 2,100 hours.

== See also ==
- Streamline Moderne
