= Goutte d'eau =

Single by Ninho

from the album Destin
- Language: French
- Released: 23 February 2019
- Length: 2:51
- Label: Parlophone Records, Rec. 118
- Songwriters: Ninho; Kozbeat
- Producer: Kozbeat

Ninho singles chronology
"Binks to Binks 6" (2019)	"Goutte d'eau" (2019)	"Paris c'est magique" (2019)

Music video
- "Goutte d'eau" on YouTube

"Goutte d'eau" is a song by Ninho released. It was released on 23 February 2019 and peaked at number-one on the French Singles Chart. The song peaked at number three in Belgium. The name refers to 'drops of gold' in heraldry.

== Charts ==
=== Weekly charts ===
Weekly chart performance for "Goutte d'eau"
Chart (2019)	Peak position
Belgium (Ultratop 50 Wallonia)	3
France (SNEP)	1
Switzerland (Schweizer Hitparade)	26

=== Year-end charts ===
Year-end chart performance for "Goutte d'eau"
Chart (2019)	Position
Belgium (Ultratop Wallonia)	68
France (SNEP)	10
Chart (2020)	Position
France (SNEP)	97
Chart (2021)	Position
France (SNEP)	121

== Certifications ==
Region	Certification	Certified units/sales
France (SNEP)	Diamond	333,333^{‡}
^{‡} Sales+streaming figures based on certification alone.
