= T49 =

T49 may refer to:

== Aircraft ==
- Boeing CT-49, an American trainer
- Slingsby T.49 Capstan, a British glider
- Sukhoi T-49, a prototype Soviet fighter
- Wright T49, a turboprop engine

== Other uses ==
- Cooper T49, a British racing car
- Hispano-Suiza T49, a Spanish automobile
- 90mm Gun Tank T49, a variant of the M41 Walker Bulldog light tank
