= Hispano-Suiza =

Automotive, engine, and armament manufacturer

Hispano Suiza
- Industry: Manufacturing
- Founded: June 14, 1904; 122 years ago
- Founders: Marc Birkigt; Damián Mateu; Francisco Seix
- Fate: Aviation: now part of Safran; Automobiles: active as part of the Peralada Group
- Headquarters: Barcelona, Catalonia, Spain
- Key people: Miguel Suqué Mateu (President), Sergio Martinez Campos (CEO), Juan Fernandez (CTO), Francesc Arenas (Head of Design), Victor Cobos (CMO)
- Products: Automobiles, formerly also aviation components
- Parent: Grup Peralada
- Website: hispanosuizacars.com

Hispano-Suiza (Spanish for 'Spanish-Swiss') is a Spanish automotive company. It was founded in 1904 by Marc Birkigt and Damián Mateu as an automobile manufacturer and by the 1930s had several factories in Spain and one in France that produced luxury cars, aircraft engines, trucks and weapons.

In 1923, its French luxury car arm became a semi-autonomous partnership with the Spanish parent company. In 1937, the French arm was taken over by the French state for war production and after World War II continued as an independent aviation engine and components manufacturer under the Hispano-Suiza name. In 1968, the company was taken over by the aerospace company Snecma, which is now part of the French Safran Group. Meanwhile, during the Spanish Civil War, Hispano-Suiza's Spanish factories in Barcelona and Seville were taken over by both sides for war production. In 1946, its Spanish assets were taken over by the truck manufacturer ENASA.

Hispano Suiza Cars in Spain was relaunched by the same founding family (4th generation of the Suqué Mateu Family); the company is part of the Peralada Group that is also owned by the Suqué Mateu family. It reemerged in 2019 with a fully-electric 1,119 HP hypercar, the Hispano-Suiza Carmen.

== History ==
=== Early years ===
In 1898, a Spanish artillery captain, Emilio de la Cuadra Albiol, started electric automobile production in Barcelona under the name of La Cuadra. In Paris, Emilio de la Cuadra met the Swiss engineer Marc Birkigt and hired him to work for the company in Spain. Under his direction, two types of La Cuadra gasoline-powered engine cars were started immediately, one equipped with a 4.5 hp single-cylinder explosion engine and another 1.1-litre two-cylinder model, 7.5 hp. In 1900, these two internal combustion engines were the first designed and built in Spain by La Cuadra from a Birkigt design. These cars had four wheels, the previous two directional, clutch mechanisms, 3-speed gearbox, chain drive and suspension by crossbows. Two complete vehicles were completed, and there were some more under construction. At some point in 1902, the ownership changed hands to José María Castro Fernández and became Fábrica Hispano-Suiza de Automóviles (Spanish for 'Spanish-Swiss Automobile Factory'), but this company went bankrupt in December 1903.

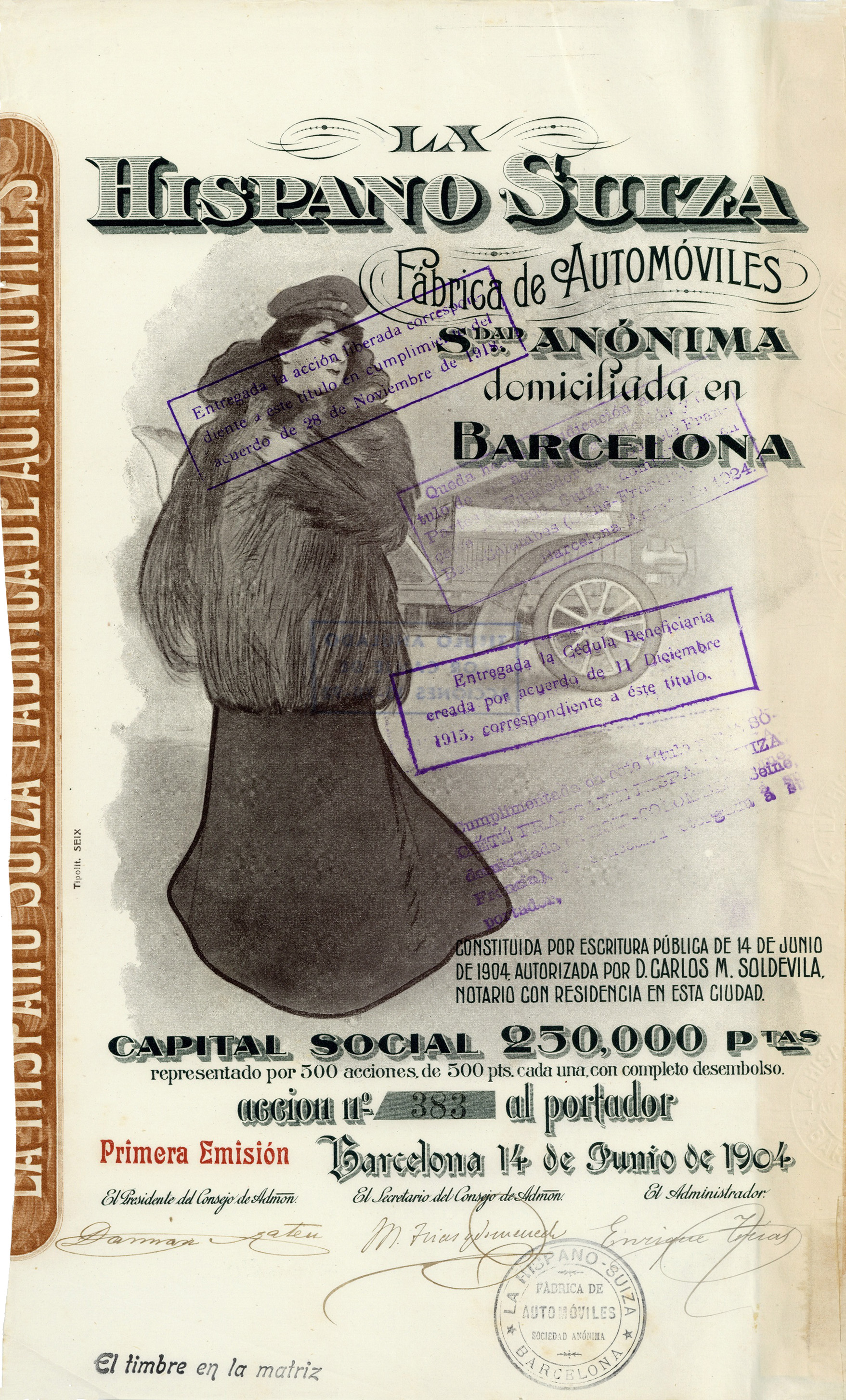
Stock certificate of June 14, 1904

Another restructuring took place in 1904, creating La Hispano-Suiza Fábrica de Automóviles under Castro's direction, also based in Barcelona. Four new engines were introduced in the next year and a half – a 3.8-litre and 7.4-litre four-cylinder and a pair of big six-cylinder engines were produced. This company managed to avoid bankruptcy and its largest operations remained in Barcelona until 1946, where cars, trucks, buses, aero engines and weapons were produced. Other factories in Spain were at Ripoll, Seville, and Guadalajara.

In 1910, Jean Chassagne competed with a Hispano-Suiza together with works drivers Pilleveridier and Zucarelli in the Coupe des Voiturettes Boulogne and the Catalan Cup Races, gaining second and fourth places respectively. France was soon proving to be a larger market for Hispano-Suiza's luxury cars than Spain. In 1911, an assembly factory called Hispano France began operating in the Paris suburb of Levallois-Perret. Production was moved to larger factories at Bois-Colombes, under the name Hispano-Suiza, in 1914 and soon became Hispano-Suiza's main plant for producing the largest, most costly models.

=== World War I ===
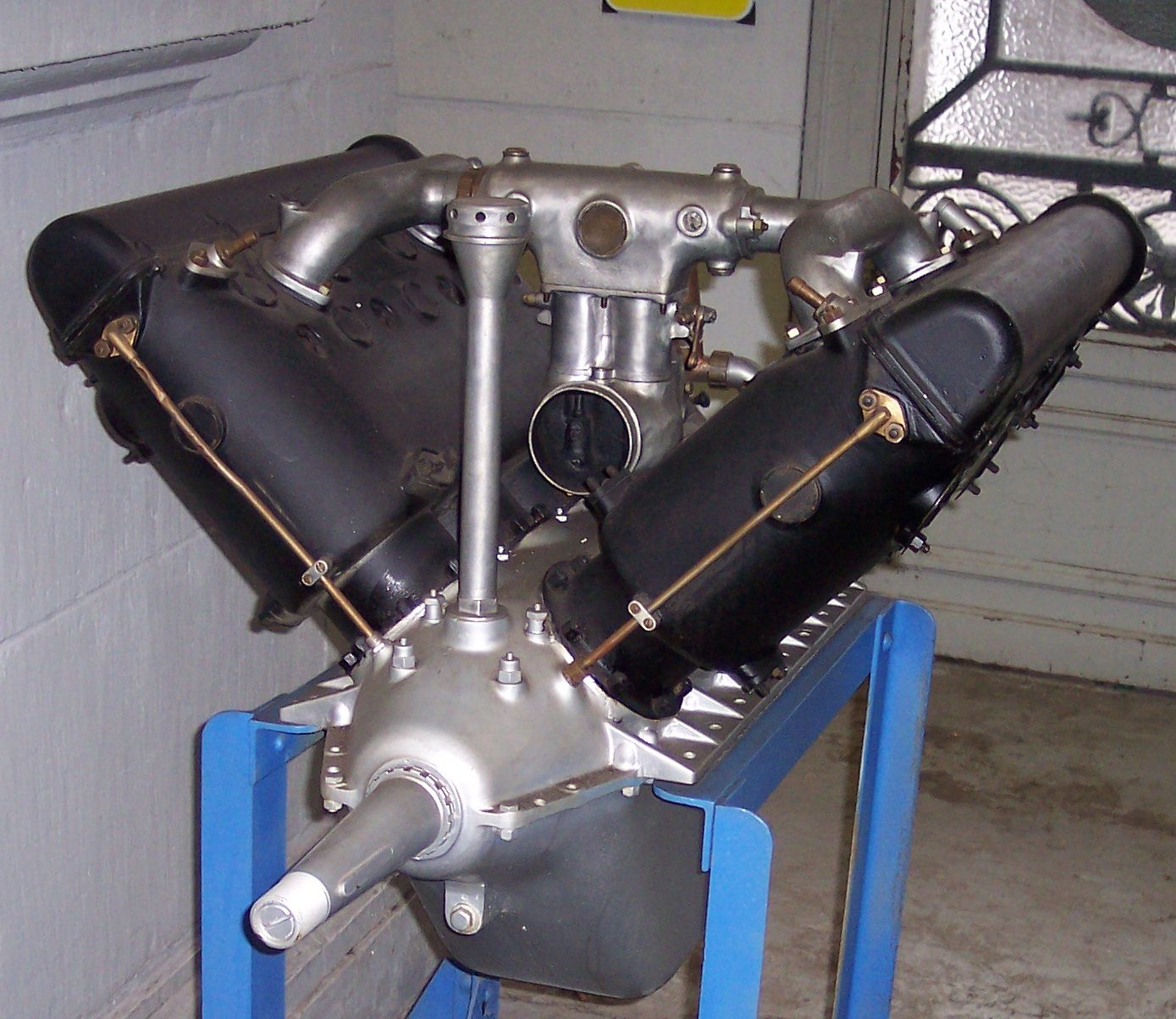
A Brussels museum-preserved Hispano-Suiza HS.8A SOHC aviation engine from World War I

With the start of World War I, Hispano-Suiza turned to the design and production of aircraft engines under the direction of Marc Birkigt. His chief engineer during this period was another Swiss, Louis Massuger. Traditionally, aircraft engines were manufactured by machining separate steel cylinders and then bolting these assemblies directly to the crankcase. Birkigt's novel solution, the Hispano-Suiza 8, called for the engine block to be formed from a single piece of cast aluminum, and into which thin steel liners were secured. Manufacturing an engine in this way simplified construction and resulted in a lighter, yet stronger more durable engine. Thus, Birkigt's new construction method created the first practical examples of what are commonly known today as "cast block" engines. His aluminum cast block V-8 design was also noteworthy for incorporating overhead camshafts, propeller reduction gearing and other desirable features that did not appear together on competitors' engines until the late 1920s. A major design feature added to the later HS.8B line was the use of a hollow propeller shaft for both the 8B and 8C gear-reduction versions, which when used for the HS.8C versions specifically engineered to accommodate one, allowed heavy calibre (usually 37 mm) projectiles to be fired through the hollow propeller shaft, avoiding the need for a synchronization gear, a feature used in future Hispano-Suiza military engines. Hispano-Suiza's aero engines, produced both at its own factories and under license, became the most commonly used aero engines in the French and British air forces, powering over half the alliance's fighter aircraft.

=== 1918–1936 ===
After World War I, Hispano-Suiza returned to automobile manufacturing, and in 1919 introduced the Hispano-Suiza H6. The H6 featured an inline 6-cylinder overhead camshaft engine based on the features of its V8 aluminium World War I aircraft engines and had coachwork done by well known coachbuilders like Hibbard & Darrin and D'Ieteren.

Licences for Hispano-Suiza patents were much in demand from prestige car manufacturers world-wide. Rolls-Royce used a number of Hispano-Suiza patents. For instance, for many years, Rolls-Royce installed Hispano-Suiza designed power brakes in its vehicles.

In 1923, the French arm of Hispano-Suiza was incorporated as the Société Française Hispano-Suiza, the Spanish parent company retaining control with 71% of the share capital. The French subsidiary was granted a large degree of financial and project independence to bring design and production direction into closer contact with its main markets, but overall direction remained at Barcelona. This arrangement increased the importance of the Bois-Colombes plant near Paris as Hispano-Suiza's premier luxury car plant, and while the Spanish operations continued to produce luxury cars (mostly the smaller, less expensive models), production in Spain moved increasingly to the production of buses, trucks and aircraft engines at several plants located around the country.

Through the 1920s and into the 1930s, Hispano-Suiza built a series of luxury cars with overhead camshaft engines of increasing performance. On the other hand, in the 1930s, Hispano-Suiza's V-12 car engines reverted to pushrod valve actuation to reduce engine noise.

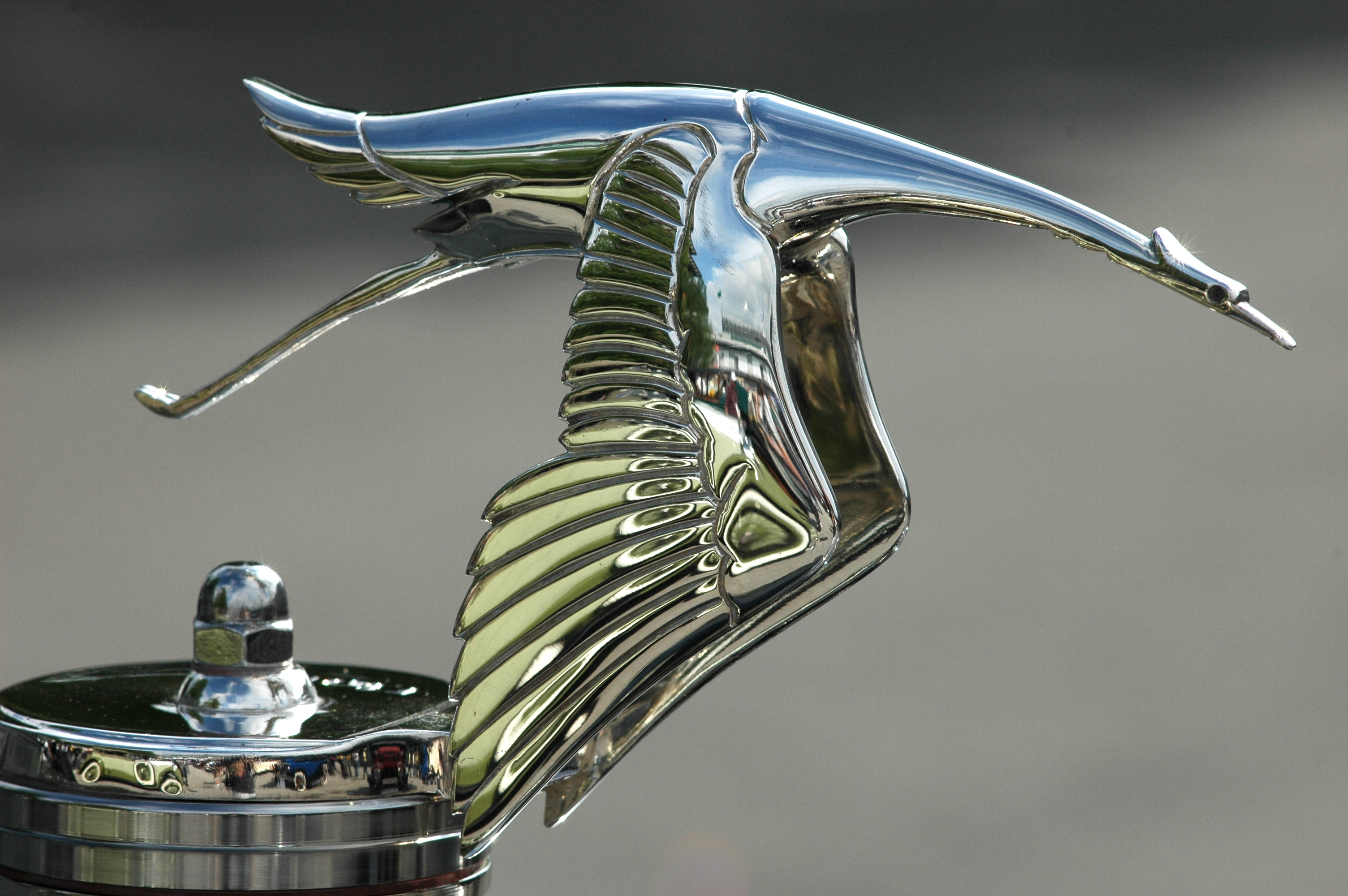
The stork hood ornament

The hood ornament atop the radiator after World War I was in the form of a stork, the symbol of the French province of Alsace, taken from the squadron emblem painted on the side of a Hispano-Suiza powered fighter aircraft that had been flown by the World War I French ace Georges Guynemer.

The smaller Hispano-Suiza T49 and T48 were also manufactured by the Spanish arm of the company between 1924 and 1944; these were somewhat smaller four- and six-cylinder models. Hispano-Suiza also developed a new, pushrod six-cylinder engine design intended for the American Hudson Motor Car Company, but due to the depression they were unable to put it into production. Hispano-Suiza ended up using this 3-litre (later 3.4 litres), six-cylinder engine themselves, for the Barcelona-built T60.

In 1925, Carlos Ballester obtained permission to represent Hispano-Suiza in Argentina. The agreement consisted of a phase in which the chassis were imported, followed by complete domestic production in Argentina. Thus Hispano Argentina Fábrica de Automóviles (HAFDASA) was born, for the production of Hispano-Suiza motors and automobiles, and also the production of spare parts for other car, truck, and bus manufacturers.

=== Spanish Civil War and WWII ===
After the outbreak of the Spanish Civil War in 1936, the autonomous government of Catalonia, on behalf of the Second Spanish Republic, collectivized control of Hispano-Suiza's Spanish factories and placed the company on a war footing. The company was divided into three sections:

- aircraft engines and cannons
- cars and trucks
- machine tools

Because of the international isolation of the Spanish republic, the Spanish arm of the company suffered from shortages.

In 1937, the French government took control of the French subsidiary of Hispano-Suiza with a 51 per cent share of the capital for the provision of war materiel, renaming the company La Société d’exploitation des matériels Hispano-Suiza. In 1938, the French company ceased automobile production and concentrated on aircraft engine production. At the time, Hispano-Suiza had just introduced a new series of water-cooled V-12 engines and the Hispano-Suiza 12Y was in great demand for practically every type of French aircraft. However, without the Spanish factories, Hispano-Suiza lacked the capacity to deliver enough engines for the rapidly growing French air force, and many new French fighter aircraft remained grounded for the lack of an engine when World War II began.

A development of the era were a series of 20 mm autocannon, first the Hispano-Suiza HS.9, followed by the Hispano-Suiza HS.404. The 404 was licensed for production in Britain and equipped almost all RAF fighter aircraft during the war. Production was also set up in the US, but these versions never matured even though the USAAC and US Navy both wanted to use it in place of their existing .50 BMG weapons. A lesser-known success was the Hispano-Suiza HS.820, a higher performance 20 mm design that was also used in the US as the M139. A variation of the 20 mm guns used on the Lockheed P-38 Lightning aircraft were produced by International Harvester. In 1970 Hispano-Suiza sold their armaments division to Oerlikon, the HS.820 becoming the KAD.

In 1940, Hispano-Suiza, together with the Spanish bank Banco Urquijo and a group of Spanish industrial companies, founded the Sociedad Ibérica de Automóviles de Turismo (S.I.A.T.). This led to Spain's first mass-production car maker, SEAT. After the civil war, Hispano-Suiza in Spain was severely affected by the war-devastated economy and the trade embargoes imposed by the allies. In 1946, Hispano-Suiza sold off its Spanish automotive assets to Enasa, a state owned company belonging to the Instituto Nacional de Industria that produced the Pegaso trucks, buses and, for a while, sport cars.

=== 1950s–present ===
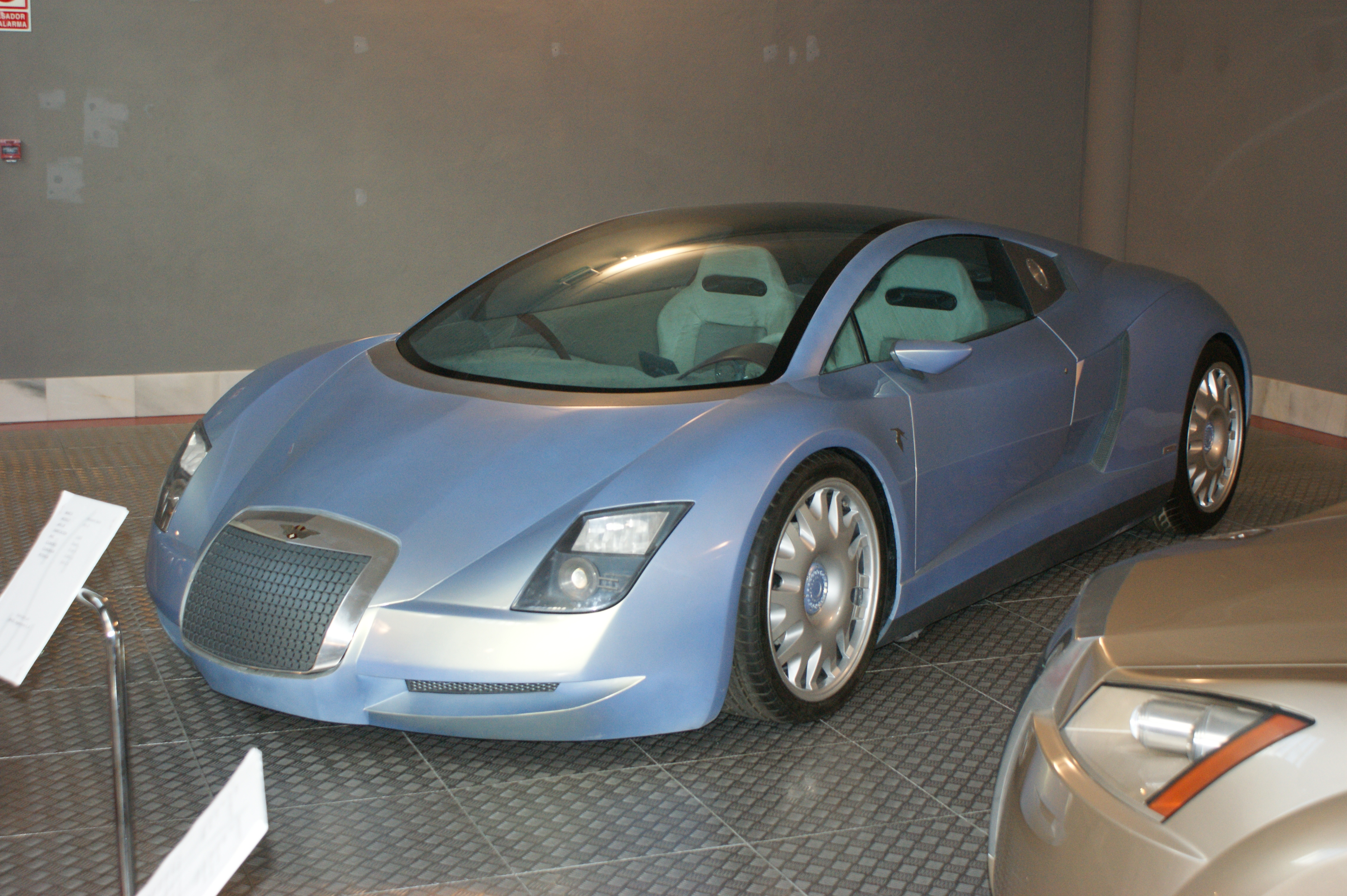
Hispano-Suiza HS21 by Mazel

After the Second World War, the French arm of Hispano-Suiza continued primarily as an independent aerospace firm. Between 1945 and 1955, it was building the Rolls-Royce Nene centrifugal compressor turbojet engine under license, designing landing gear in 1950 and Martin-Baker ejection seats in 1955. The company's attention turned increasingly to turbine manufacturing and, in 1968, it was taken over and became a division of SNECMA. In 1999, Hispano-Suiza moved its turbine operations to a new factory in Bezons, outside Paris, using the original factories for power transmissions and accessory systems for jet engines. In 2005, SNECMA merged with SAGEM to form SAFRAN.

In the early 2000s, Hispano-Suiza returned to the automotive world once more, presenting the HS 21 concept car at the 2000 Geneva Motor Show. Designed by Barcelona-based firm Mazel Group Engineering, the mid-engine, two-seater sports car was based on the Renault Sport Spider and was planned to use a BMW or Mercedes-Benz V12 engine. A second model, a luxury sedan named the Hispano-Suiza K8 was presented the following year. Finally, Mazel presented the Hispano-Suiza HS21 GTS in 2002, with the aim of building a car to compete in the 24 hours of Le Mans. The car did not race, and none of the previous concepts entered production.

The brand saw another attempt at a revival in the automotive sector, presenting a new model, the Hispano-Suiza V10 Supercharged, at the 2010 Geneva Motor Show, through a firm affiliated with designer Erwin Leo Himmel. Designed by Oliver Boulay, the concept car was based on the Audi R8 5.2 and featured a V10 engine tuned by Motoren Technik Mayer (MTM). It was expected to be priced at around EUR700,000; however, the planned production never materialised.

The official revival of the Hispano-Suiza brand occurred at the 2019 Geneva Motor Show with the debut of the Carmen, an all-electric supercar. This car was presented by the company Hispano Suiza Cars that is associated with the Peralada Group owned by the Suqué Mateu family, descendants of one of Hispano-Suiza's original founders, Damián Mateu. The car's design was influenced by the 1938 Hispano-Suiza H6B Dubonnet Xenia.

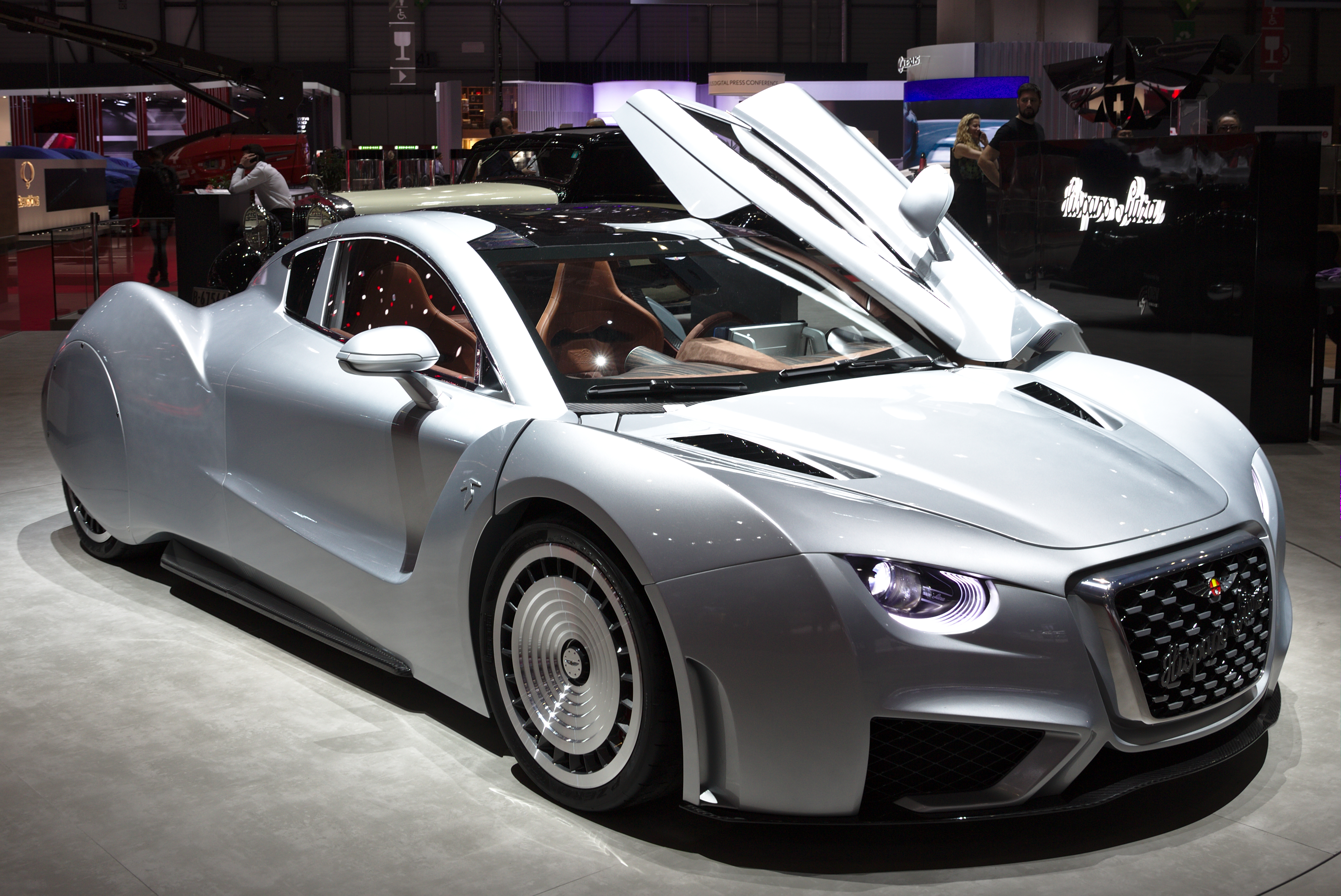
Hispano-Suiza Carmen on display at the 2019 Geneva Motor Show

== Corporate Leadership ==
=== Chief Executive Officers ===
- Sergio Martínez Campos (2019–present)

=== Presidents/Chairmen ===
- Damián Mateu Bisa (1904–1935)
- Miguel Mateu Pla (1935–1946)
- Miguel Suqué Mateu (2018–present)

== Gallery ==
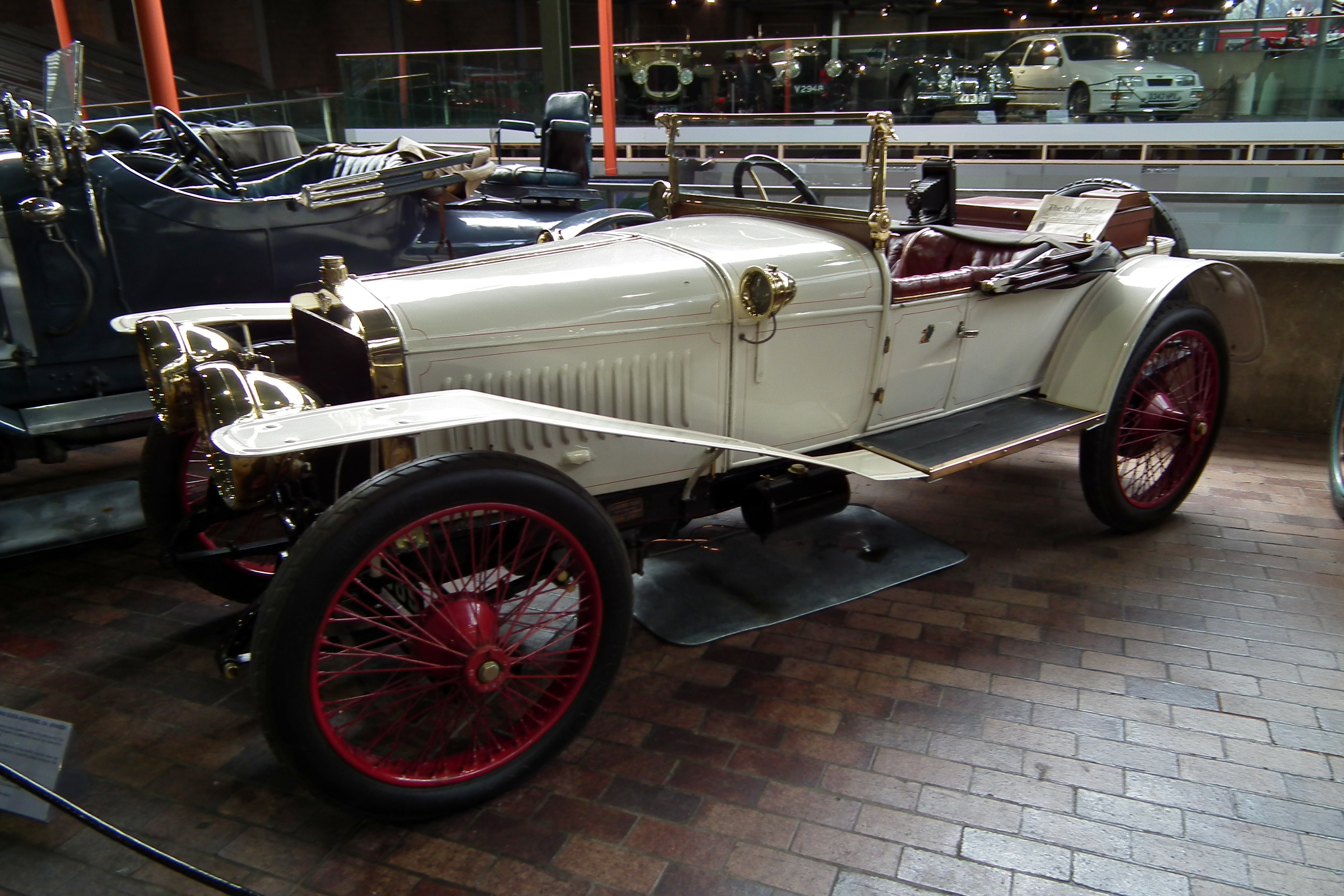
1912 Hispano-Suiza Alfonso XIII (Spain)

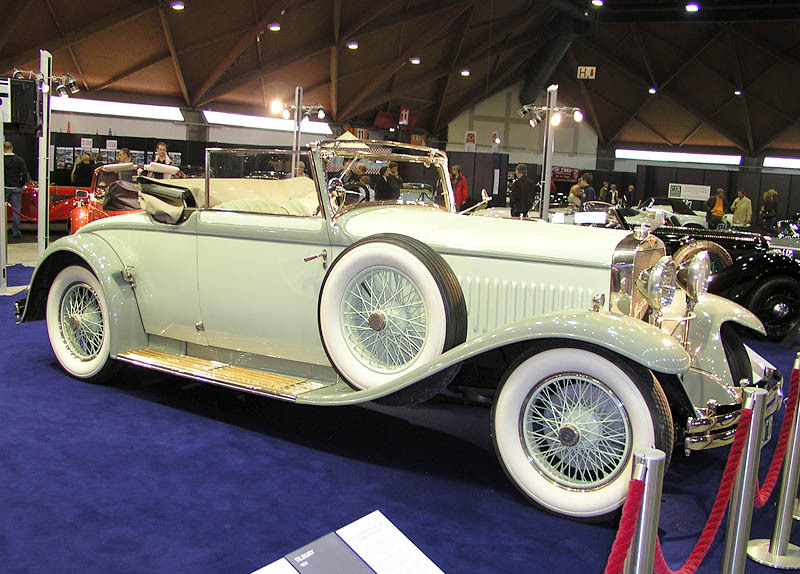
1929 Hispano-Suiza T49 (Spain)

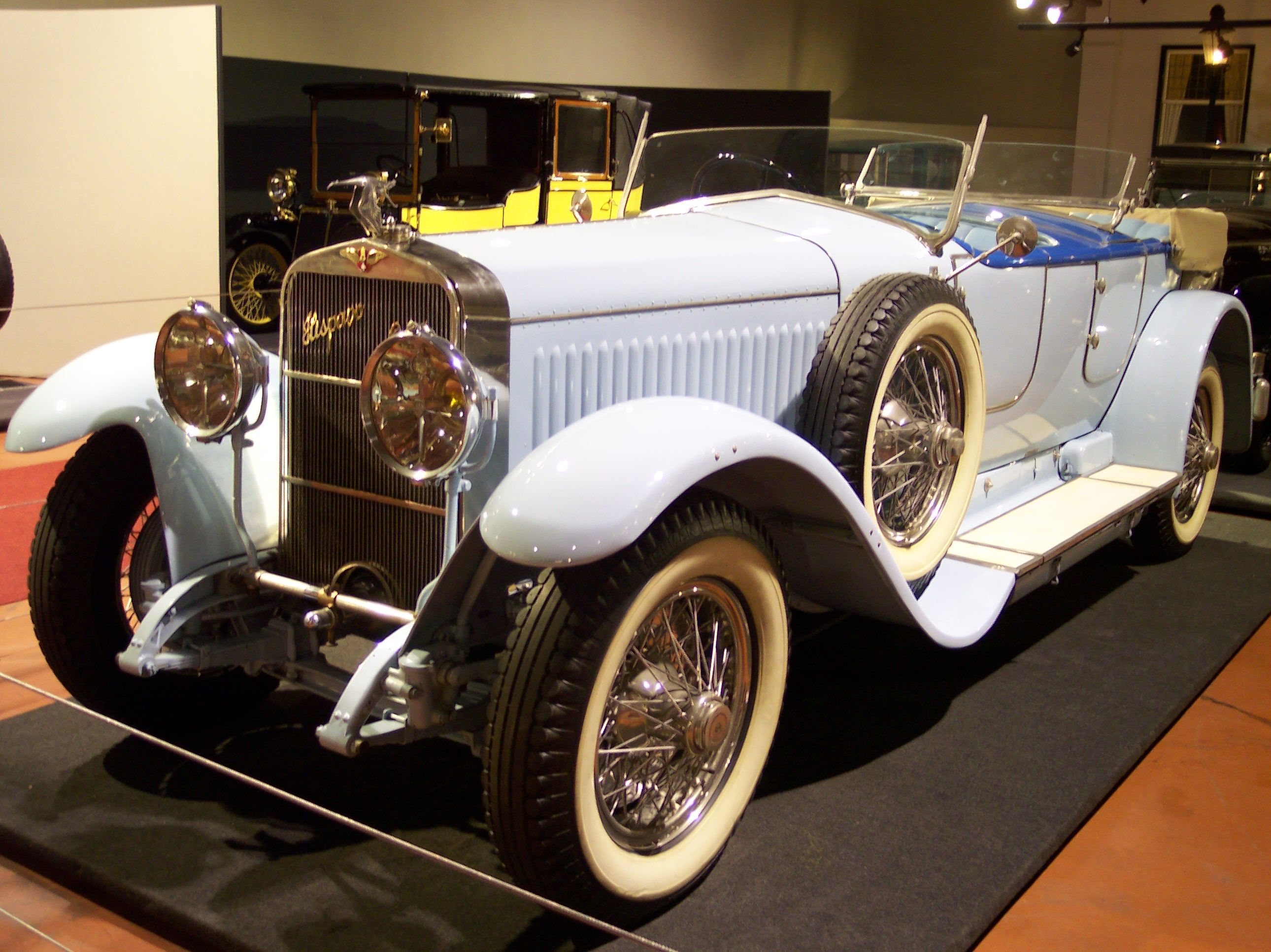
1934 Hispano-Suiza H6B Million-Guiet Dual-Cowl Phæton (France)

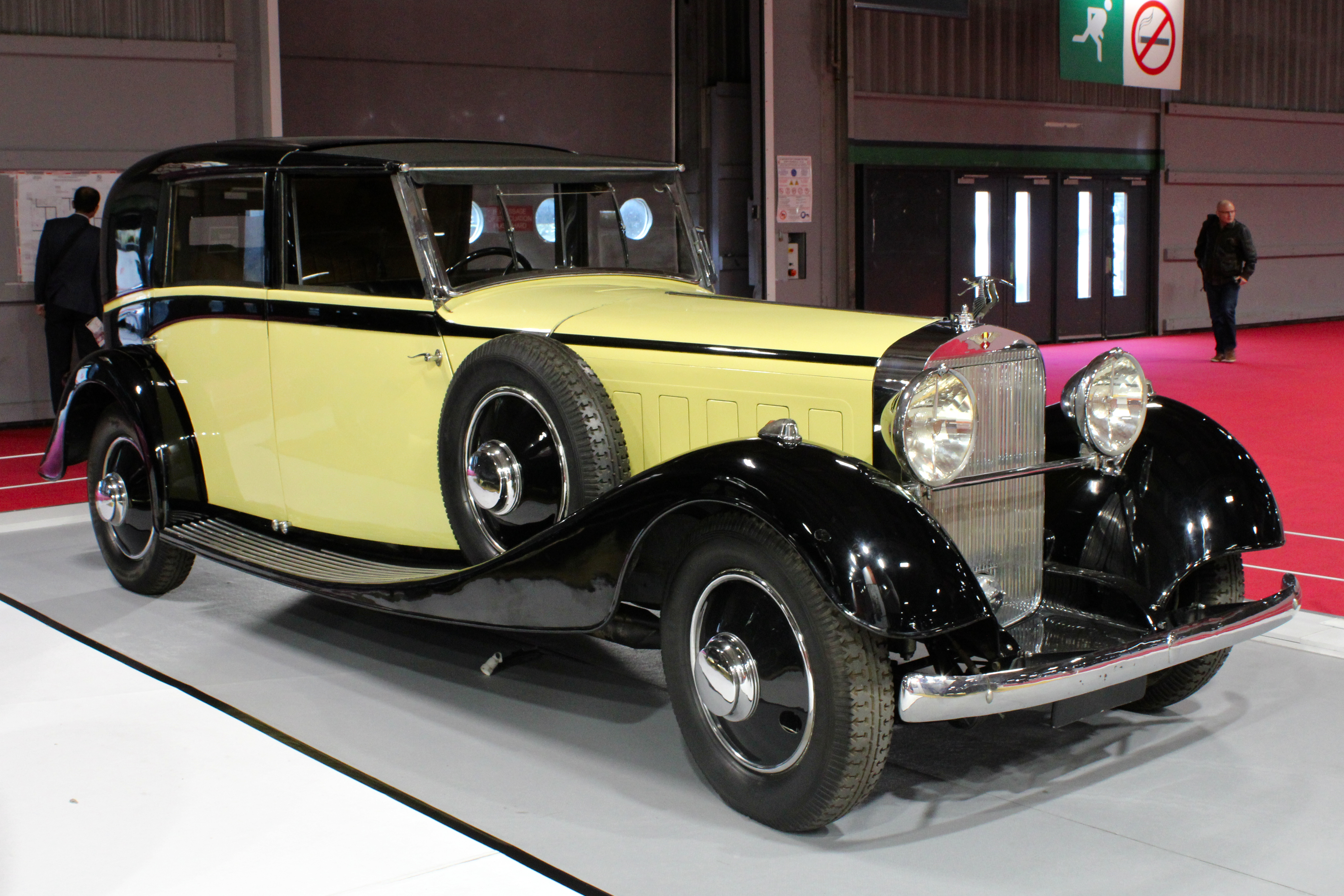
Hispano-Suiza J12 (France)

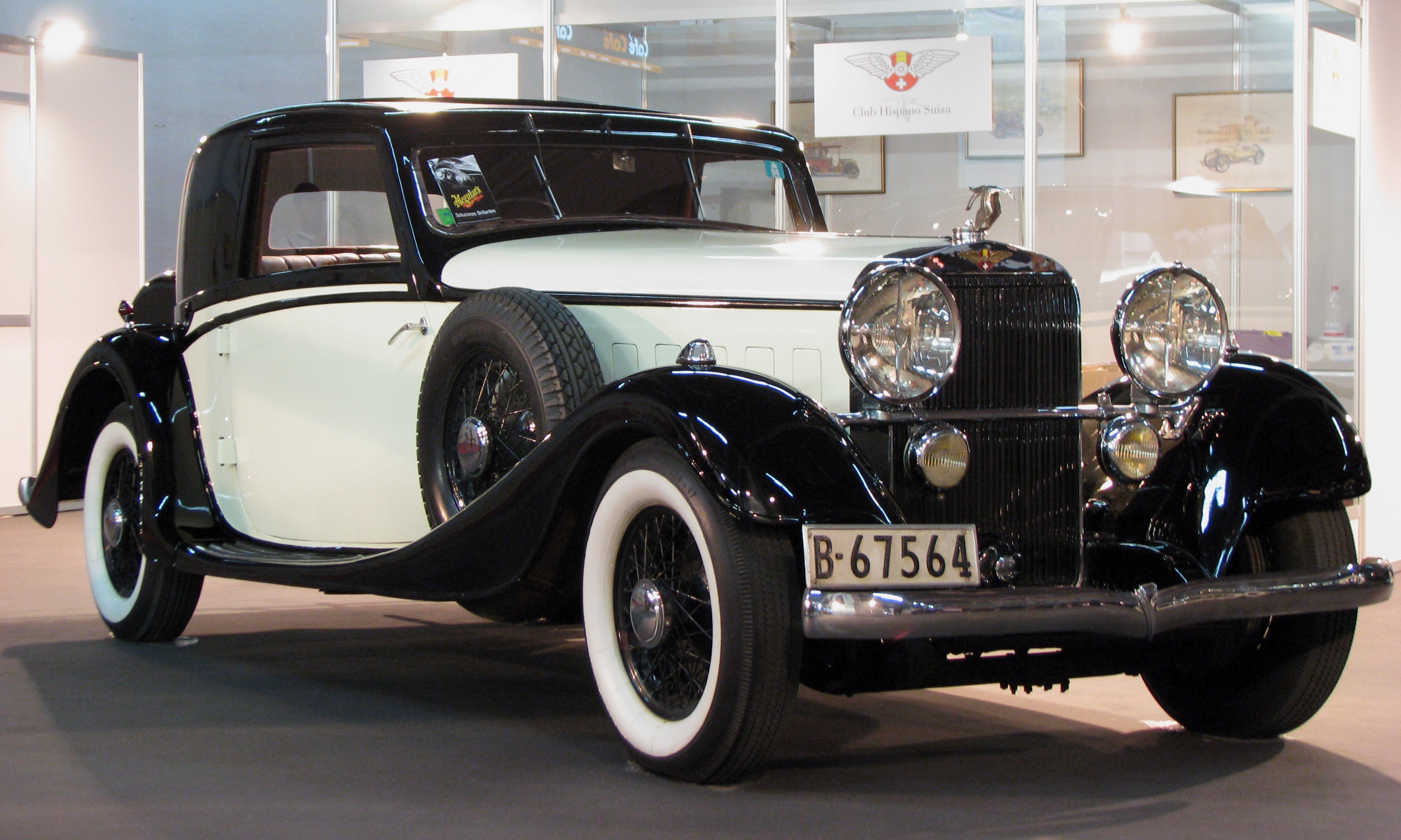
Hispano-Suiza K6 (France)

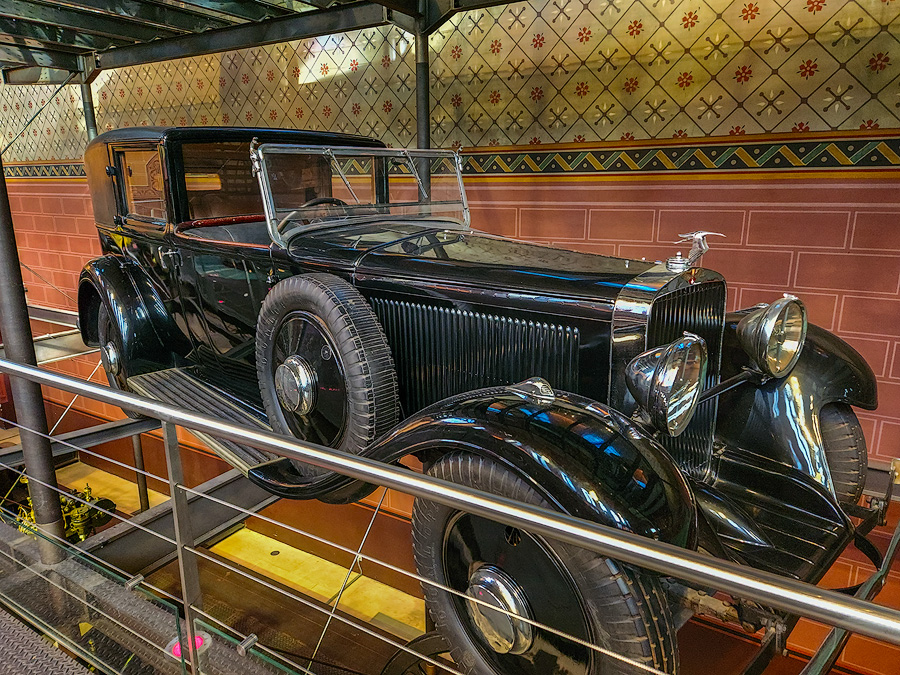
1935 Hispano-Suiza at the Musée des Arts et Métiers - Paris

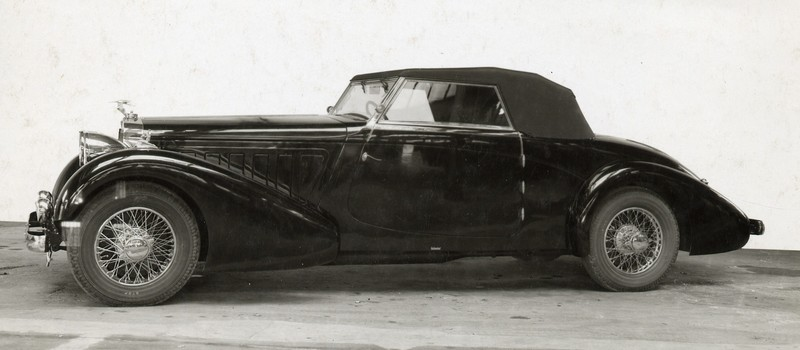
1936 Hispano-Suiza Pourtout (France)

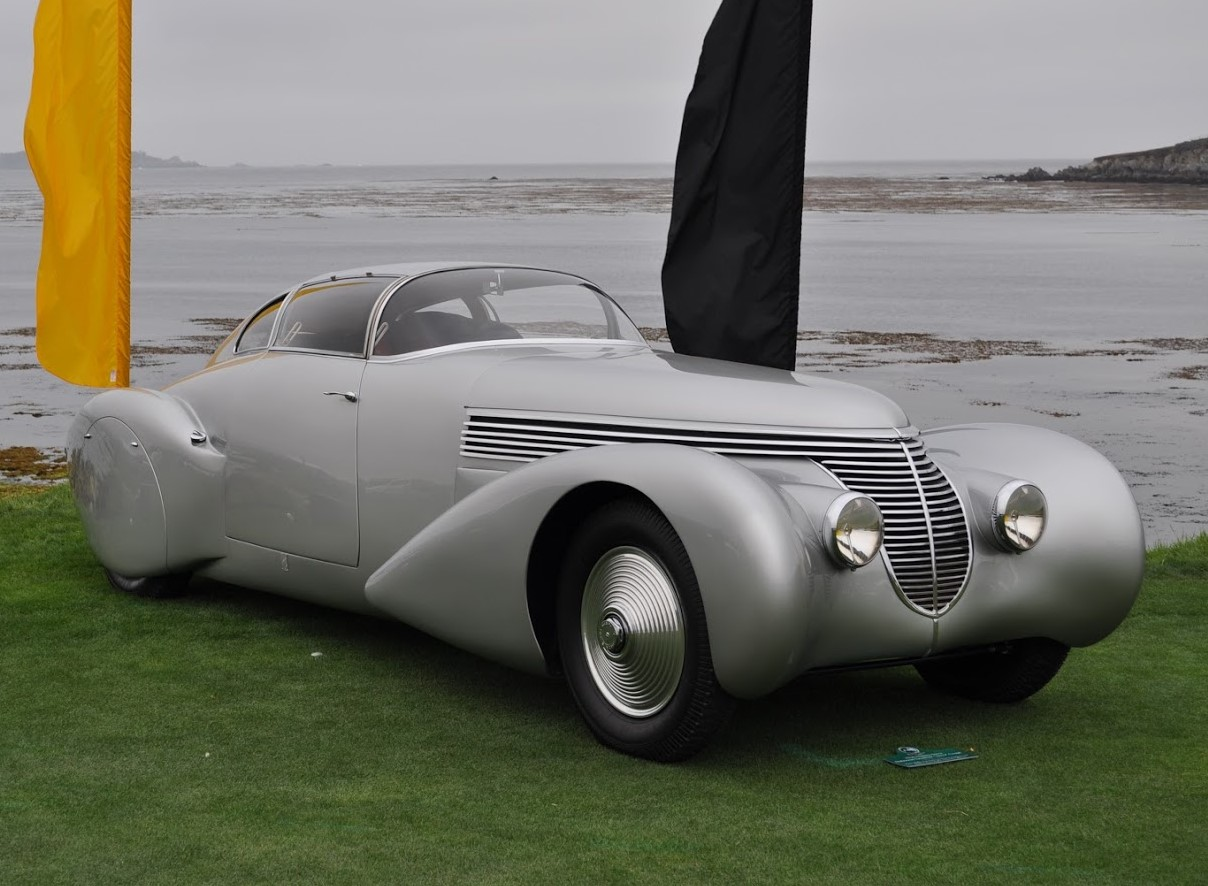
1938 Hispano-Suiza H6B Dubonnet Xenia

== Cars ==
Model	Year	N° of cylinders	Horsepower (PS)	Engine displacement	Bore × stroke	Brakes	Gearbox	Maximum speed
10 HP	1904	2	16 hp (11.8 kW)	1885 cc	100 mm × 120 mm (3.94 in × 4.72 in)	~	~	~
14–16 HP	1904	4	From 14 to 16	2412 cc	80 mm × 120 mm (3.15 in × 4.72 in)	~	~	60 km/h (37 mph)
Armoured type Birkigt	1905	4	30 hp (22 kW)	3768 cc	100 mm × 120 mm (3.94 in × 4.72 in)	~	~	87 km/h (54 mph)
20–30 HP	1906	4	30 hp (22 kW)	3768 cc	100 mm × 120 mm (3.94 in × 4.72 in)	~	~	100 km/h (62 mph)
40 HP	1906–1907	4	45 hp (33 kW)	7440 cc	130 mm × 140 mm (5.12 in × 5.51 in)	~	~	100 km/h (62 mph)
60–75 HP	1907	6	76 hp (56 kW)	11160 cc	130 mm × 140 mm (5.12 in × 5.51 in)	~	~	~
12–15 HP	1908–1913	~	18–20 hp (13–15 kW)	2212 cc	80 mm × 110 mm (3.15 in × 4.33 in)	~	~	~
20–30 HP	1908–1909	4	30 hp (22 kW)	3768 cc	100 mm × 120 mm (3.94 in × 4.72 in)	~	~	~
Alfonso XIII	1910–1914	4	46–64 hp (34–47 kW)	3416 cc 3616 cc 4584 cc	80 mm × 170 mm (3.15 in × 6.69 in); 80 mm × 180 mm (3.15 in × 7.09 in); 90 mm × 180 mm (3.54 in × 7.09 in)	rear: Drums (no front brakes)	Manual, 3 gears and reverse	121 km/h (75 mph)
15–20 HP	1910–1914	4	28–30 hp (21–22 kW)	2612 cc	80 mm × 130 mm (3.15 in × 5.12 in)	~	~	~
20–30 HP	1910	4	32 hp (24 kW)	4084 cc	100 mm × 130 mm (3.94 in × 5.12 in)	~	~	~
30–40 HP	1910–1914	4	43 hp (32 kW)	4712 cc	100 mm × 150 mm (3.94 in × 5.91 in)	rear: Drums (no front brakes)	Manual, 3 gears and reverse	~
T21 15HP deLuxe	1913–1914	4	30 hp (22 kW)	2612 cc	80 mm × 130 mm (3.15 in × 5.12 in)	rear: Drums (no front brakes)	Manual, 4 gears and reverse	~
T22 18HP deLuxe	1913–1914	4	50 hp (37 kW)	3816 cc	90 mm × 150 mm (3.54 in × 5.91 in)	rear: Drums (no front brakes)	Manual, 4 gears and reverse	~
T23 30HP deLuxe "30/90HP" in the UK	1913–1914	4	80 hp (59 kW)	5655 cc	100 mm × 180 mm (3.94 in × 7.09 in)	rear: Drums (no front brakes)	Manual, 4 gears and reverse	~
T24 8–10HP	1914–1922	4	33 hp (24 kW)	1847 cc	70 mm × 120 mm (2.76 in × 4.72 in)	rear: Drums (no front brakes)	Manual, 4 gears and reverse	~
T26	1914–1915	4	75 hp (55 kW)	4580 cc	90 mm × 180 mm (3.54 in × 7.09 in)	rear: Drums (no front brakes)	Manual, 4 gears and reverse	~
T30 16HP	1915–1922; 1922–1924	4	56 hp (41 kW)	2952 cc 3092 cc	85 mm × 130 mm (3.35 in × 5.12 in); 87 mm × 130 mm (3.43 in × 5.12 in)	rear: Drums (no front brakes)	Manual, 4 gears and reverse	~
Tipo 32; 30HP "España"	1917–1923; 1923–1924	4	95 hp (70 kW)	4712 cc 5702 cc	100 mm × 150 mm (3.94 in × 5.91 in); 110 mm × 150 mm (4.33 in × 5.91 in)	rear: Drums (no front brakes)	Manual, 4 gears and reverse	~
H6 (tipo 46); H6B (tipo 46 bis)	1919–1923; 1923–1928; 1929–1932	6	135 hp (99 kW) [CZ: 100 hp (74 kW)]	6597 cc	100 mm × 140 mm (3.94 in × 5.51 in)	4-wheel drums, power-assisted	Manual, 3 gears and reverse	137 km/h (85 mph)
T48	1924–1929	4	55–60 hp (40–44 kW)	2496 cc	85 mm × 110 mm (3.35 in × 4.33 in)	4-wheel drums, power-assisted	Manual, 3 gears and reverse	100 km/h (62 mph)
T49, "I 6"	1925–1936; 1939–1944*	6	85 hp (63 kW)	3746 cc	85 mm × 110 mm (3.35 in × 4.33 in)	4-wheel drums, power-assisted	Manual, 3 gears and reverse	120–135 km/h (75–84 mph)
T64 "Júnior 26HP"	1929–1935	6	90 hp (66 kW)	4580 cc	90 mm × 120 mm (3.54 in × 4.72 in)	4-wheel drums, power-assisted	Manual, 3 gears and reverse	130 km/h (81 mph)
T60	1932–1933	6	58 hp (43 kW)	3016 cc	80 mm × 100 mm (3.15 in × 3.94 in)	4-wheel drums, power-assisted	Manual, 3 gears and reverse	110 km/h (68 mph)
T60 RL/RLA	1934–1943	6	70 hp (51 kW)	3404 cc	85 mm × 100 mm (3.35 in × 3.94 in)	4-wheel drums, power-assisted	Manual, 3 gears and reverse	110 km/h (68 mph)
H6C	1924–29	6	160 hp (118 kW)	7983 cc	110 mm × 140 mm (4.33 in × 5.51 in)	4-wheel drums, power-assisted	Manual, 3 gears and reverse	177 km/h (110 mph)
T56	1928–36	6	46	~	~	~	~	
J12 (tipo 68) (tipo 68 bis)	1931–1938	12	220 hp (162 kW)	9425 cc	100 mm × 100 mm (3.94 in × 3.94 in)	4-wheel drums, power-assisted	Manual, 3 gears and reverse	150–160 km/h (93–99 mph)
J12 (tipo 68) (tipo 68 bis)	1935–1938	12	250 hp (184 kW)	11310 cc	100 mm × 120 mm (3.94 in × 4.72 in)	4-wheel drums, power-assisted	Manual, 3 gears and reverse	170 km/h (106 mph)
K6 (tipo 70)	1934–1937	6	140 hp (103 kW)	5184 cc	100 mm × 110 mm (3.94 in × 4.33 in)	4-wheel drums, power-assisted	Manual, 3 gears and reverse	140 km/h (87 mph)
H6B "Xenia"	1938	6	160	7983 cc	110 mm × 140 mm (4.33 in × 5.51 in)	4-wheel drums, power-assisted	Manual, 3 gears and reverse	177 km/h (110 mph)
Carmen	2020	–	503 bhp permanent-magnet synchronous electric motor on each rear wheel			380x34mm carbon-ceramic discs with six-piston Radi-CAL calipers	-	250 km/h (155 mph)
Carmen Boulogne	2021	–	503 bhp permanent-magnet synchronous electric motor on each rear wheel				-	250 km/h (155 mph)

The models H6B (1919–29), H6C (1924–29), I6 (1924), Hispano-Suiza Junior or HS26 (1931–32), J12 (1931–38) and K6 (1934–37) were made by the French division, the rest were typically manufactured in Spain. The H6/H6B was also built in Czechoslovakia and the T49 was built in Argentina between 1939 and 1944.

== Aircraft ==
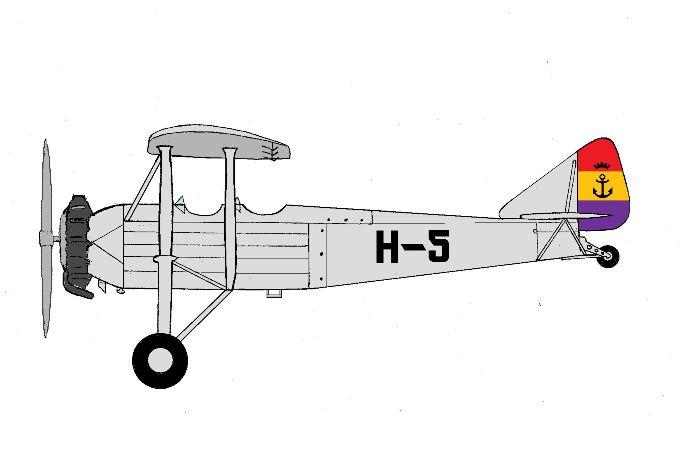
Hispano-Suiza E-30 of the Aeronáutica Naval

- Hispano Barrón, 1919
- Hispano-Suiza E-30, 1930
- Hispano-Suiza E-34, 1935

== Aircraft engines ==
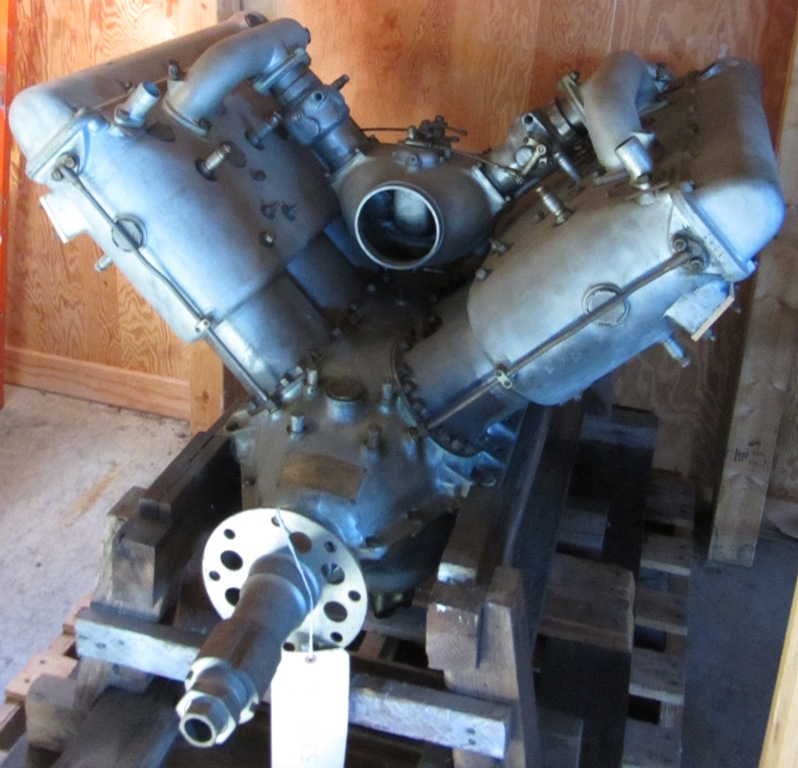
A 300hp Wright-Hisso H on display

- Hispano-Suiza 6M
- Hispano-Suiza 6P
- Hispano-Suiza 8A
- Hispano-Suiza 8B
- Hispano-Suiza 8E
- Hispano-Suiza 8F
- Hispano-Suiza 9Q licensed Wright R-975 Whirlwind
- Hispano-Suiza 9T diesel radial
- Hispano-Suiza 9V licensed Wright R-1820 Cyclone
- Hispano-Suiza 12B (1945)
- Hispano-Suiza 12G (W-12)
- Hispano-Suiza 12H
- Hispano-Suiza 12J
- Hispano-Suiza 12K
- Hispano-Suiza 12L
- Hispano-Suiza 12M
- Hispano-Suiza 12N
- Hispano-Suiza 12X
- Hispano-Suiza 12Y
- Hispano-Suiza 12Z
- Hispano-Suiza 14AA radial
- Hispano-Suiza 14AB radial
- Hispano-Suiza 14H radial
- Hispano-Suiza 18R
- Hispano-Suiza 18S
- Hispano-Suiza 24Z
- Hispano-Suiza 48H
- Hispano-Suiza 48Z
- Hispano-Suiza R.300
- Hispano-Suiza R.800
- Hispano-Suiza Tay
- Hispano-Suiza Verdon
- Latécoère-(Hispano-Suiza) 36Y

== See also ==
- Hispano Aviación
- Hispano-Argentina
- Ballester–Molina
- Timeline of most powerful production cars
- Marc Birkigt
