= Hispano-Suiza Carmen =

Electric sports car

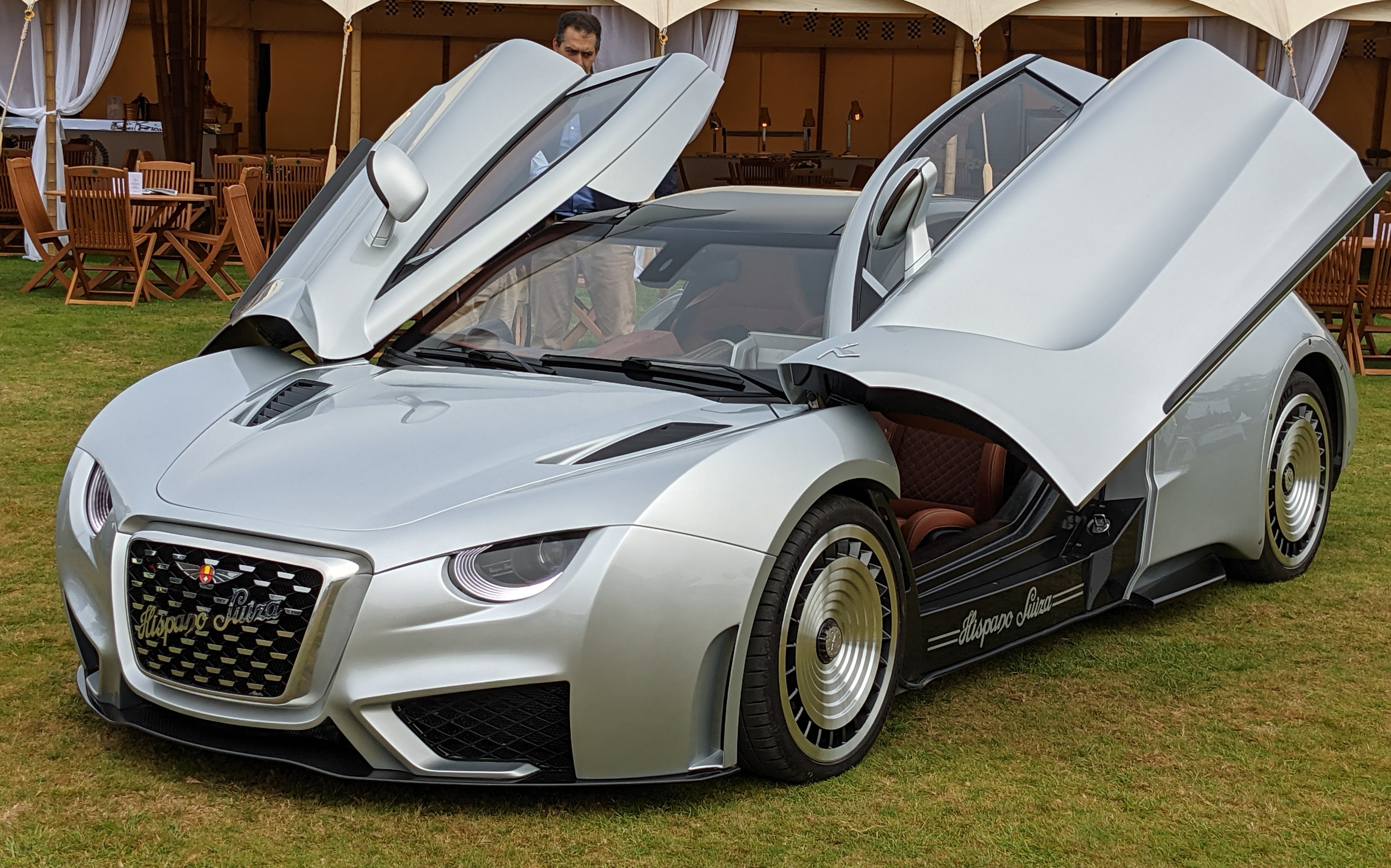
- 2021 Hispano-Suiza Carmen

Overview
- Manufacturer: Hispano-Suiza
- Production: 2019–2021 (Carmen) (19 units); 2021–present (Carmen Boulogne) (5 planned)
- Assembly: Spain: Barcelona

Body and chassis
- Class: Sports car (S)
- Body style: 2-door coupe
- Layout: RMR

Powertrain
- Electric motor: 2x Permanent magnet motors
- Power output: 749.5 kW (1,005 hp; 1,019 PS) (Carmen); 819.3 kW (1,099 hp; 1,114 PS) (Carmen Boulogne)
- Battery: 80 kWh 750V Lithium-polymer (LiPo)

Dimensions
- Wheelbase: 2,800 mm (110 in)
- Length: 4,733 mm (186.3 in)
- Width: 2,040 mm (80 in)
- Height: 1,242 mm (48.9 in)
- Kerb weight: 1,690 kg (3,730 lb)

The Hispano-Suiza Carmen is an electric sports car produced by Hispano-Suiza.

== History ==
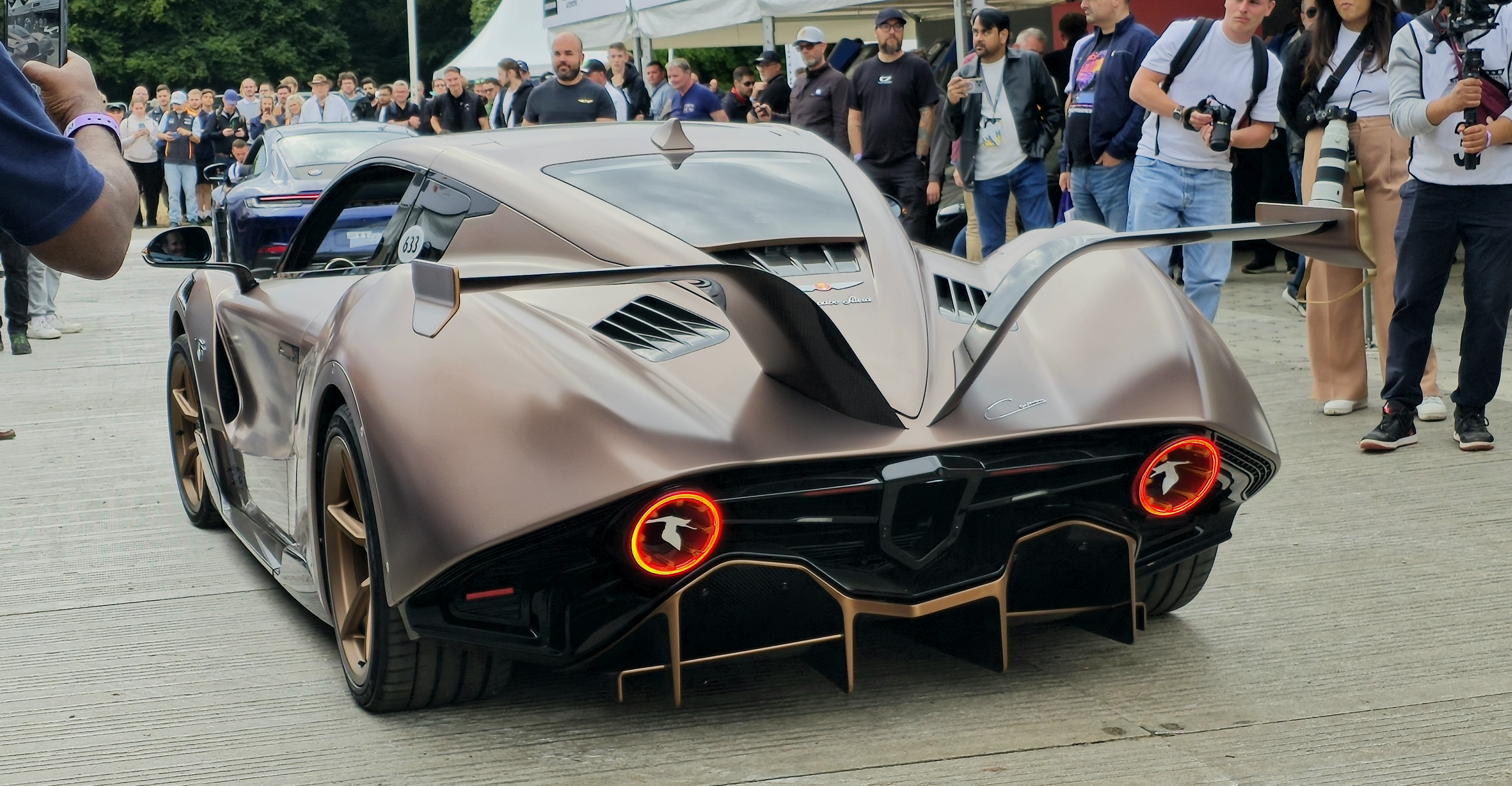
2024 Hispano-Suiza Carmen Sagrera rear

The Carmen marked the first Spanish car produced under the Hispano-Suiza brand since the 1930s. The Carmen premiered at the 2019 Geneva Motor Show in the form of a two-door coupe. The car was built on a carbon fiber frame covered with an aluminum body. Hispano-Suiza built this car a response to other high performance electric cars from companies such as Lotus and Rimac.

The stylistic design of the car was done by Barcelona-based design studio Cero Design, taking inspiration from the Hispano-Suiza H6B Dubonnet Xenia. This inspiration is shown in details such as the covered wheel arches over the rear wheels, as well as the pointed rear end, decorated with embossing and logos referring to historical Hispano-Suiza markings. The Carmen is named after Carmen Mateu, the granddaughter of one of the co-founders of Hispano-Suiza Damián Mateu. This attempted to restore Hispano-Suiza as an automotive company, and the founders of Hispano-Suiza Cars paid tribute to her.

== Carmen Boulogne ==
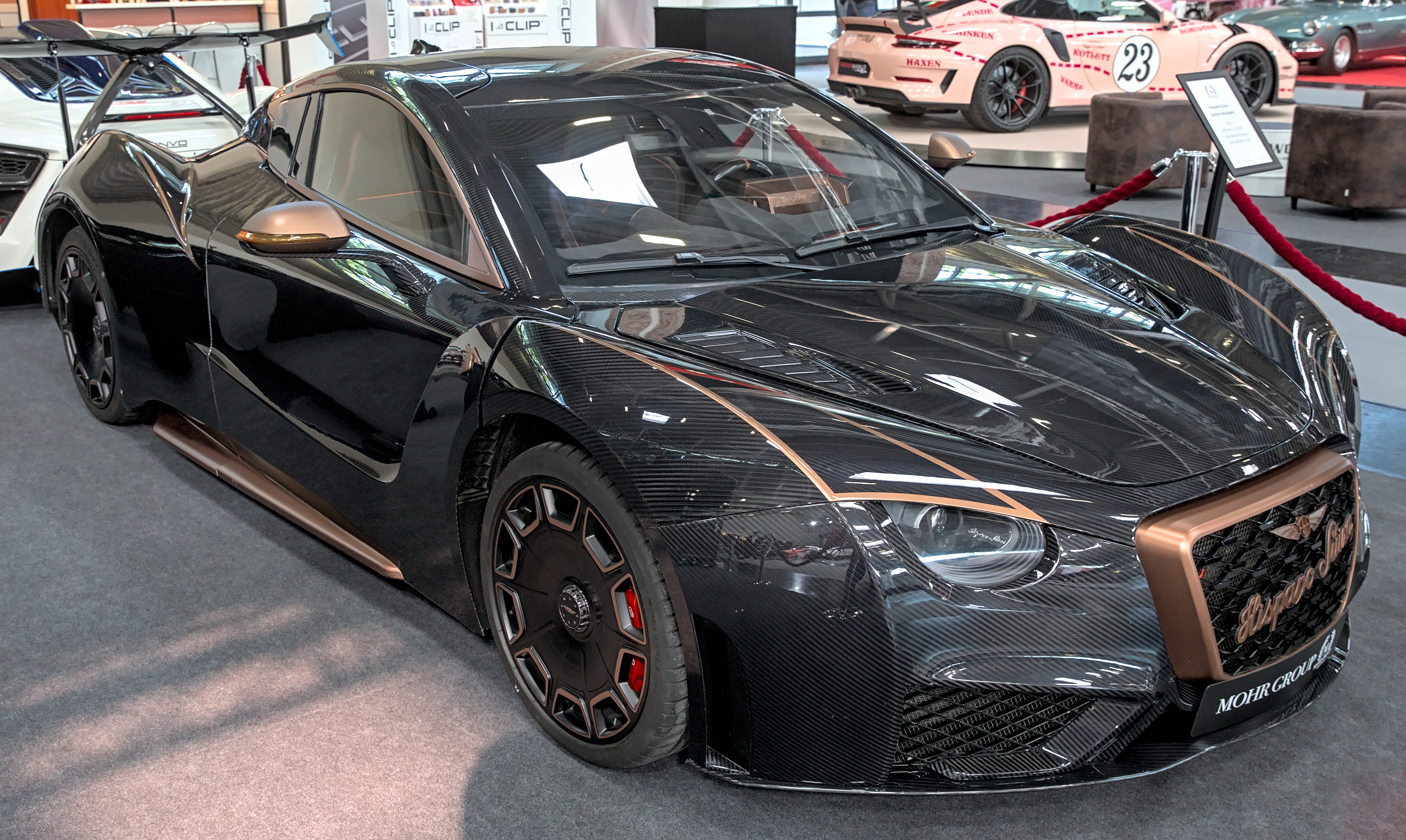
Hispano-Suiza Carmen Boulogne at IAA 2021

In September 2021, Hispano-Suiza introduced a limited version of the Carmen called the Carmen Boulogne. The car underwent extensive visual modifications, losing the characteristic rear wheel covers, and gaining an unpainted, black carbon fiber body with copper inserts. The car also gained a more powerful drive system, with two more electric motors added to the standard two electric motors, giving it a total power of 1114 hp and 1600 Nm of torque. The car can accelerate from 0-100 km/h (62 mph) in 2.7 seconds, and the top speed is limited to 290 km/h (180 mph). The company planned to construct five copies, with deliveries scheduled for 2022. The price of the vehicle is less than € 2 million.

== Gallery ==
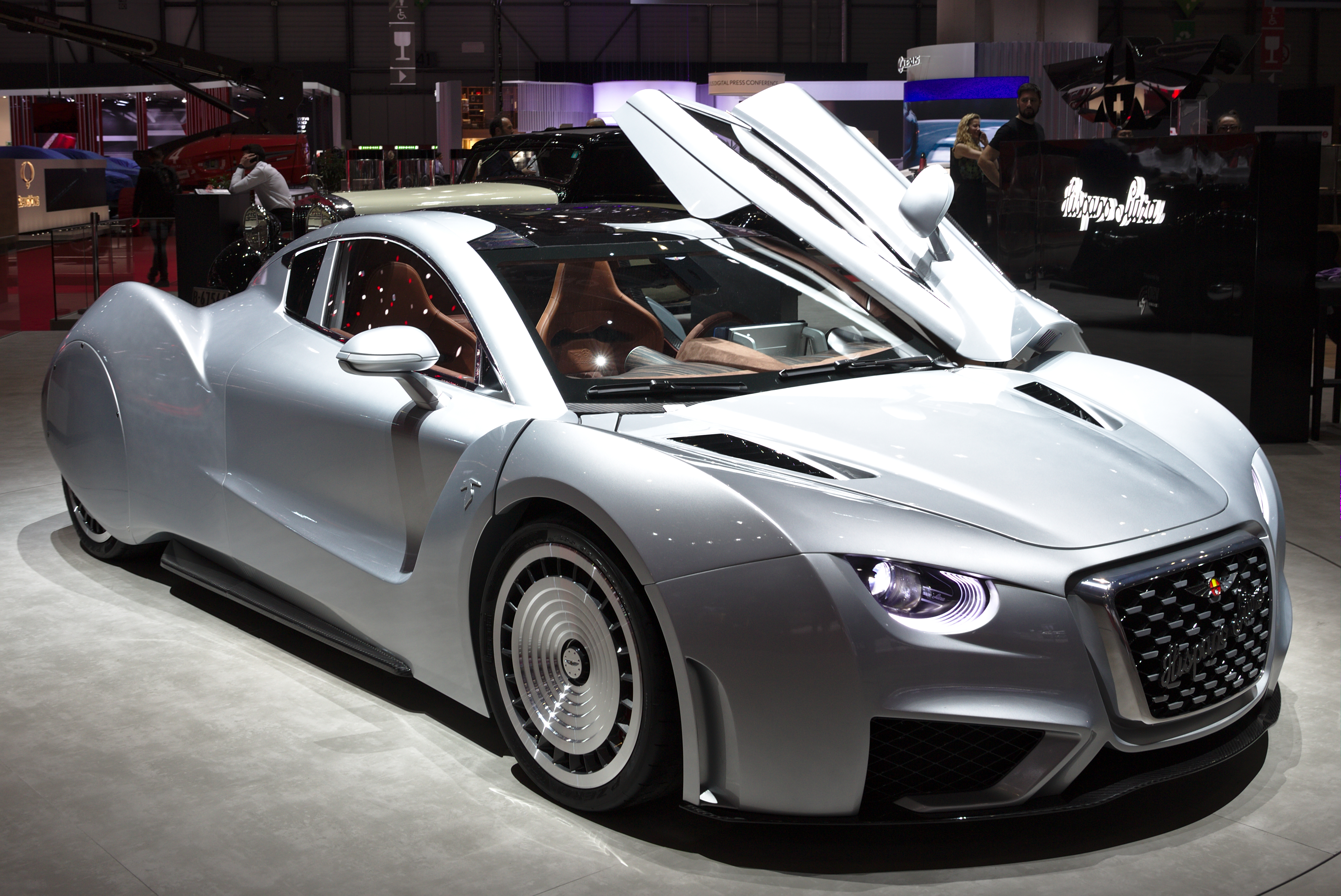
Hispano-Suiza Carmen at the 2019 Geneva Motor Show

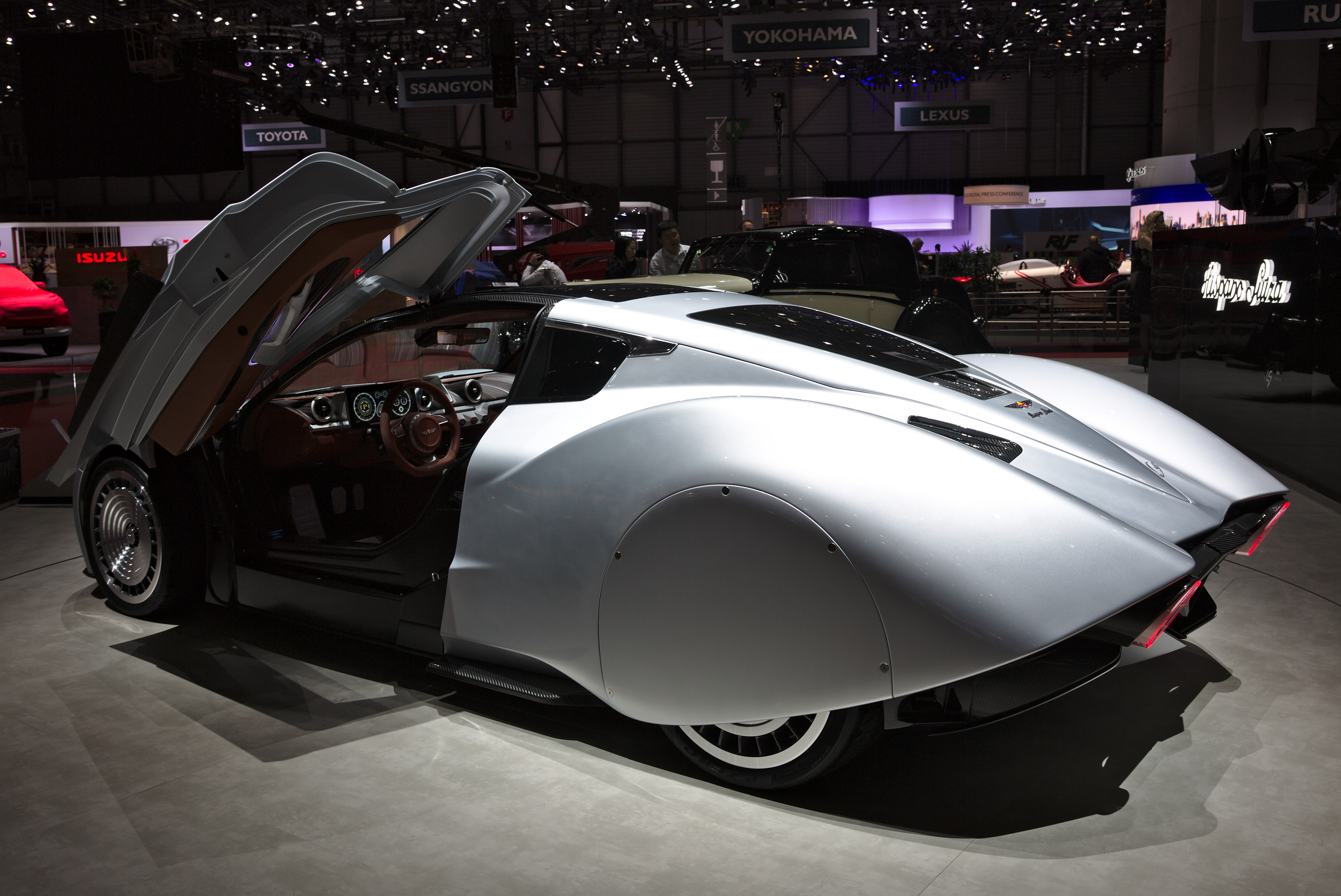
Hispano-Suiza Carmen at the 2019 Geneva Motor Show

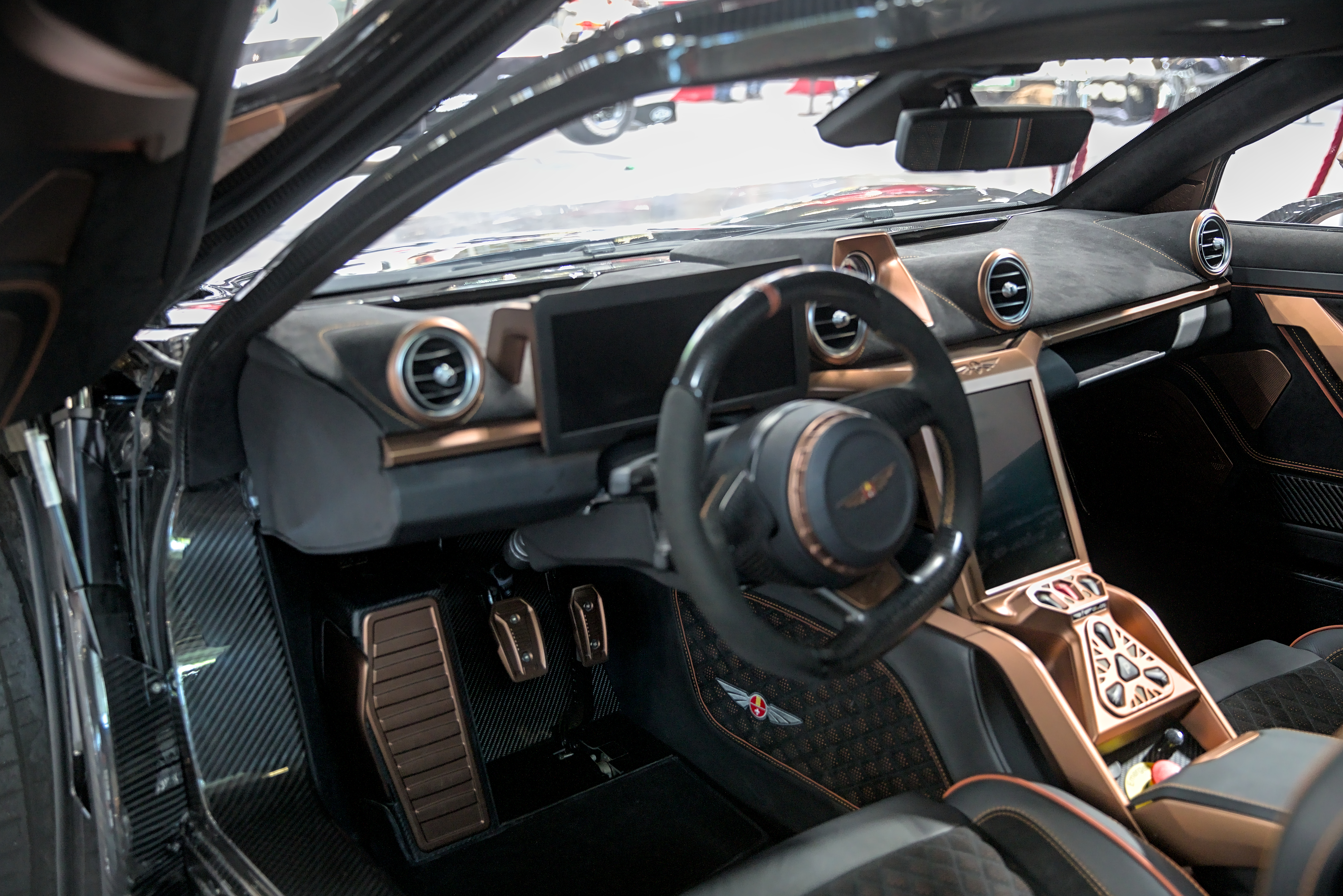
Hispano-Suiza Carmen Boulogne interior
