= Hispano-Suiza K8 =

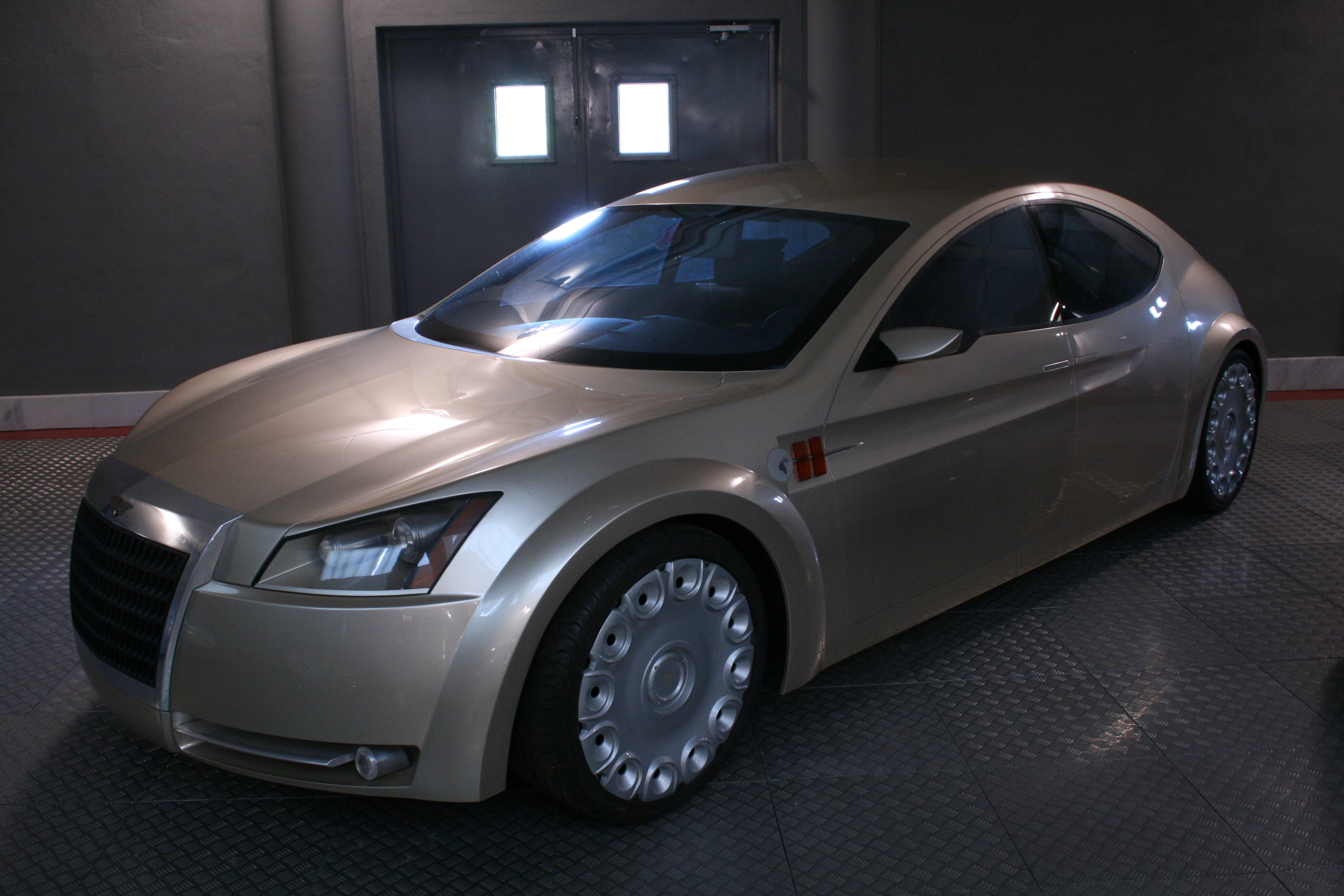

Overview
- Manufacturer: Mazel Group Engineering
- Production: 2001

Body and chassis
- Class: Prototype
- Body style: Four-door sedan
- Layout: Front engine and four-wheel drive

Dimensions
- Length: 4960mm
- Width: 2000mm
- Height: 1430mm

The Hispano-Suiza K8 is a concept car from the Spanish company Mazel, first presented at the 2001 Geneva Motor Show as a luxury sedan. It is a four-seater sports car. The interior of the vehicle (dashboard, doors, steering wheel and seats) is covered in ochre - coloured leather.

Mazel was the company that was dedicated to the design of this car, and with it, they revived the Hispano-Suiza brand. After this prototype, they designed the Hispano-Suiza HS21-GTS.

== Specifications ==
This car has a naturally aspirated 4.2-litre V8 engine, which develops 360 hp at 7200 rpm. It has a six-speed sequential gearbox and four-wheel drive. It has ventilated disc brakes on all four wheels.
