= Mazel Identity i1 =

Vehicle Concept

The Mazel Identity i1 is a two-seater Spanish sports car concept, which has been produced by Mazel with cooperation and input from the H2R Design firm. It was presented at the 2006 Geneva Motor Show.

The car is 4.43 metres (174.4 in) in length, 1.92 metres (75.6 in) wide and is 1.26 metres (49.6 in) in height, with a wheelbase of 2.69 metres (105.9 in). It has an aluminium 8-cylinder engine mounted in central position, with rear-wheel drive, and maybe brought into full production in the future.
