= Hispano-Suiza H6B Dubonnet Xenia =

One-off luxury car based on a Hispano-Suiza H6B

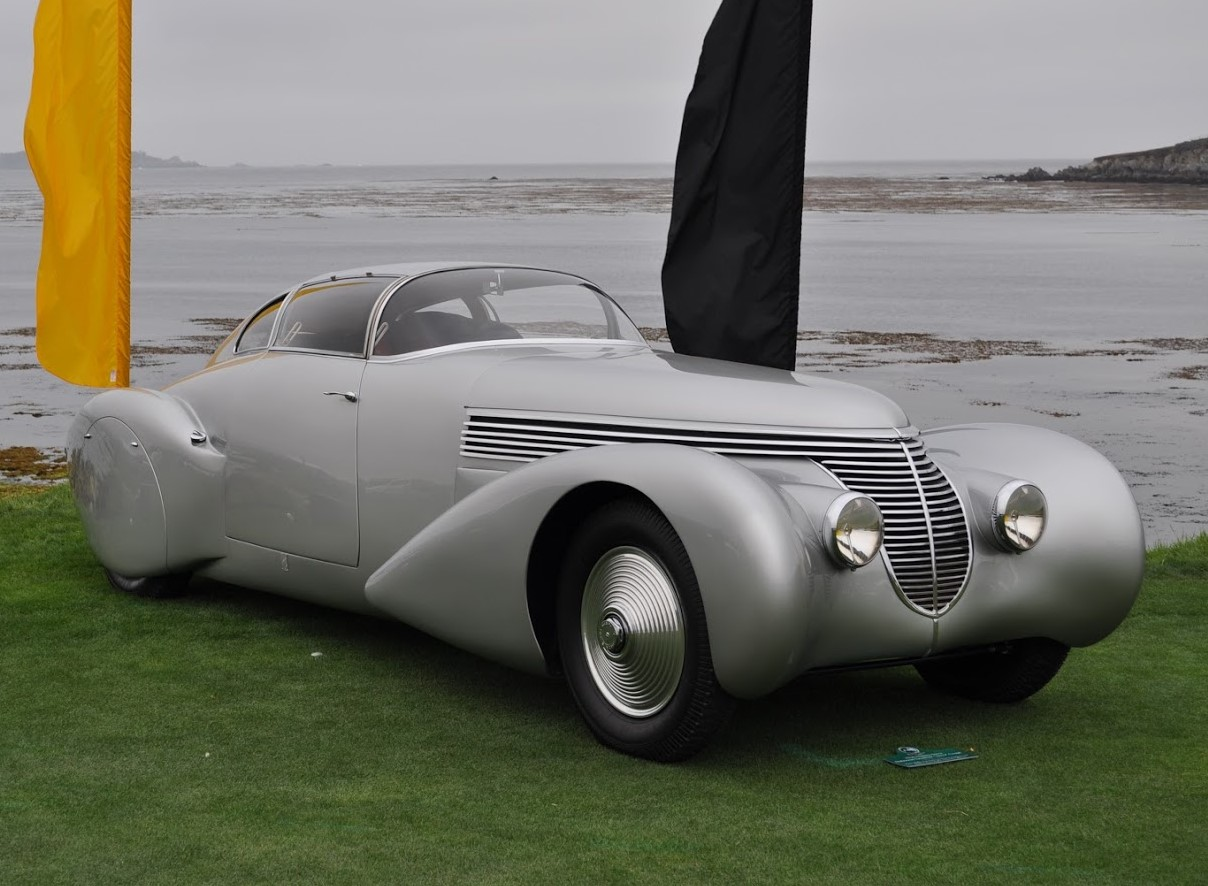

Overview
- Manufacturer: Hispano-Suiza
- Production: 1938 (1 built)
- Assembly: France: Paris (Bois-Colombes factory)
- Designer: Jean Édouard Andreau; Saoutchik

Body and chassis
- Class: Luxury car
- Body style: 2-door targa top
- Layout: Front mid-engine, rear-wheel-drive
- Doors: Rear-hinged pantograph doors
- Related: Hispano-Suiza H6

Powertrain
- Engine: 8.0 L straight-6
- Transmission: 4-speed manual

Dimensions
- Wheelbase: 4,064 mm (160.0 in)
- Length: 5,664 mm (223.0 in)
- Width: 1,956 mm (77.0 in)
- Height: 1,575 mm (62.0 in)

The Hispano-Suiza H6B Dubonnet Xenia is a one-off luxury car built on the chassis of a Hispano-Suiza H6B for French pilot and racing car driver André Dubonnet in 1938. Although it is based on an H6B, it uses the larger, more powerful engine from the H6C, features an entirely new suspension system designed by Dubonnet, and a body built by coachbuilder Saoutchik from a design by aerodynamicist Jean Édouard Andreau.

== History ==
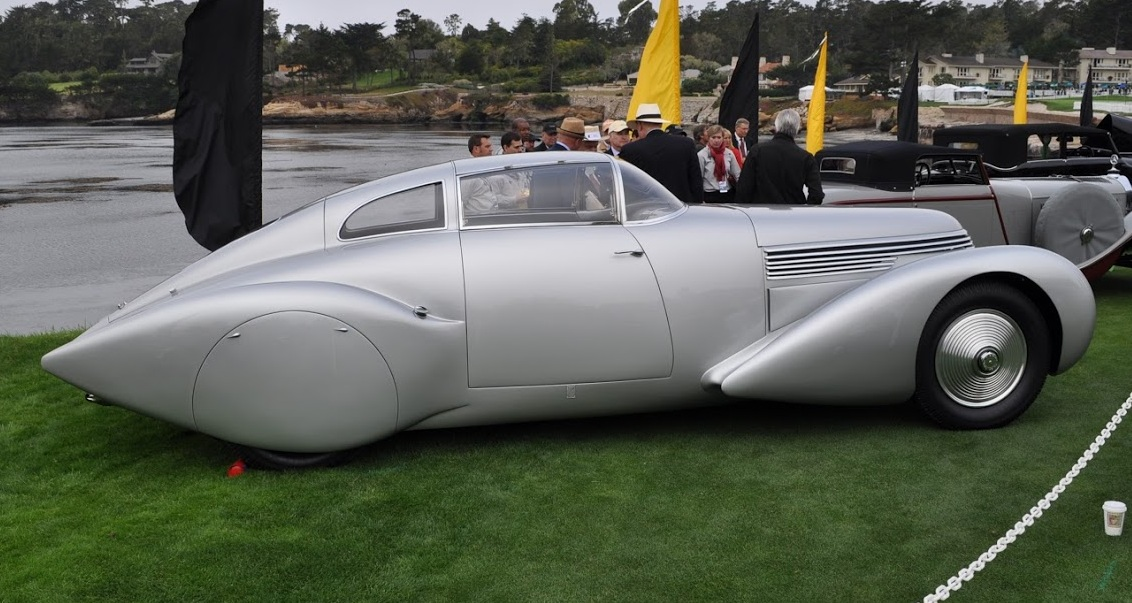
H6B Dubonnet Xenia side view

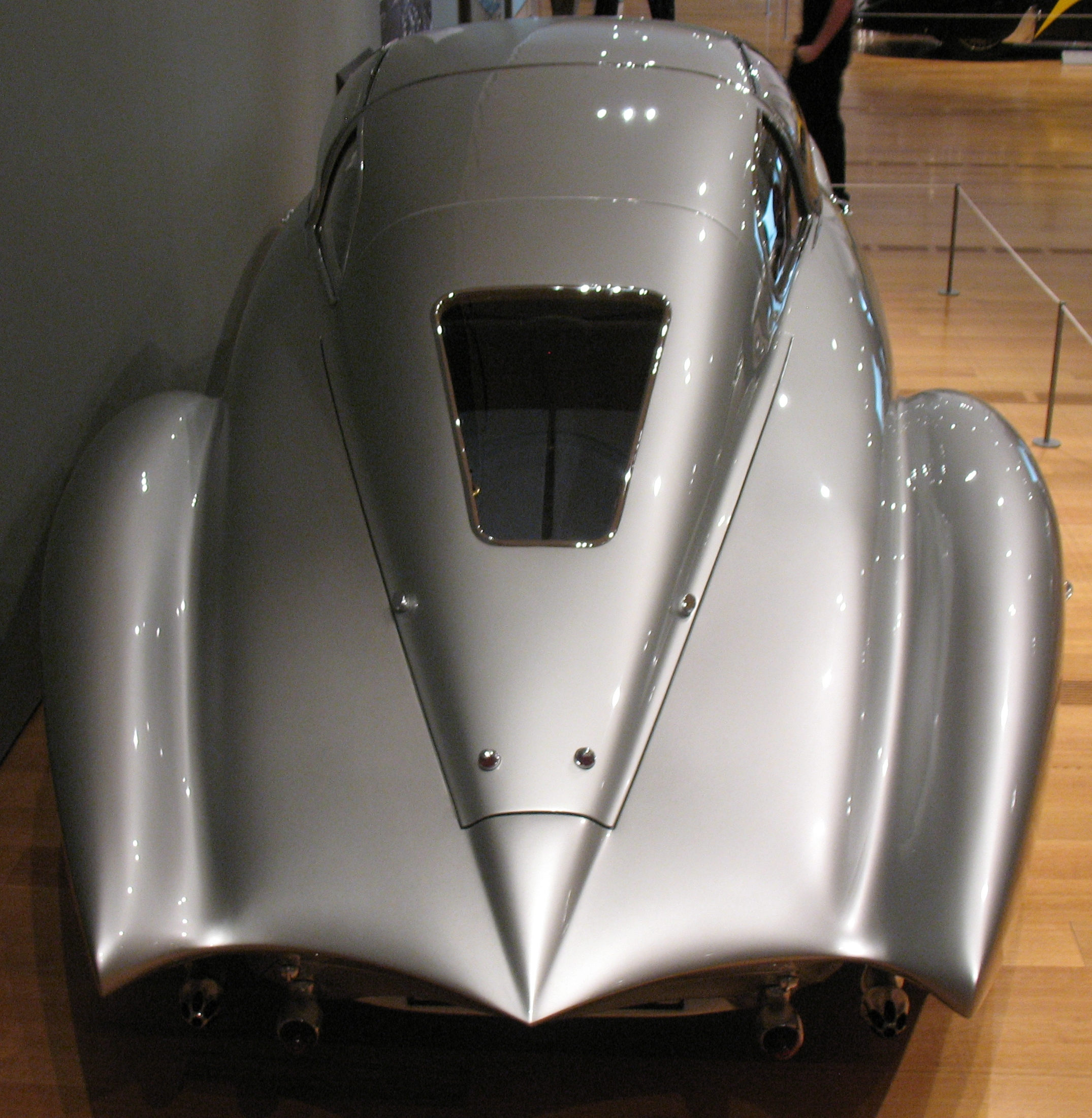
View of the teardrop shaped rear end from above

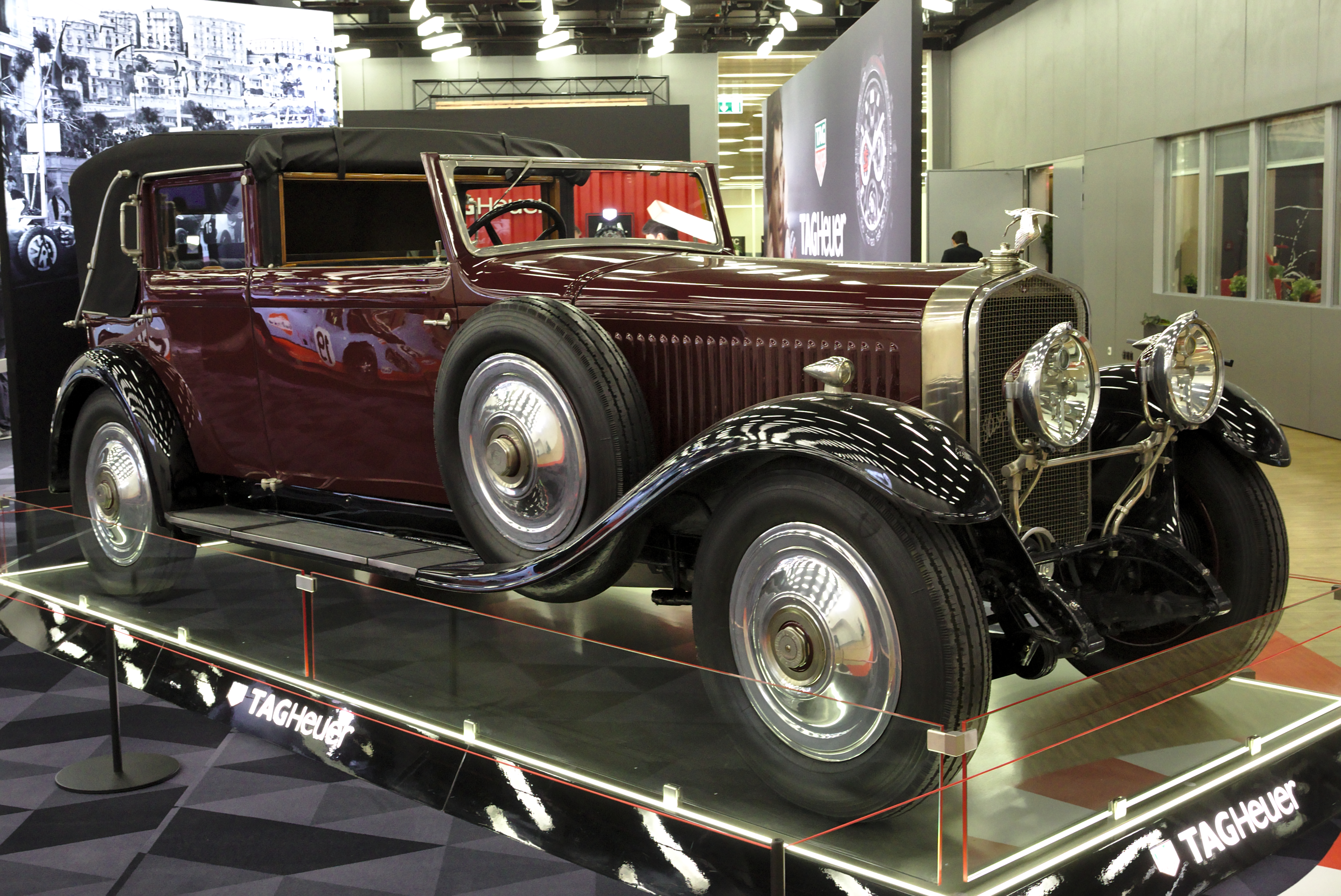
1929 Hispano-Suiza H6B

In the 1920s, André Dubonnet became involved with automobiles as a racing driver for Bugatti and Hispano-Suiza, participating in Grand Prix events like the 1926 Targa Florio and winning the 1922 Autumn Grand Prix at Monza. During this time, Dubonnet developed an automobile steering and suspension system, the système Dubonnet. The Dubonnet suspension featured an independent coil spring and shock absorber system that traded durability for a reduction of unsprung weight and increased comfort.

Dubonnet first installed this suspension system on a custom Hispano-Suiza H6B chassis in 1932. Following coachwork done by Carrosserie Vanvooren's Marius Daste, a prototype car was displayed to the public at the 1932 Paris Motor Show. This prototype was heavily based on the H6B, using the same engine, transmission, and brakes as the production car. It was presented in the sedan body style, with rear suicide doors and a long sweeping tail.

The success of his prototype at the Paris Motor Show was evident in the fact that he soon sold the Dubonnet suspension system to several major automobile manufacturers, including General Motors, Alfa Romeo, Fiat, and Delahaye. In the mid 1930s, Dubonnet's focus shifted from suspension to aerodynamics. In 1935, he partnered with aerodynamicist Jean Andreau to develop the Dubonnet Dolphin, a Ford-based prototype built by Letourneur et Marchand. At a test at the Autodrome de Linas-Montlhéry in 1936, the Dolphin achieved a 35% higher top speed and 25% better fuel economy than a contemporary Ford with the same engine, demonstrating the importance of aerodynamics in design to the Automobile Club of France. The Dolphin prototype was eventually purchased by Henry Ford and shipped to the United States.

Dubonnet's second wife, Xenia Howard-Johnston, died prematurely in 1936 after four years of marriage. As a tribute to his late wife, Dubonnet decided to create a further development of his 1932 H6B prototype, a car he would call the Xenia in her memory. The Xenia showcased the Dubonnet independent suspension of the earlier model alongside the streamlined aerodynamics of the later Dolphin, resulting in a car again designed with the help of Andreau with a body built by French coachbuilder Saoutchik. The final product, which now differed substantially from the Hispano-Suiza H6B on which it was based, was finished in 1938.

== Specifications ==
=== Powertrain ===
Although based on the chassis of the H6B, the Dubonnet Xenia uses the upgraded straight-six engine from the H6C model. This 7,983 cc (487 cu in) SOHC engine utilized an aluminum block and a billet steel crankshaft for a lighter and stronger construction. The engine produced 160 hp (118 kW) at 3,050 rpm, able to propel the car to an estimated top speed of around 175 km/h (109 mph) thanks to the slippery aerodynamics of the body.

=== Transmission ===
The Dubonnet Xenia was built with a 4-speed manual transmission built by Hispano-Suiza. This is another difference from the production H6 models, all of which used 3-speed manuals.

=== Suspension ===
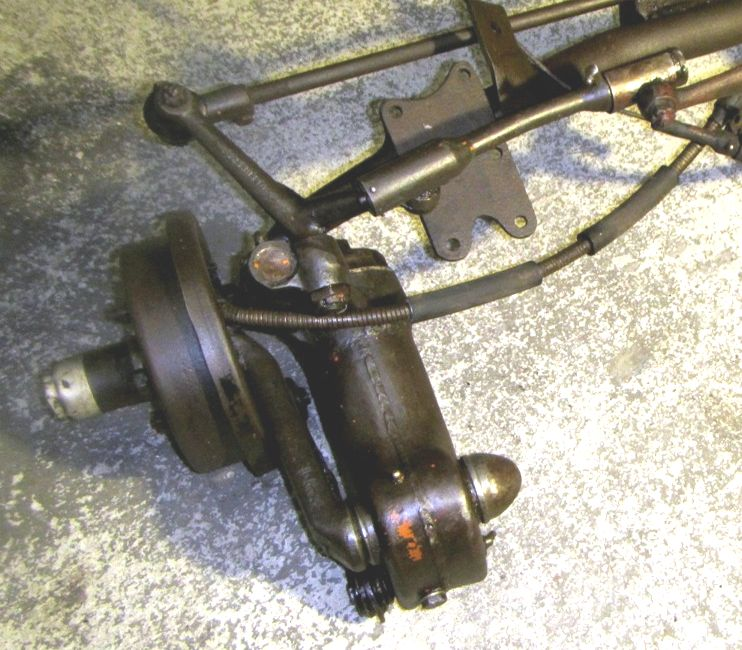
Dubonnet suspension

As a showcase of his own automotive inventions, the Dubonnet Xenia utilized Dubonnet's custom independent coil spring suspension at all four wheels. This design was intended to improve the comfort and smoothness of the ride, with Dubonnet claiming the system had "the suppleness of a cat", and likening the experience of driving the car to floating on air.

The Dubonnet Xenia used the standard brakes from the production H6B, which meant servo-assisted alloy brake drums at the front and rear axles.

=== Exterior features ===
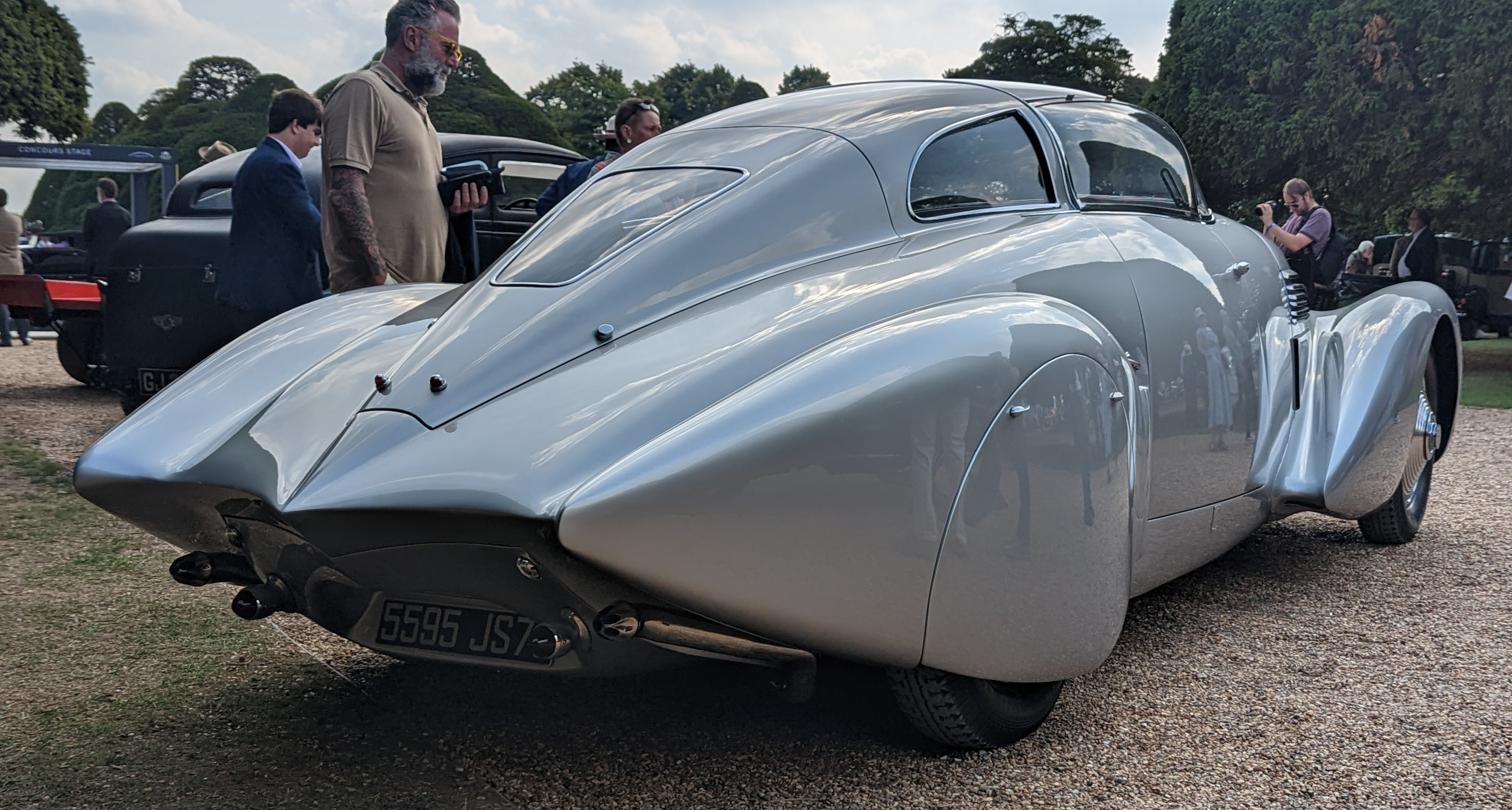
Rear three-quarters view

The exterior of the Dubonnet Xenia features many aviation and Art Deco inspired details owing to the time period and Dubonnet's history as a fighter pilot in World War I. These details include the wraparound windshield, said to be one of, if not the first, applications of a compound curved windshield on a car, as well as the large slatted grille extending below the long hood, and the unconventional "pantograph" doors that are attached to the car by a rectangular panel, and operate by swinging out and back towards the rear of the car, while remaining parallel to the body.

Dubonnet's focus on aerodynamics can also be seen in the exterior design of the car. The flared front fenders taper off in a teardrop shape towards the rear, as does the tail of the car. Notably, the Dubonnet Xenia has fender skirts that cover almost the entirety of the rear wheels to reduce drag, a technique pioneered 10 years earlier on a land speed record attempt car.

== Owners ==
The H6B Dubonnet Xenia began as André Dubonnet's personal car after it was finished in 1938. On the outbreak of World War II and the subsequent invasion of France in 1940, the Dubonnet Xenia was hidden. It resurfaced again on June 9, 1946, where it led a parade commemorating the opening of a highway tunnel in Saint-Cloud. In the 1960s, the car was bought and restored by Alain Balleret, president of the French Hispano-Suiza Club.

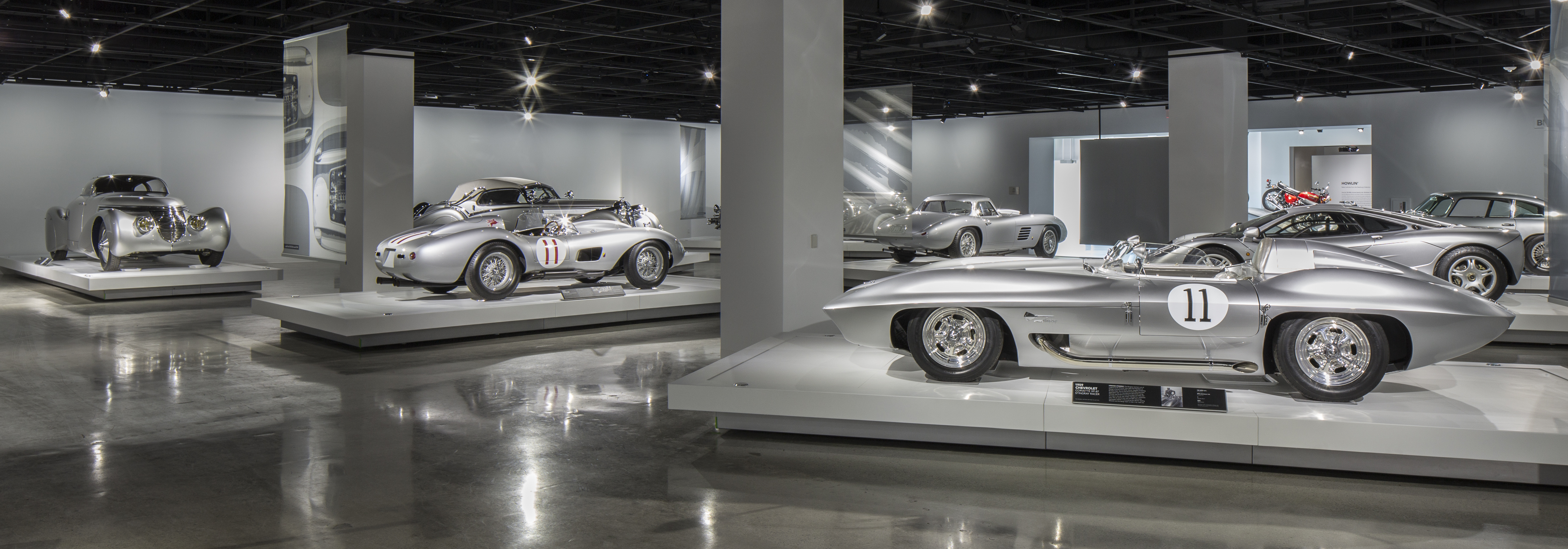
Dubonnet Xenia on display at the Petersen Automotive Museum in 2015 (far left)

In 1999, the car again changed hands when it was bought by American collector Charles Morse.

After being restored again by its new owner, the Dubonnet Xenia was displayed at the 2000 Pebble Beach Concours d'Elegance where it won the award for 'Most Elegant Enclosed Car'. It subsequently won Best in Show at the 2001 Amelia Island Concours d'Elegance.

In 2003, the Dubonnet Xenia was purchased by American businessman Peter W. Mullin. It has since been on display at the Mullin Automotive Museum in Oxnard, California, and has occasionally been loaned to other museums such as the Petersen Automotive Museum for exhibitions. Following Mullin's death, the car has been kept in the collection of the Petersen Automotive Museum.
