= Mazel Group Engineering =

Spanish design studio

Mazel Group Engineering is a Barcelona based design studio specialising in concept cars and engineering solutions.

== Concept cars ==
- Mazel Identity i1
- Mazel Sportiva Latina
- Mazel JAVX (a "Journey adventure vehicle")
- Mazel HS 21 GTS
- Mazel HS K8 Luxury Berlina
- Mazel HS 21

=== In collaboration ===
- Mazel-Lancia Granturismo Stilnovo
- Mazel-Nissan Micra Sport Concept Car
