= Hispano-Suiza T49 =

Car made by the Spanish company Hispano-Suiza between 1925 and 1944

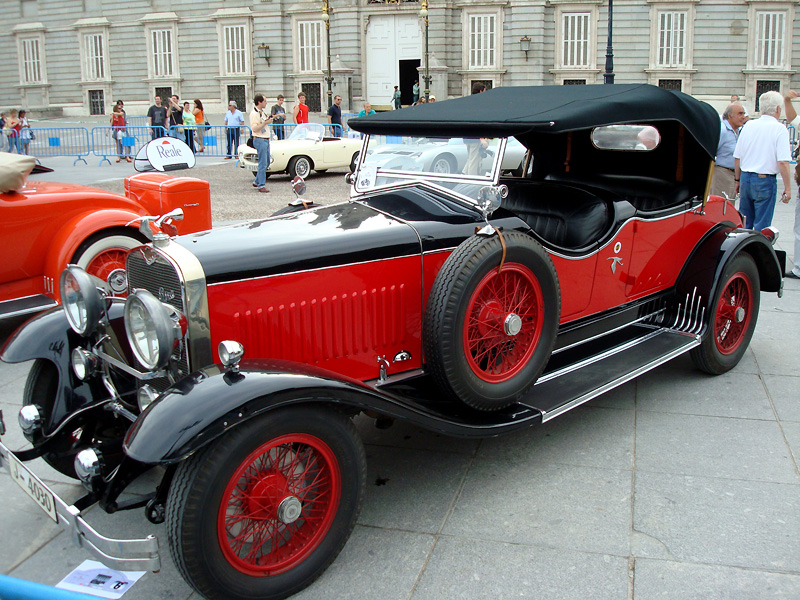
1929 Hispano-Suiza T49

The Hispano-Suiza T49 was a car manufactured by the Spanish company Hispano-Suiza between 1924 and 1944. It was a smaller version of the successful H6B model. It had a 6-cylinder engine of 3746 cc, 85 hp (63 kW) and a maximum speed of 120–135 km/h (75–84 mph) depending on wheelbase and body fitted. It featured four-wheel drum brakes, brake booster, and a three-speed gearshift with reverse.

In 1924 the T-49 prototype was tested by the company's president, Damián Mateu, who traveled from Barcelona to Paris with his driver on a two-day trip. With body type Coupé de Ville, The car was commissioned by the Spanish Royal House for the private service of Queen Maria Cristina.

One of two remaining, French-built I 6's

Developed in France, the manufacturing was completely Spanish. The chassis (engine, mechanics, axles, wheels, front and control panel) was produced at the La Sagrera factory beginning in December 1925. Six examples were also built in France as the Hispano-Suiza I 6, but this effort was soon abandoned as the car met with no market response there. The French production may have been only a pre-series run, to set up the manufacturing process.

The bodywork was designed by order. The main bodybuilders were Fiol, Farré, Roca and Badia, Mateu and Marrugat, and others. They remained in the production program until 1934.

== Related links ==
Fédération Internationale des Véhicules Anciens
