= Saoutchik =

French coachbuilding company

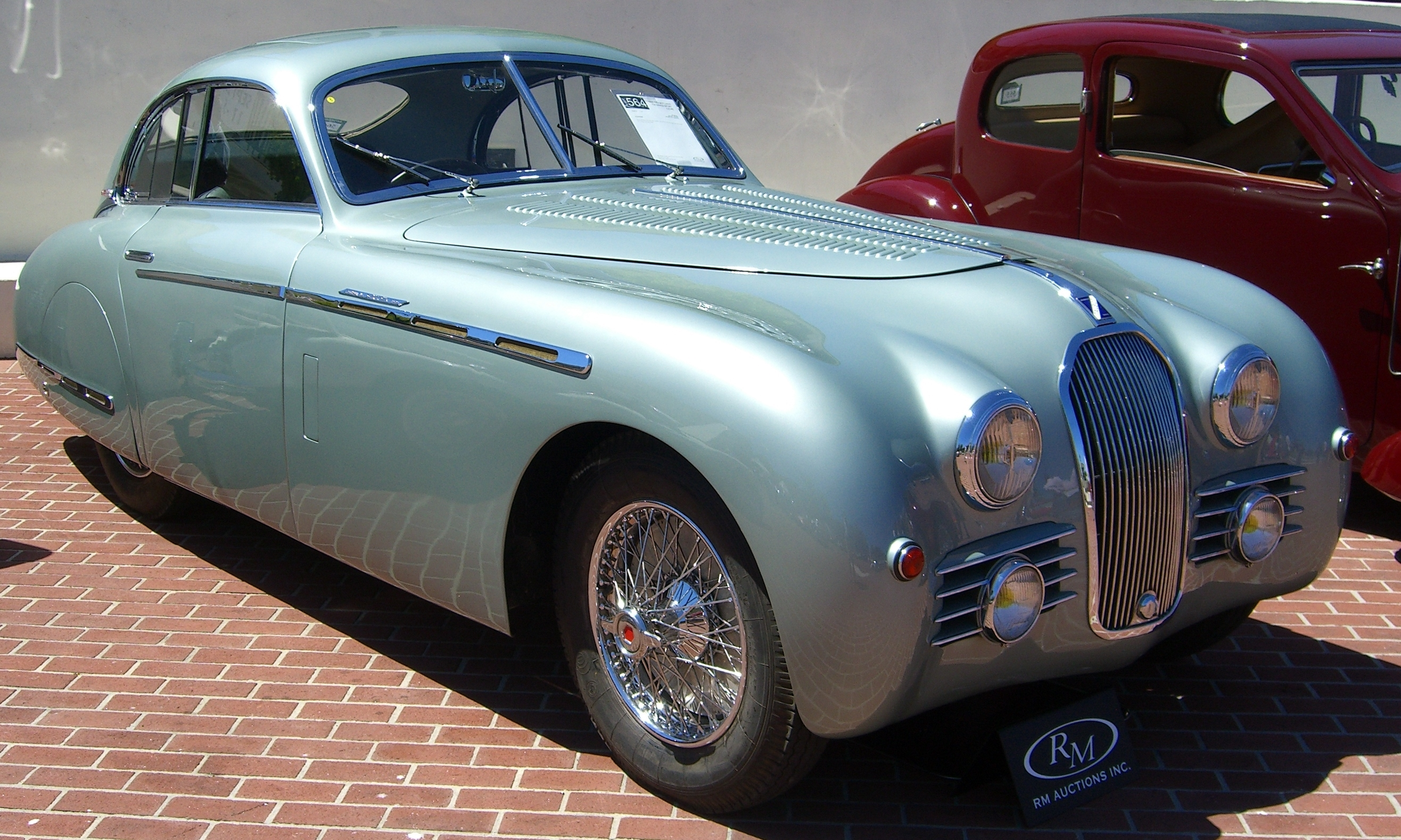
1950 Talbot Lago T26 Grand Sport Coupe by Saoutchik

Saoutchik was a French coachbuilding company founded in 1906 and based in Neuilly-sur-Seine near Paris. The company was one of the best-known coachbuilders in France in the 1920s and 1930s and, together with Figoni et Falaschi and Franay, is considered one of the most important representatives of the "Baroque" style in French coachwork in the 1930s and 1940s.

A new Saoutchik company was founded in 2016, and revealed its first new design in 2024.

== Iakov Saoutchik ==
Iakov Saoutchik (1880–1957) was born, depending on the source, in Ukraine or in Minsk (Belarus). Both were then part of the Russian Empire. The family emigrated to France in 1899, where Iakov completed an apprenticeship as a cabinetmaker and worked in this profession until 1906.

== Early history ==
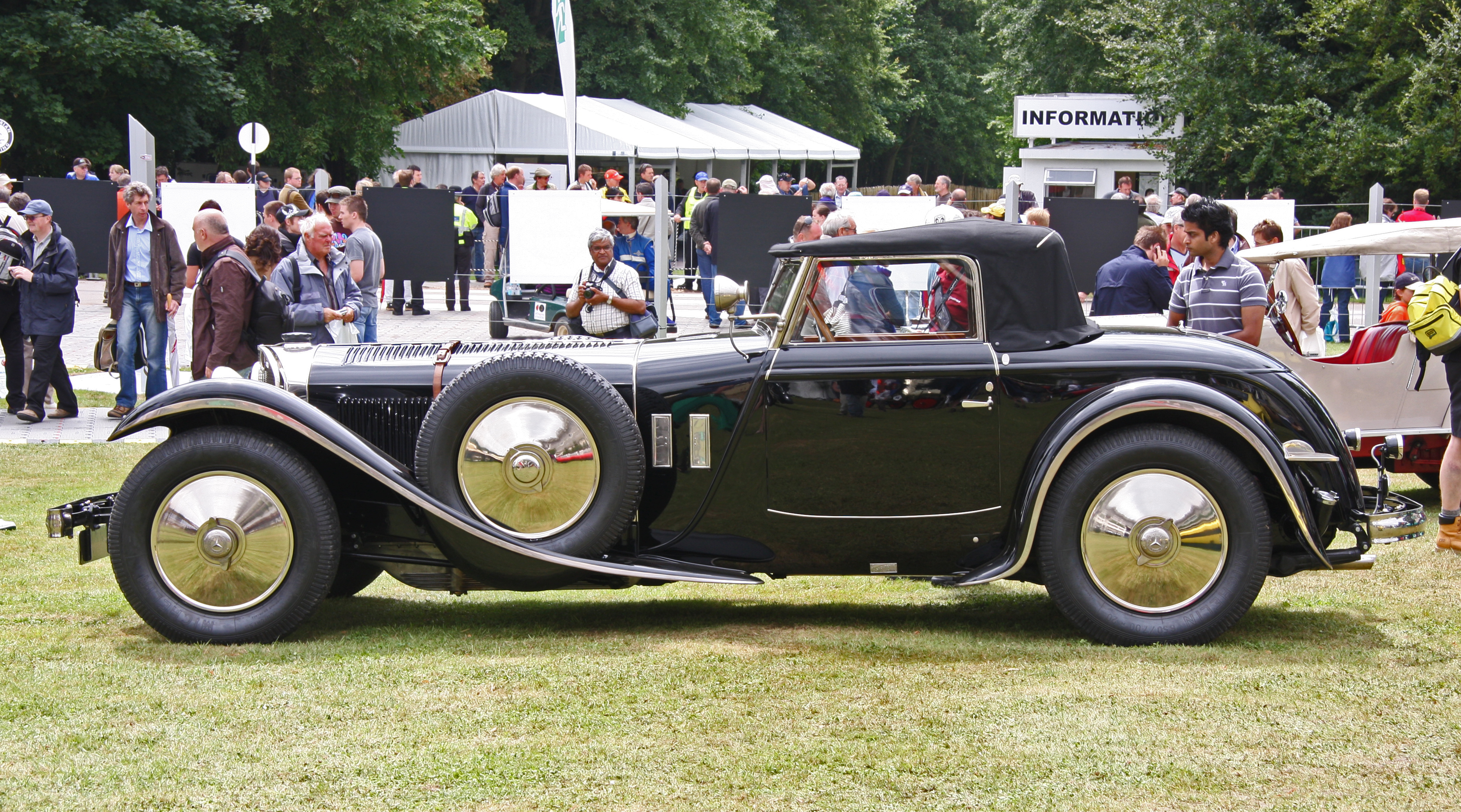
Mercedes-Benz 680S Torpedo Roadster by Saoutchik (1927)

In the year 1906, Saoutchik married and became self-employed as a coachbuilder. He belonged to the minority of coachbuilders without roots in carriage building. The workshop was on de rue Dulud. Supposedly, the first chassis he bodied was an Isotta Fraschini, while the oldest known surviving car bodied by Saoutchik is a 1907 Clément-Bayard 10CV. Saoutchik's ambition was to become one of the leading providers of individually manufactured car bodies. He achieved his goal in just a few years and remained at the forefront of the coachbuilding industry internationally until the decline of individual coachbuilding after the Second World War.

== History ==
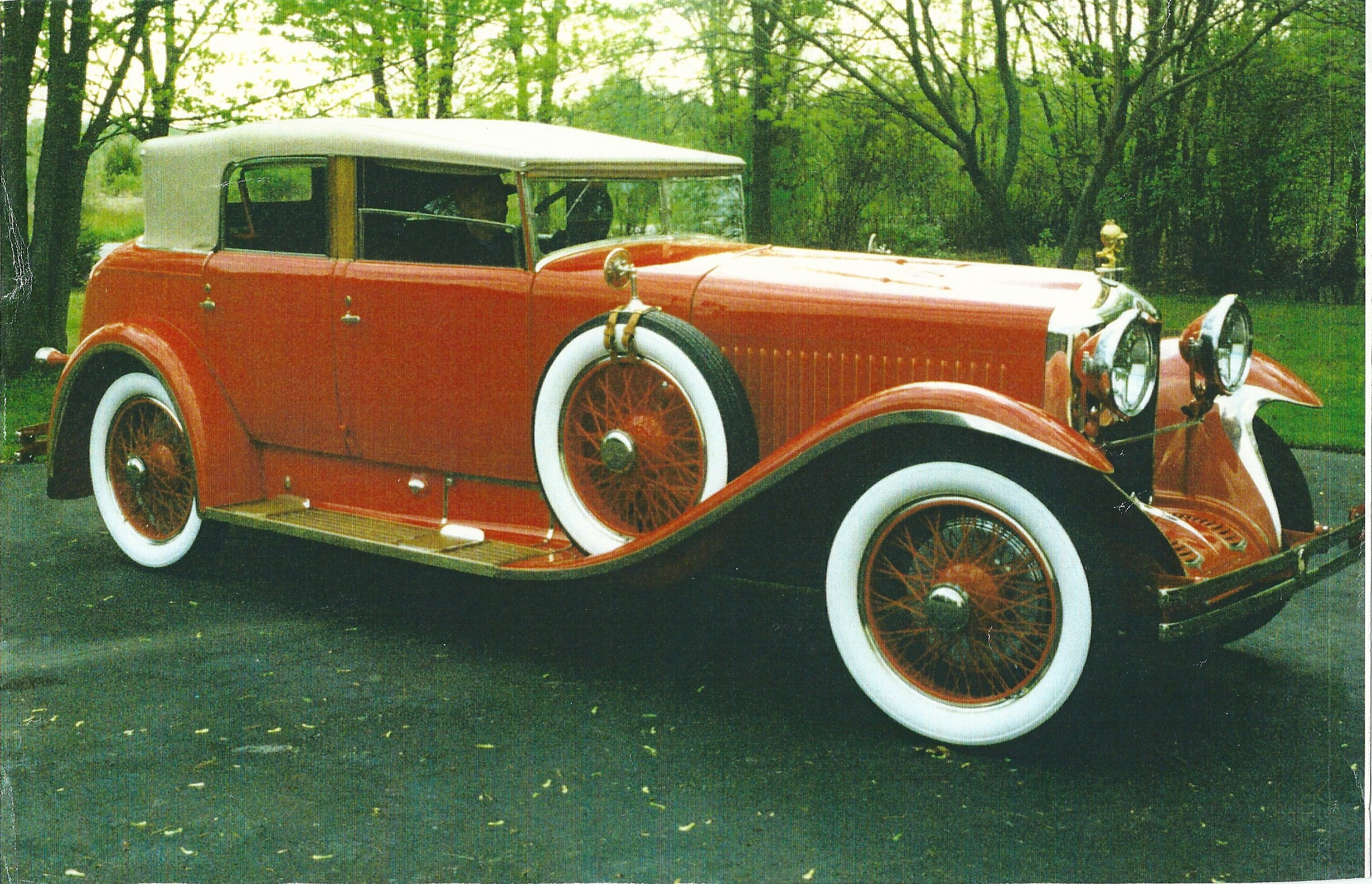
Minerva Type AK Berline Transformable by Saoutchik (1927)

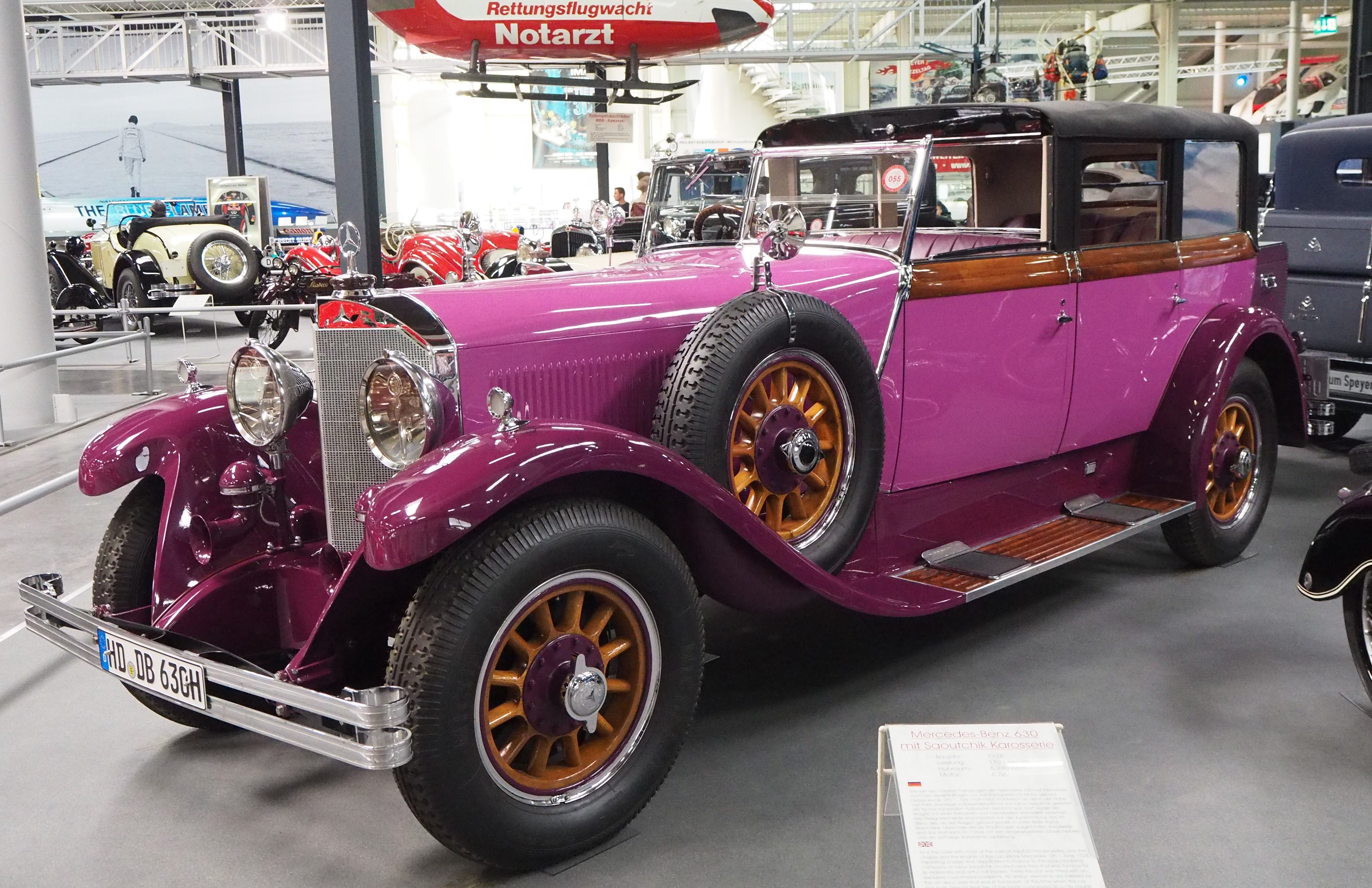
Mercedes-Benz 24/100/140hp Berline Transformable by Saoutchik (1928)

Saoutchik was among the first to make transformables. These are large and complex four-door cars with a fully opening top and complete weather protection through retractable side windows; This is where they differ from a torpedo or phaeton. In contrast to the convertible sedan, there are no fixed side window frames or roof bars. These structures, known in the USA as convertible sedans, therefore present the body builders with special requirements in terms of stability, rigidity and operability of the top.

Saoutchik was one of the most famous body manufacturers in France in the 1920s and 1930s. During this time he created a number of bodies for large Mercedes-Benz chassis. In addition to transformables, these were also roadsters called Torpedo breveté (breveté means "patented"). In search of "visual magic", Saoutchik began to emphasize the main lines of his designs with nickel-plated, later chrome-plated and occasionally wooden appliqués. Saoutchik also built bodies for some Hispano-Suiza, Panhard & Levassor and Renault 40CV chassis; These were usually more conservative but elegant designs. Another preserved design from this era is a Rolls-Royce Phantom II (68 GN), which Saoutchik very modestly dressed up as a Cabriolet de Ville (a synonym for transformable) in 1930. The vehicle is painted black and has subtle Art Deco decorations; Inside, brocade paneling on the rear doors and elaborate ornaments and appliqués. The customers for these vehicles tended to prefer coachbuilders such as Binder, Felber, Kellner, Million-Guiet, Hibbard & Darrin or Fernandez & Darrin.

Later, Saoutchik also took risks in terms of design. He was one of the pioneers of extremely low slung bodies. In the early 1930s he attracted attention with such designs, which, however, appeared somewhat more playful than the conceptually similar, formally strict structures of contemporary Voisin.

=== Bentley 6 ½ Litre (1929) ===
A suspected Saoutchik construction on a Cadillac V16 chassis around 1930 has not yet been verified, but there is a Bentley 6 ½ liter from 1929 with a short chassis that an American customer had bodied by Saoutchik. The chosen structure was a three-position convertible in which the top could be opened fully or partially (only over the front seats), and there was also an integrated trunk. Saoutchik incorporated both French and British style elements and used nickel silver appliqués.

=== Bucciali "Fleche d’Or" ===
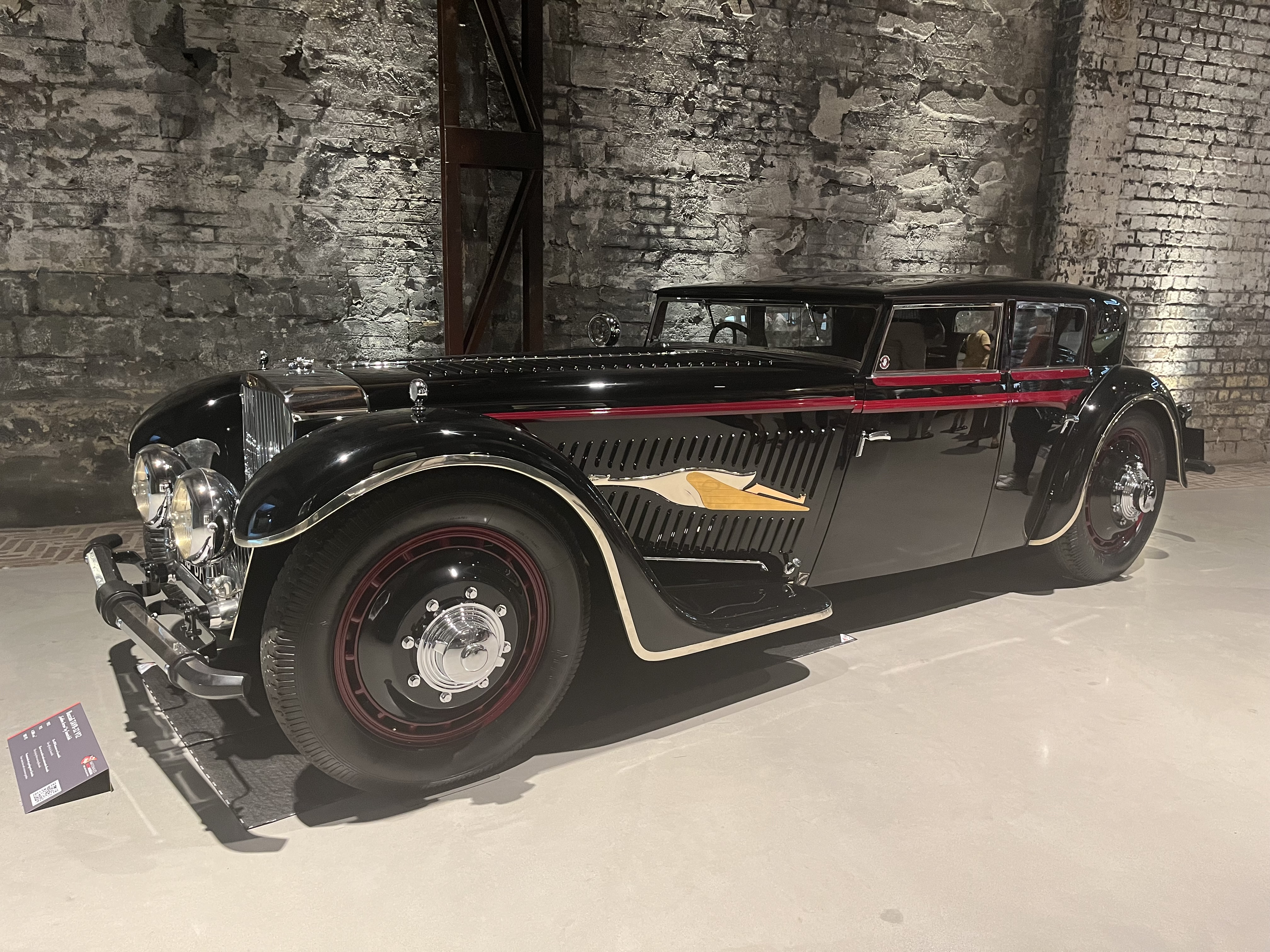
Bucciali TAV8-32 Berline "Fleche d'Or"

An extreme example of the formally strict and low style of these years is the Berline TAV 12 “Flèche d’Or”, which was built in 1932 on a Bucciali chassis and was only 1.48 meters high with a length of 6.36 meters. This was possible due to the front-wheel drive layout of the Bucciali. This eliminated the cardan shaft and thus the main reason for the large distance between the vehicle floor and the road. Bucciali was, along with Tracta, one of the pioneers of this concept in the 1920s, but the TAV8-32 (also called TAV12 because of the V12 valve engine from Voisin with 4886 cm³ displacement that was originally ordered by the customer) was the largest front-wheel drive car built to date, and outperformed the (series-built) American Cord L-29 and Ruxton, the two other most popular front wheel drive automobiles at the time. The hood took up almost half of the vehicle's length. The intention of the ultra-low body was supported by huge wheels; the panes were more like visual slits. There were "helmet-shaped" fenders (so-called because of their profile) and no running boards. In order not to disturb the body lines, the two spare wheels were placed in the rear, but it was accepted that this would worsen the traction of the vehicle. On the side, there were ornaments in the shape of a flying stork along the entire length of the hood, almost an antithesis to the strict formalism of the rest of the structure.

The original drawings of the Flèche d’Or (“Golden Arrow”) go back to Paul-Albert Bucciali.

== Competition with Figoni Et Falaschi ==
A respectful competition arose with the other main creator of the "baroque" design language in coachbuilding, Figoni et Falaschi. The now preferred brands were Delahaye and Talbot-Lago, for whose chassis Figoni & Falaschi also built numerous bodies.

For a few years, this competition shaped car fashion and the development of French individual body construction, the "Americanization" of which Jacques Saoutchik complained about in 1935. In fact, these influences can be clearly seen in vehicles from Renault, Mathis or Rosengart. However, the response of the French coachbuilders also led to occasional excesses with shapes that are now perceived as pompous and exaggerated. During this time, both Saoutchik and Figoni & Falaschi won many awards at the Concours d'Elegance for their creations and remained in business despite the economic crisis.

=== Hispano-Suiza J12 and K6 ===
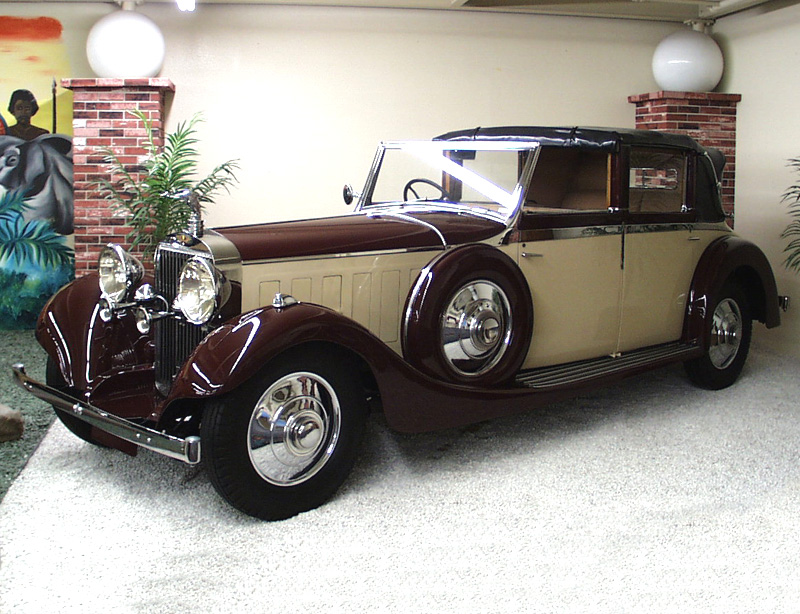
Very reservedly shaped Berline Transformable on a Hispano-Suiza J12 chassis (1935)

Saoutchik designed a number of bodies for the J12 and K6, designed rather conservatively to suit the conservative tastes of customers. Most J12s received representative bodies - chauffeur-driven limousines, landaulets or transformables . A two-seater convertible with a "mother-in-law seat" was created for a French industrialist. The vehicle was then owned by Pablo Picasso for a long time. In the 1970s it was the model for a model that the Italian manufacturer Rio released.

In 2010, a Saoutchik Transformable on a 1936 J12 chassis (#28543 43) was auctioned for US$1.54 million.

In 1935, a very elegant convertible was created based on the "small" Hispano-Suiza K6, which has been preserved.

=== "Pantograph" doors ===
In the mid-1930s, Jacques Saoutchik patented a new kind of hinge system, which he called the "pantograph" in reference to the drawing device. With this special form of sliding door, the door is supported and guided by struts. When opening it is first pulled out to the side and, when it is far enough away from the body, pulled parallel to it forwards or backwards until it completely clears the door opening. When closed, the special functionality of the "Pantograph" door can only be recognized by the unusual position of the door handle in the middle of the optical longitudinal axis of the door leaf. Very few vehicles were equipped with this door system. Two otherwise rather conservative convertibles are known; the one on the chassis of a Delage D8-120 from 1939 could not be completed before the outbreak of war and was only delivered to the Élysée Palace in 1945 . It served as President Charles de Gaulle 's first government vehicle. The vehicle, which was originally painted black, like all government vehicles, has been preserved and was presented in a red-bronze color for a long time. Although this change was probably not made by Saoutchik, it is in his tradition; he was one of the first French coachbuilders to work with metallic paints. Today the car is finished in silver over black.

The other known convertible with "pantograph" doors appears to no longer exist. Saoutchik built it on the chassis of the eight-cylinder Renault Suprastella model for the future general Marie-Pierre Kœnig (1898–1970).

=== Dubonnet Xenia (1938) ===
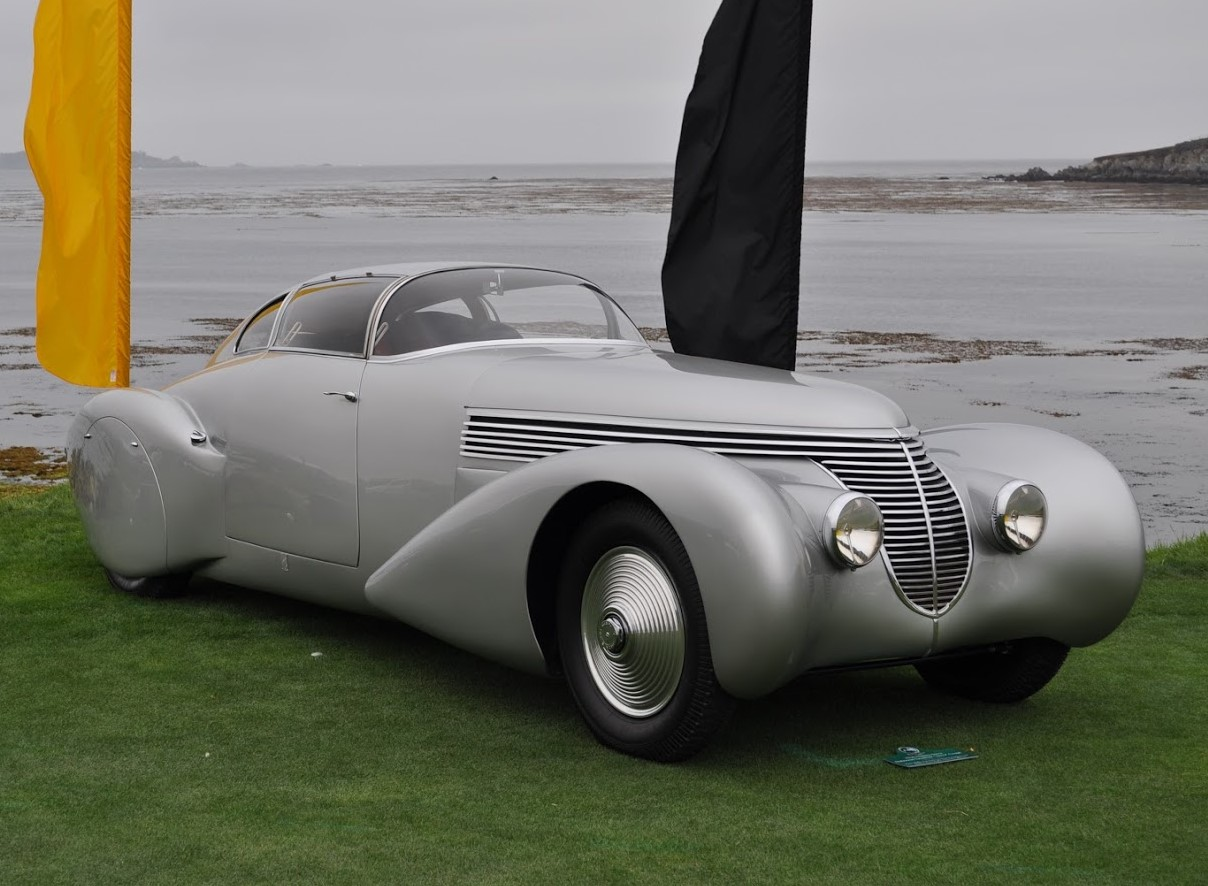
1938 Hispano-Suiza H6B Dubonnet Xenia

One of Saoutchik's most famous bodies of this time is the Dubonnet Xenia, created in 1938, a test vehicle on which the engineer and racing driver André Dubonnet tested a further development of his Hyperflex Dubonnet suspension. The chassis came from a Hispano-Suiza H6 built in 1932, which Dubonnet had acquired in 1934, and was converted accordingly. It also subsequently received hydraulic brakes .

Ironically, “Xenia” is not a Saoutchik design; The drawings were provided by the designer and aerodynamics specialist Jean Édouard Andreau. Due to the special design, the vehicle has a very early version of a panoramic windshield.

=== Jaguar SS 100 (1938) ===
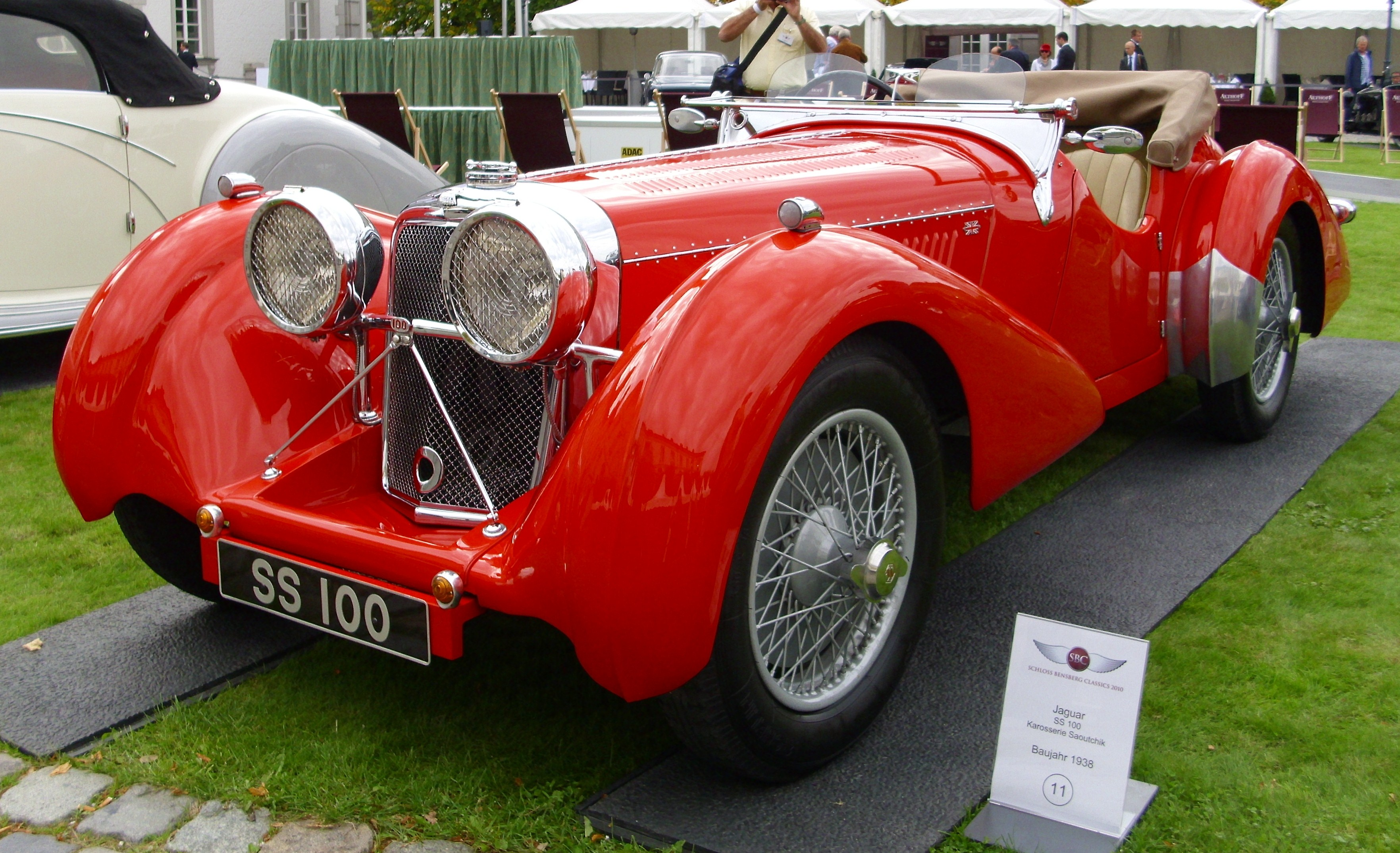
Jaguar SS100 Roadster Saoutchik (1938)

Also in 1938, Saoutchik created a one-off, more conservative roadster body on the chassis of a Jaguar SS100. Saoutchik's body, fitted to an early 3½ liter chassis (#39107), leaves the hood, radiator grille and headlights with their characteristic struts untouched. The massive fenders are striking and typical, while the rear is longer and more curvaceous than the factory body. The SS Jaguar has some design similarities to the “Trossi-SSK”. Like that car, the Saoutchik Jaguar also appears larger than the original model. The vehicle still exists.

=== Bentley Mark V Cabriolet (1939–1940) ===
In 1940, Saoutchik bodied one of the few Bentley Mark V chassis (#MXT 3). It belonged to the sister of King Farouk of Egypt and was actually intended to be bodied by the coachbuilder Binder, where it arrived immediately before the outbreak of war. It was hidden from German access for a while. The very conservative lines suggest that a design by Binder was used.

== After World War 2 ==
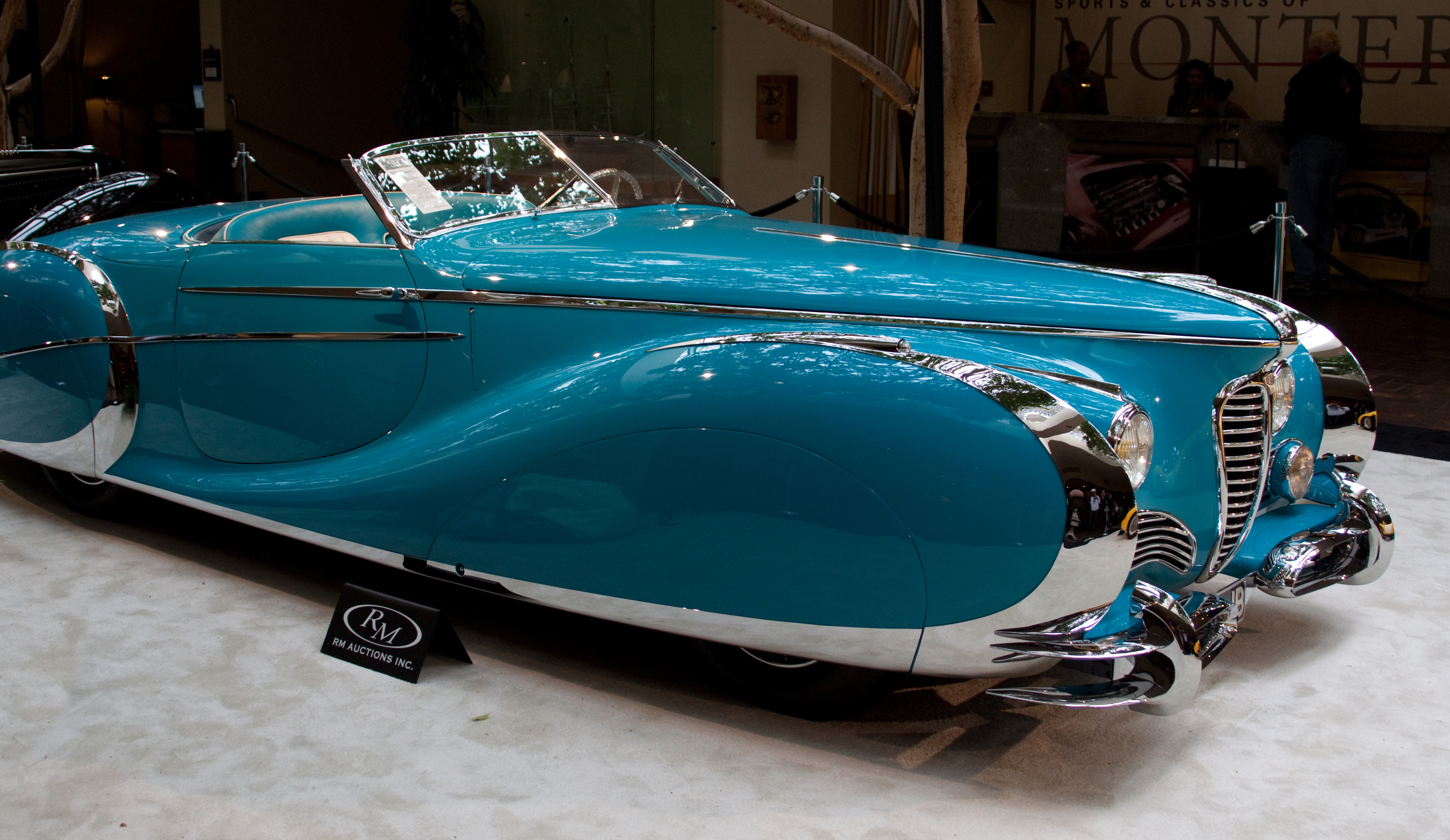
1949 Delahaye 175S Roadster by Saoutchik

After the Second World War, business declined more and more as automobile manufacturers increasingly offered self-supporting bodies that they manufactured in-house. The rivalry with Figoni & Falaschi continued briefly after the war, now joined by designs from Franay, Gurney-Nutting, Freestone and Webb and a newcomer, Facel-Métallon. The latter would soon make a name for itself with its own car brand, Facel Vega.

The dwindling market and the need to attract the attention of customers drove these coachbuilders to more extravagant designs. These vehicles were less practical as well, with the weight of the opulent bodies making even the sporty vehicles slow and thirsty, and the oversized fenders and bumpers putting a strain on the front axle, which made the steering (without power assistance ) more difficult. At the same time, the center of gravity of the vehicles shifted forward, which worsened the traction of the rear-wheel drive vehicles. Casing on the front wheels also led to a worsened turning circle, which made the car more unwieldy. Fewer and fewer customers were willing to do all this for a lot of money. The difficult times after the war were anything but suitable for showing off in such an extravagant car. In Saoutchik's home market of France, the de Gaulle government also introduced a very high luxury tax, which not only sealed the fate of many car brands, but also forced coachbuilders to give up.

=== Cadillac Sixty Two ===
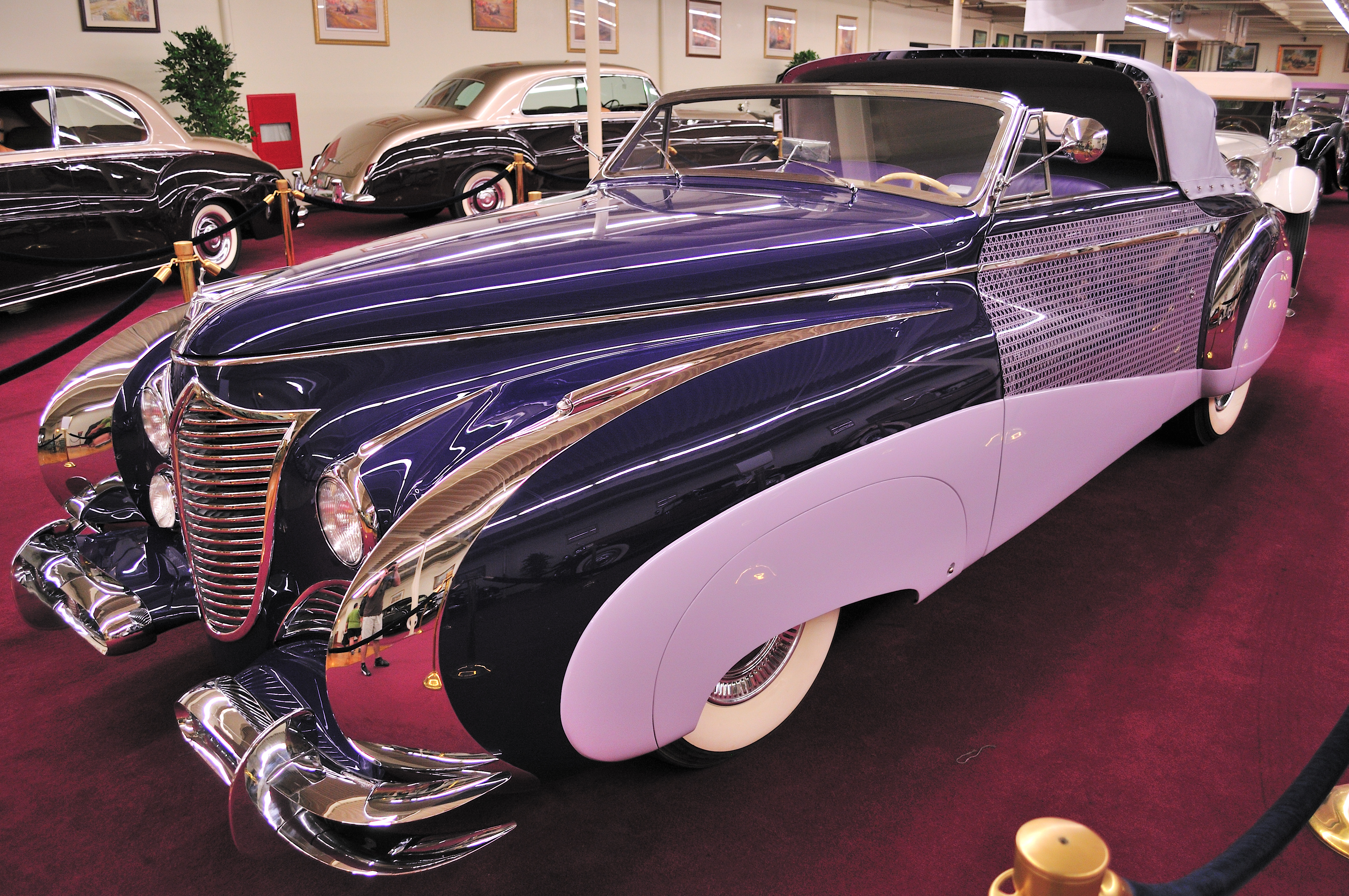
Cadillac Series 62 three-position convertible Saoutchik (1948)

Saoutchik built a Cadillac (#46237307) in 1948 as an extravagant convertible. The convertible body of this vehicle is very striking with similar lines to those found on Saoutchik's Delages and Delahayes. They were combined with more appliqués than ever: wide chrome strips run across the top of the fenders, and the wattle above the doors is a stylistic device already used in carriage construction. The radiator mask was modeled on a shield. The car still exists and fetched US$649,000 at auctions in 2006 and 2010.

=== Talbot-Lago ===
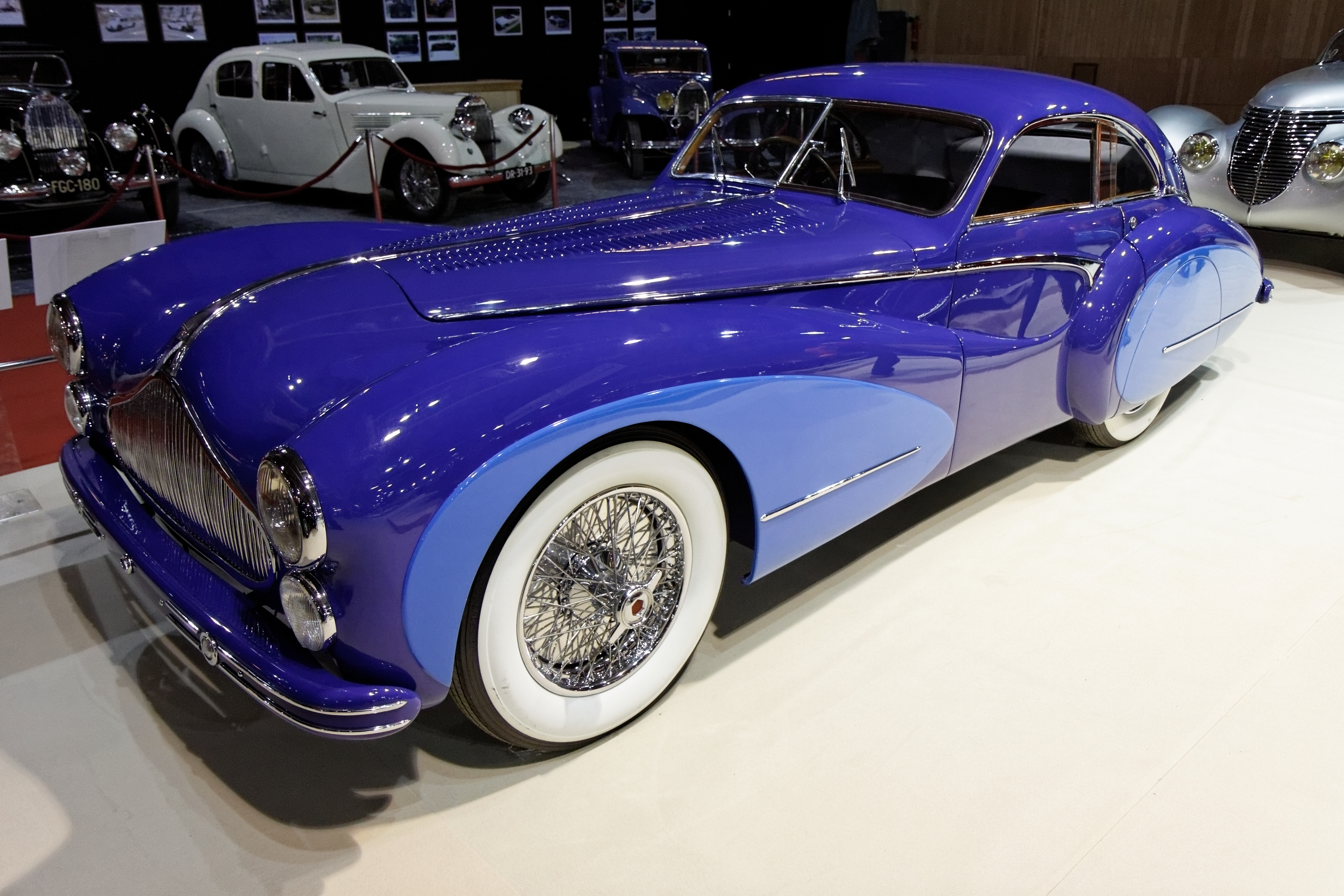
Talbot Lago Type 26 Grand Sport Coupé by Saoutchik (1947)

After Antonio Lago separated the factory in Suresnes from the bankruptcy estate of the British Sunbeam-Talbot-Darracq Group (STD) in 1932, a realignment took place with a tighter product range, sportier models and a racing program that, for cost reasons, consisted of near-production vehicles. Talbot-Lago were robust and also fast with their initially 2.7 to 3 liter six-cylinder engines with OHV valve control and hemispherical combustion chambers. One of the most powerful versions was the Type 26 Grand Sport with a four-liter engine and an output of almost 200 bhp. The brand's chassis were soon popular with Saoutchik's competitors Figoni & Falaschi and Chapron, the latter producing very stylish and reserved convertibles and coupés and Figoni & Falaschi, on the one hand, maintaining their "baroque style" and on the other hand with the famous Goutte d'eau ("drops of water") Coupés found a completely new design language. Saoutchik's designs lie between these creations; They are very elegant and nowhere near as expansive as the Delahaye.

After the discontinuation of Bugatti, Delage and Delahaye, Talbot-Lago was for a short time the last French provider of large-volume sports cars in the Bentley price range.

=== Delahaye Type 235 ===
When Delahaye attempted to regain a foothold in the luxury market with the Type 235, a further development of the Type 135, several of the remaining coachbuilders presented their ideas on this chassis, including Antem, Chapron, Figoni & Falaschi and, of course, Saoutchik.

The transitional period to modernity is shown by a sporty cabriolet from 1951, whose fender line is still indicated. In 1953, a pillarless coupé, which in a less radical form would probably have been called a hardtop or faux-cabriolet, showed the path envisioned by Paul Saoutchik, who had taken over the company from his father the previous year. It had an elongated fastback rear end with an implied pointed tail and lots of glass. The fender line can also be found on contemporary BMWs and Buicks.

However, the market had changed and hardly anyone was still interested in such hand-built and therefore very expensive vehicles. Objectively speaking, there were cheaper, modern designs that were significantly more powerful than these Grandes Routières, which had actually long since reached the end of their development cycle.

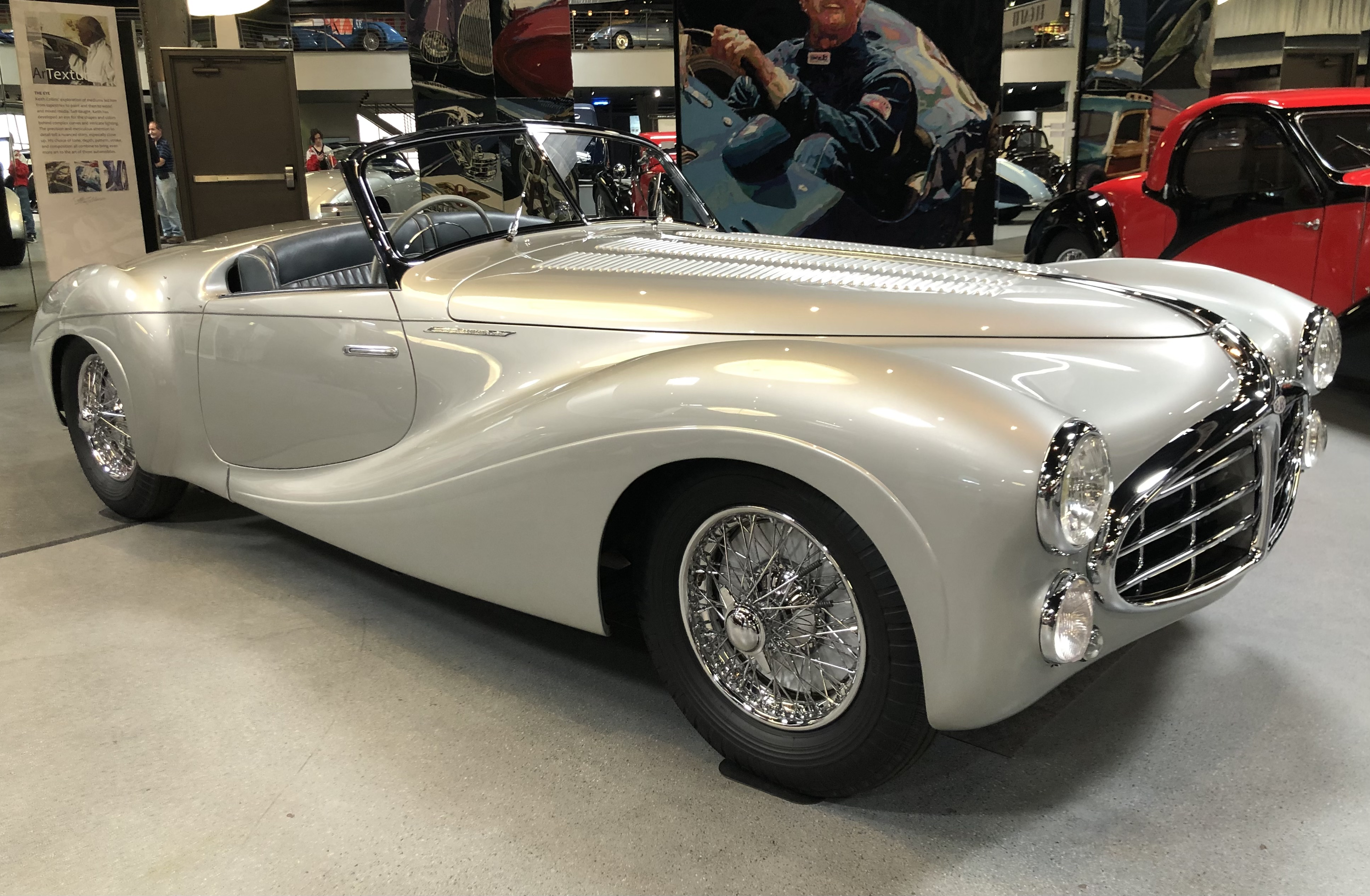
Delahaye Type 235 Cabriolet Saoutchik (1951)

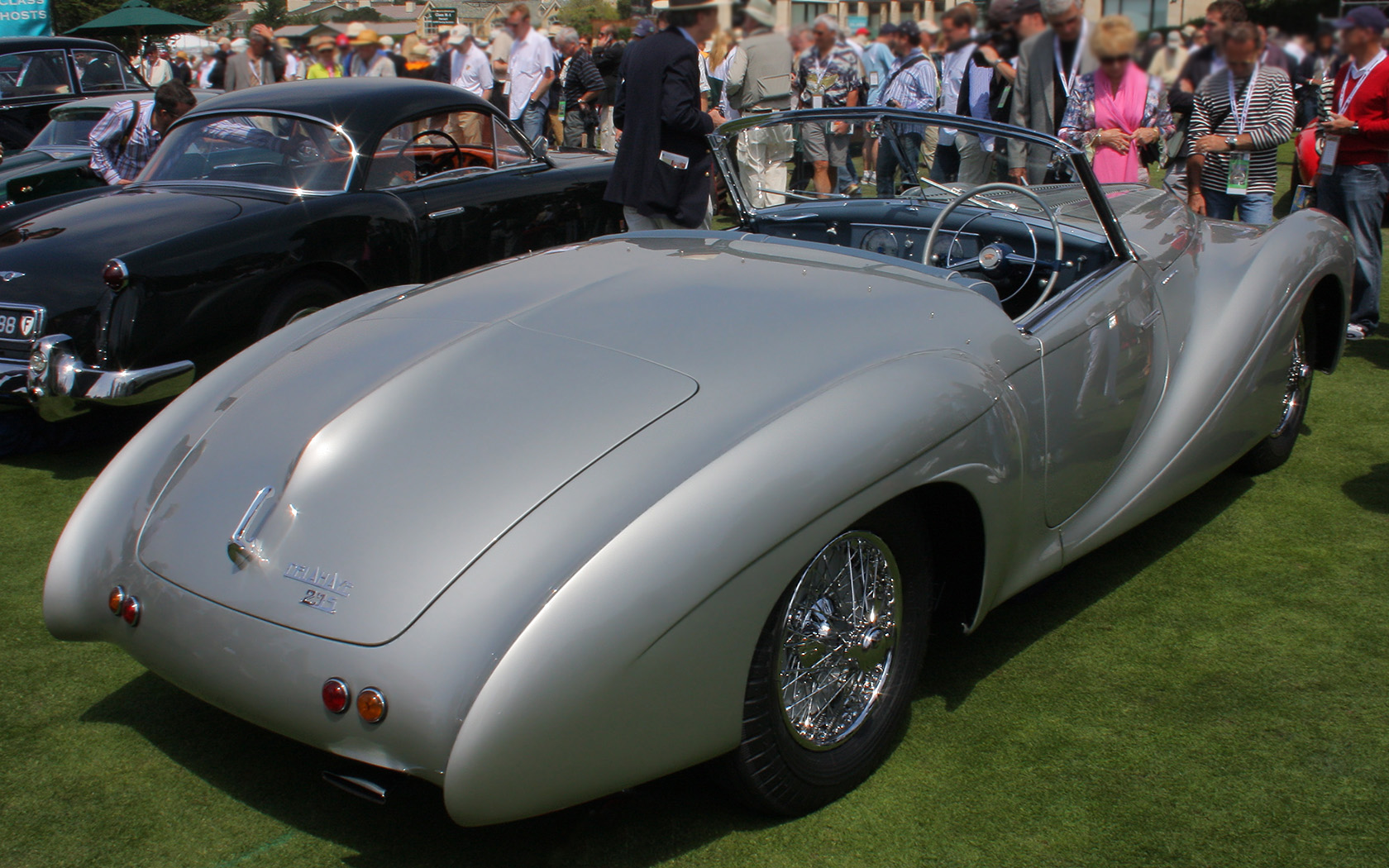
Delahaye Type 235 Cabriolet Saoutchik (1951) (rear)

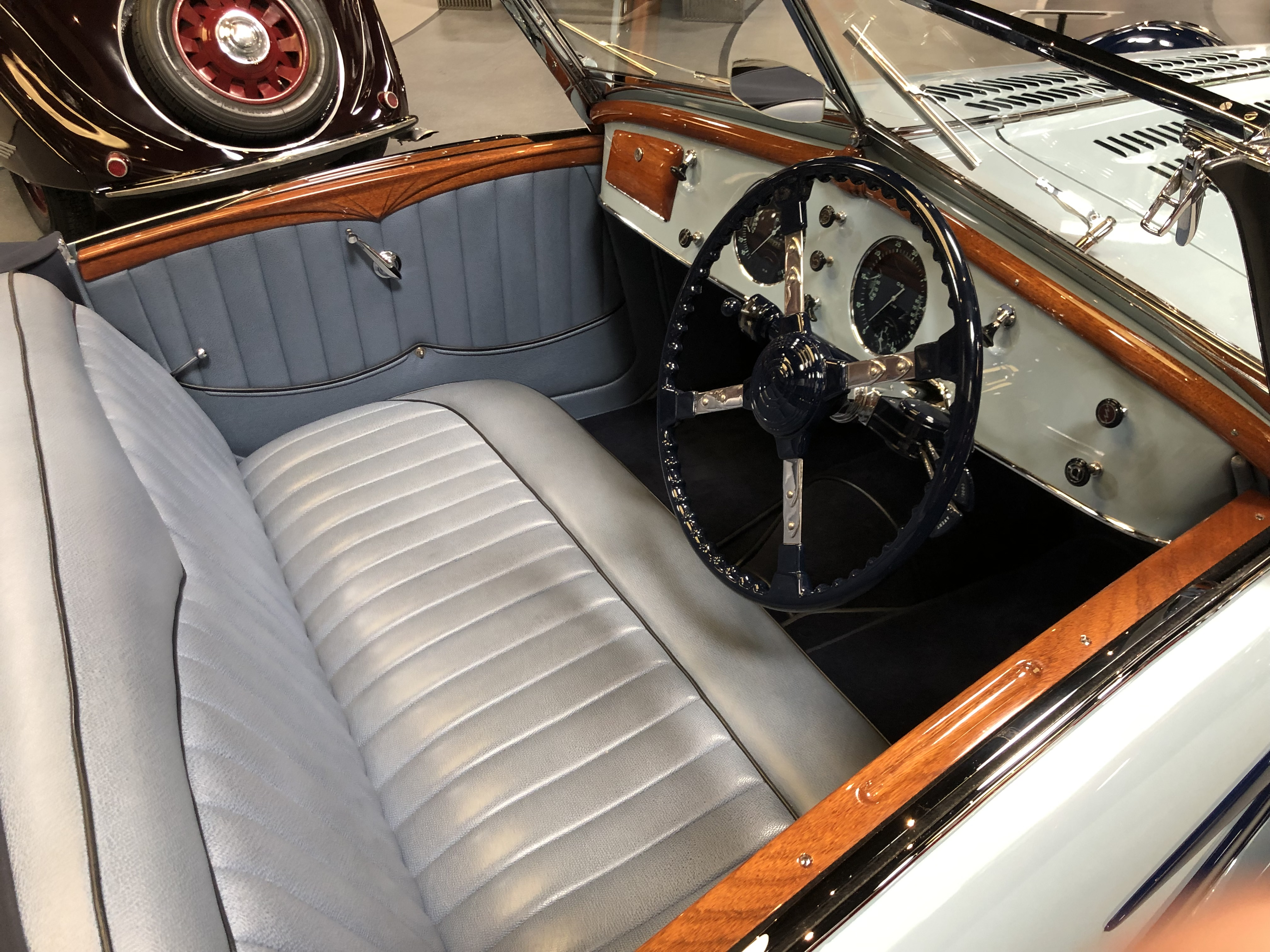
Delahaye Type 235 Cabriolet Saoutchik interior

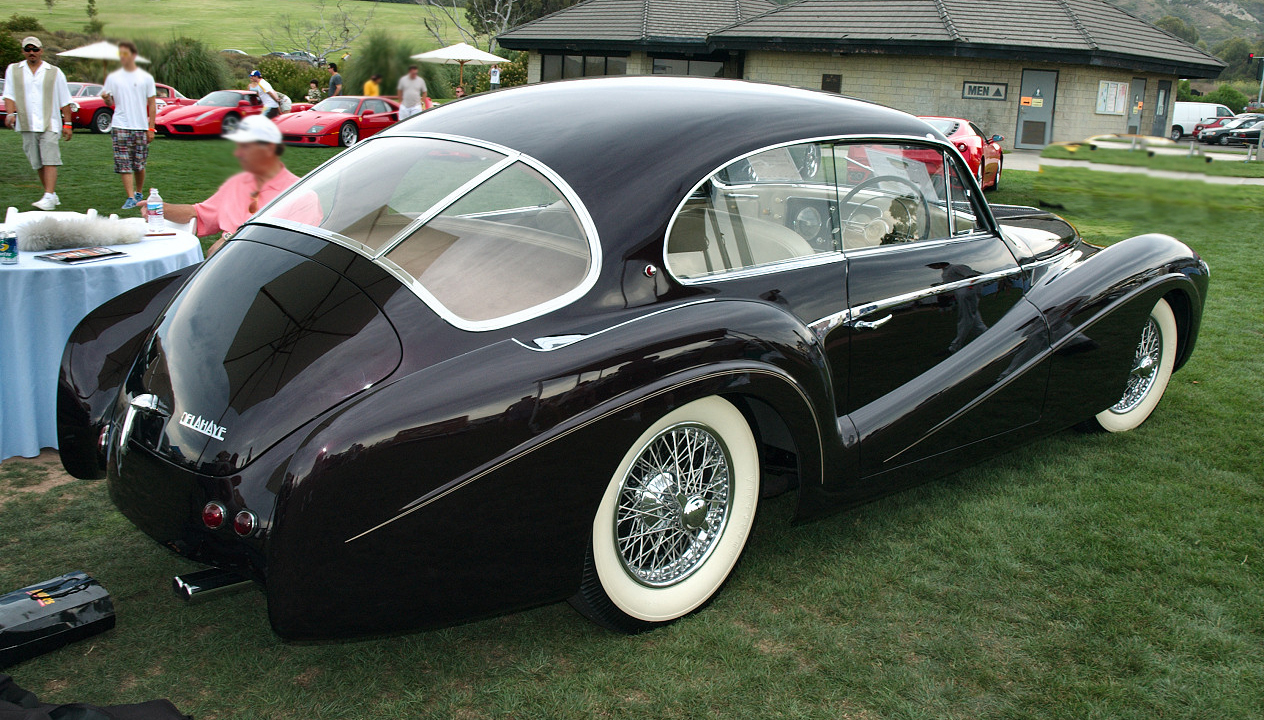
Radical design on a Delahaye Type 235, possibly by Paul Saoutchik (1953)

=== Pegaso Z-102 ===
In 1938, automobile production by Hispano-Suiza in France was discontinued, while it was continued in Spain. General Franco nationalized this division after the war as ENASA (Empresa nacional autocamiones sociedad anonima). Initially, car production was discontinued, and the company concentrated solely on commercial vehicles, which were sold under the brand name Pegaso.

Pegaso briefly entered into making sports cars with the high-performance Z-102, produced from 1951 to 1957. No more than 100 vehicles were produced during this period. Most of them were bodied by Carroceria Serra in Barcelona, Carrozzeria Touring and Saoutchik. Each car has individual details, with Saoutchik making a variety of styles of bodies for the platform.

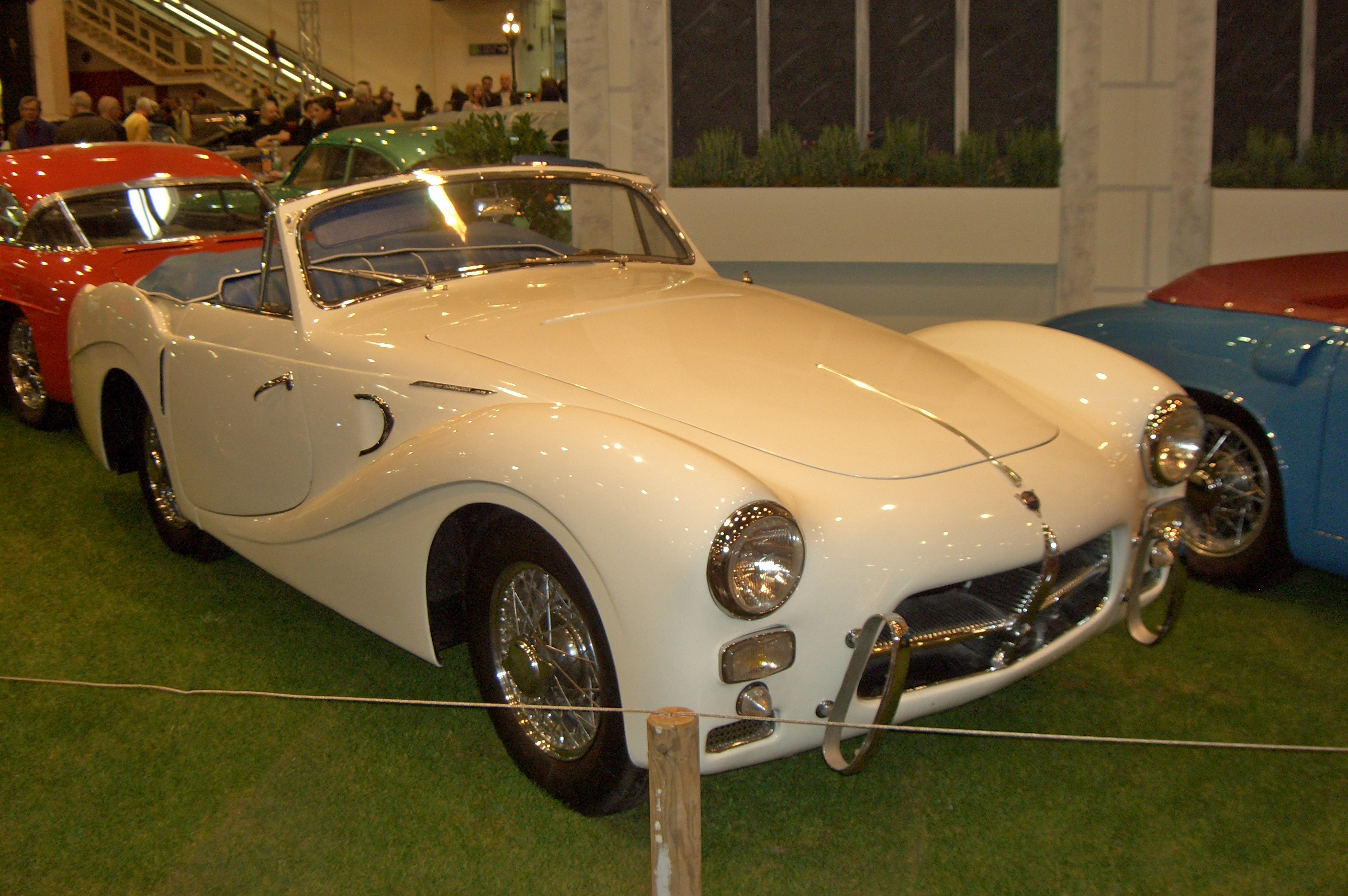
An early Pegaso Z-102 Spyder from Saoutchik

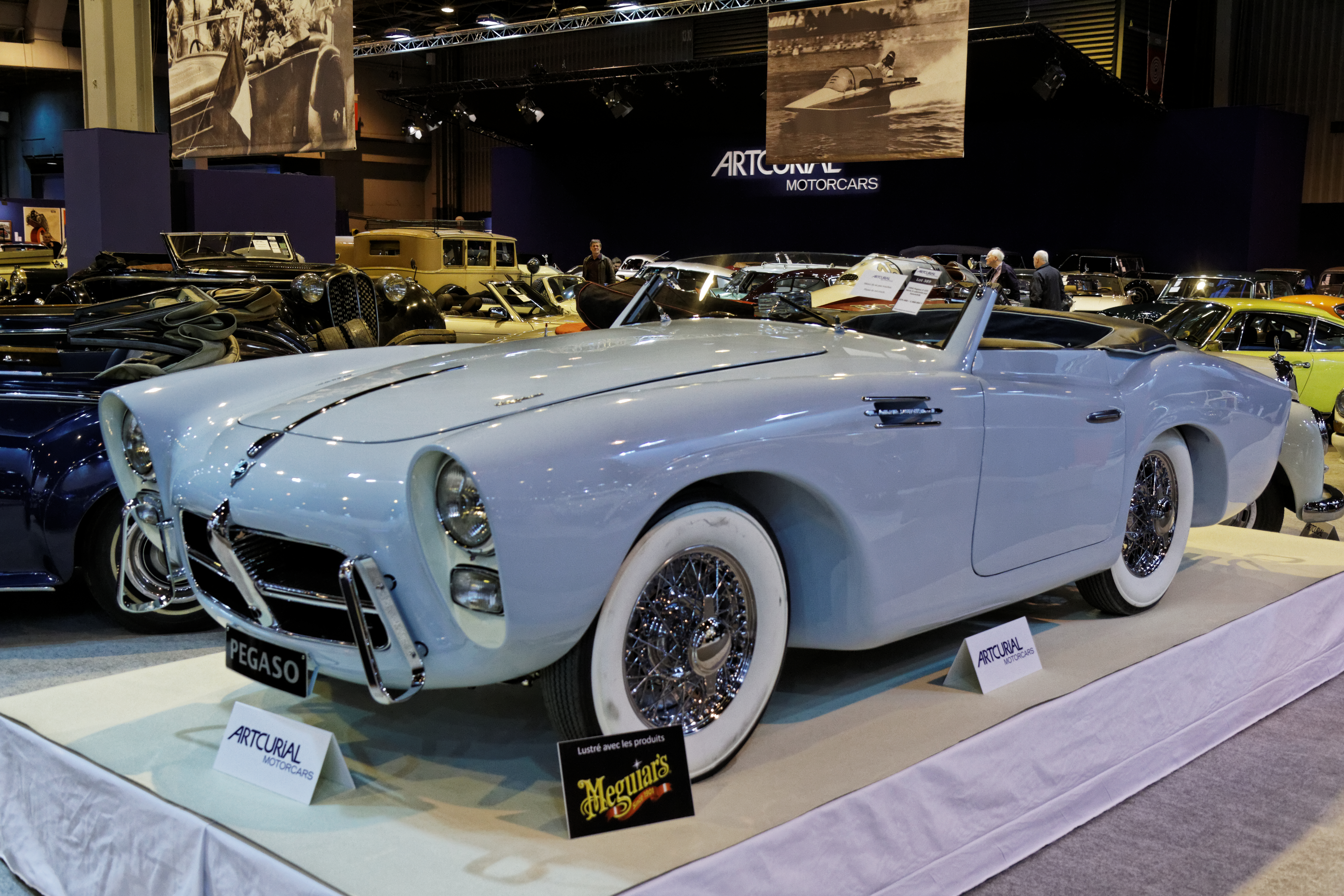
1954 Pegaso Z-102 Series II Spyder by Saoutchik

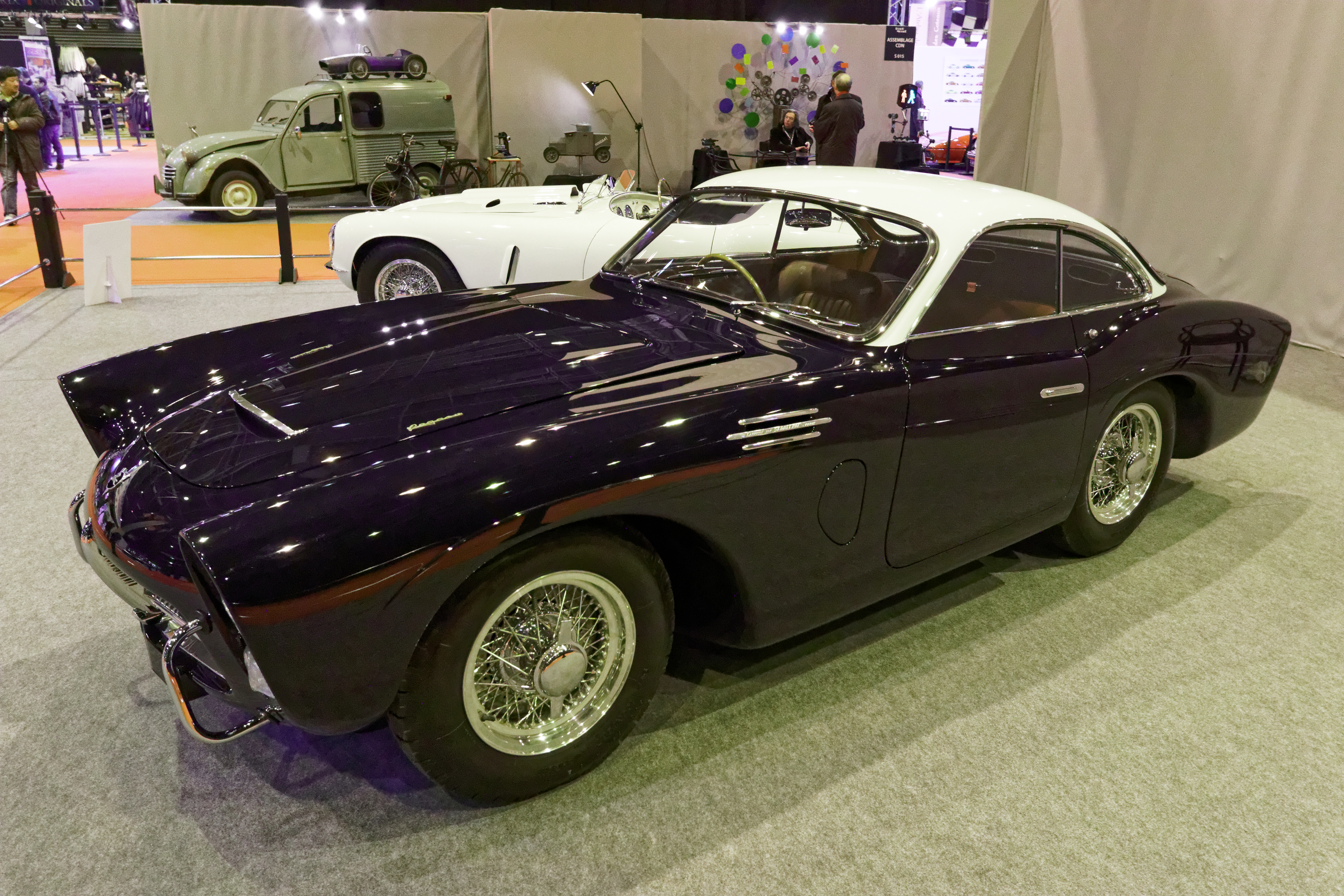
1954 Pegazo Z-102 Coupe by Saoutchik

== Paul Saoutchik ==
In 1952, Jacques' son Paul Saoutchik took over the management of the company. He too was unable to buck the zeitgeist. After the war, too few customers still had enough money to afford expensive special bodies for their cars. In 1955, the Saoutchik company ceased operations.

== Revival ==
In 2016, a new Saoutchik company was established in the Netherlands, specialising in automotive design and engineering and industrial design. In 2024, the company partnered with Ugur Sahin Design and revealed the Saoutchik 300 GTC, a sports car inspired by the Mercedes-Benz 300SL and Mercedes-Benz 680S, based on the current generation Mercedes-Benz SL. The body panels will be constructed from carbon fibre, supplied by German firm Pogea Racing. Production will be limited to 15 units, and aimed at "extremely discerning clients", according to the company.

== List of known chassis with Saoutchik bodies ==
- Austin A125
- Bentley Mark VI
- Bucciali TAV 3, TAV 8, TAV 30
- Bugatti Type 57
- Cadillac Sixty Two
- Charron 15CV
- Chenard-Walcker Aigle 8
- Delage (multiple models, including D8-120)
- Delahaye Type 134, Type 135, Type 175, Type 235
- Delaunay-Belleville 18CV
- Duesenberg Model J
- Farman 40CV
- Graham 97
- Hispano-Suiza H6, K6 and J12
- Hotchkiss Antheor, 2050, AM2
- Hupmobile
- Isotta Fraschini Tipo 8A
- Jaguar SS100
- Lorraine-Dietrich (multiple models)
- Matford 13CV
- Maybach Zeppelin (DS7, DS8)
- Mercedes 24/100/140 PS (Typ K) and Mercedes-Benz 630S, W06 (S, SS, SSK), W29 (500K)
- Minerva Type AK
- Panhard & Levassor (multiple models)
- Pegaso Z-102
- Pic-Pic
- Renault 40CV, Reinastella, Nervastella, Suprastella
- Rolls-Royce 40/50 hp "Silver Ghost" (1913, # 2442), Phantom II Cabriolet de Ville ("Transformable", 1930, #68GN), Silver Wraith Sedanca (1947, #WTA45)
- Salmson S4, Randonnée
- Sizaire Frères 12CV
- Talbot Lago T26, T150, "Grand Sport"
- Voisin C1, C3L, C14,

== Literature ==
- Peter M. Larsen, Ben Erickson: Jacques Saoutchik, Maître Carrossier. 3 Bände, Dalton-Watson Fine Books, London 2014, ISBN 978-1-85443-269-8

Vol. I: The Life of a Jeweler in Steel.
Vol. II: The Language of Design.
Vol. III: Heavenly Bodies.

- Nick Georgano: The Beaulieu Encyclopedia of the Automobile: Coachbuilding. Fitzroy Dearborn Publishers, Chicago u. a. 2001, ISBN 1-57958-367-9
- Serge Bellu: La Carrosserie Française: du Style au Design. Verlag E-T-A-I, 2007, ISBN 978-2-7268-8716-5
- Serge Bellu: La carrosserie: Une histoire de style. Editions de la Martinière, 2010, ISBN 978-2-7324-4128-3
- Lawrence Dalton: Those Elegant Rolls Royce. Dalton-Watson, London 1978, OCLC 1649.
- Lawrence Dalton: Rolls Royce - The Elegance Continues. Dalton-Watson, London, ISBN 0-901564-05-2
- Jonathan Wood: Coachbuilding - The hand-crafted car body. Shire Publications, 2008, ISBN 978-0-7478-0688-2
