= Bucciali =

French automobile

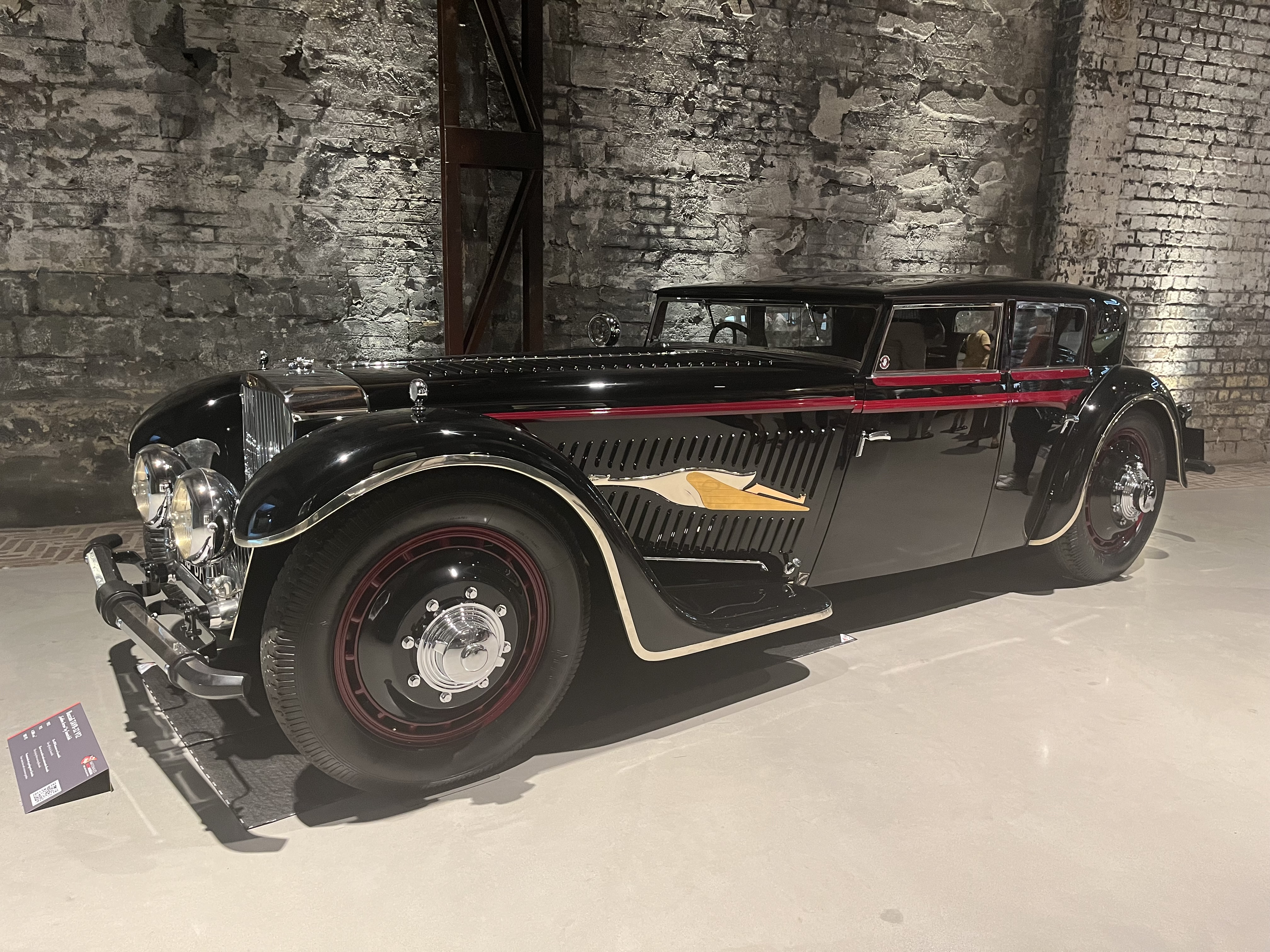
Bucciali TAV8-32 "Fleche d'Or"

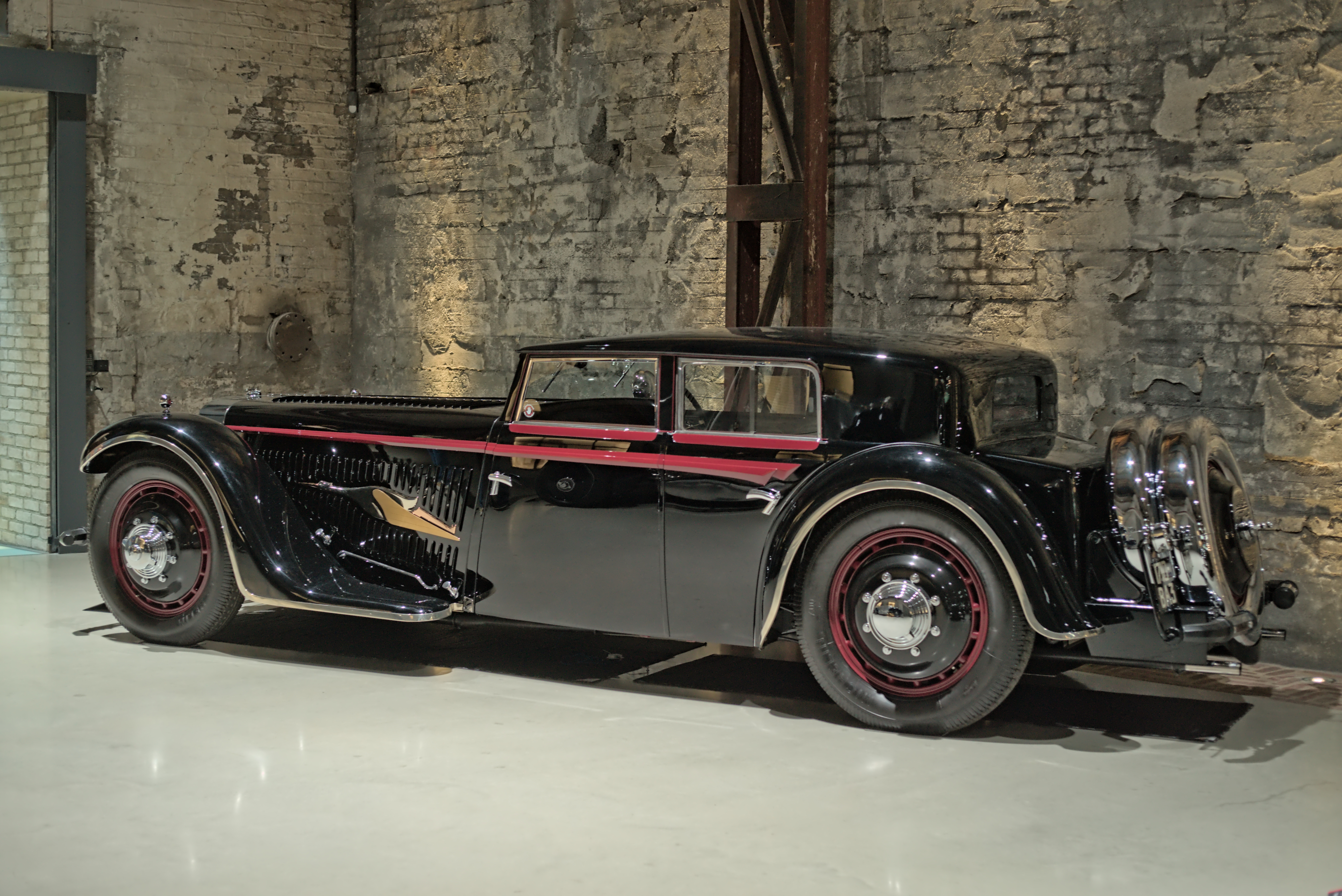
Side view of Saoutchik's design

The Bucciali was a French automobile manufactured from 1922 until 1933.

Built by the brothers Angelo and Paul-Albert Bucciali, the company's first vehicle, produced at Courbevoie, was a cyclecar, sold under the name Buc. Initial offerings were powered by 1,340 cc two-cylinder two-stroke engines. In 1925, a 1,600 cc S.C.A.P.-engined model appeared, available in two versions: the "Tourisme" and the supercharged "Quatre Speciale". A six-cylinder variant of 1,500 cc displacement was also offered.

In October 1928, the Bucciali TAV-6 proved a sensation at the 22nd Paris Motor Show. Six years before the appearance of the Citroën Traction and more than two years before the launch of the DKW F1, the Bucciali TAV-6 featured front-wheel drive (FWD). Another innovative concept, which would only become familiar to most auto industry observers several decades later, was provided by the Sensaud de Lavaud infinitely variable automatic transmission. The car was exhibited on the Bucciali show stand in bare chassis form, enabling visitors to study the front-wheel drive powertrain with its enormous transversely mounted transmission, as well as the all-round independent suspension. Almost as eye-catching in their own terms were the wheels, which were elaborately sculpted from Alpax castings. (Note: Alpax was a Eutectic aluminium-silicon alloy used by several of the more innovative French auto-makers, but little-known outside France.) The car at the show sat on a 3,470 mm (136.6 in) wheelbase and was powered by a Continental side-valve 2.4-litre engine. Later versions of the car would be offered with 6- or 8-cylinder engines.

In the 1930s, the company produced the Double Huit, also a front-wheel drive model, which was powered by a pair of Continental straight-eight engines mounted side by side. The last of the prototypes took a Voisin 12-cylinder engine. Very few of the front-wheel-drive Buccialis ever reached the road.

While it is not known exactly how many of the TAV 12 models were produced, only three are known by automotive enthusiasts to still exist: one in the US, one in France, and one in Canada. The one in the photos is on display at the Nationales Auto Museum in Germany.

The black Bucciali that still exists was rebuilt by Bruce Kelly with the help of Robert LeMire at Lake Country Classics in Saint Paul Minnesota.
