= Bucciali TAV 12 =

Last car model from Bucciali

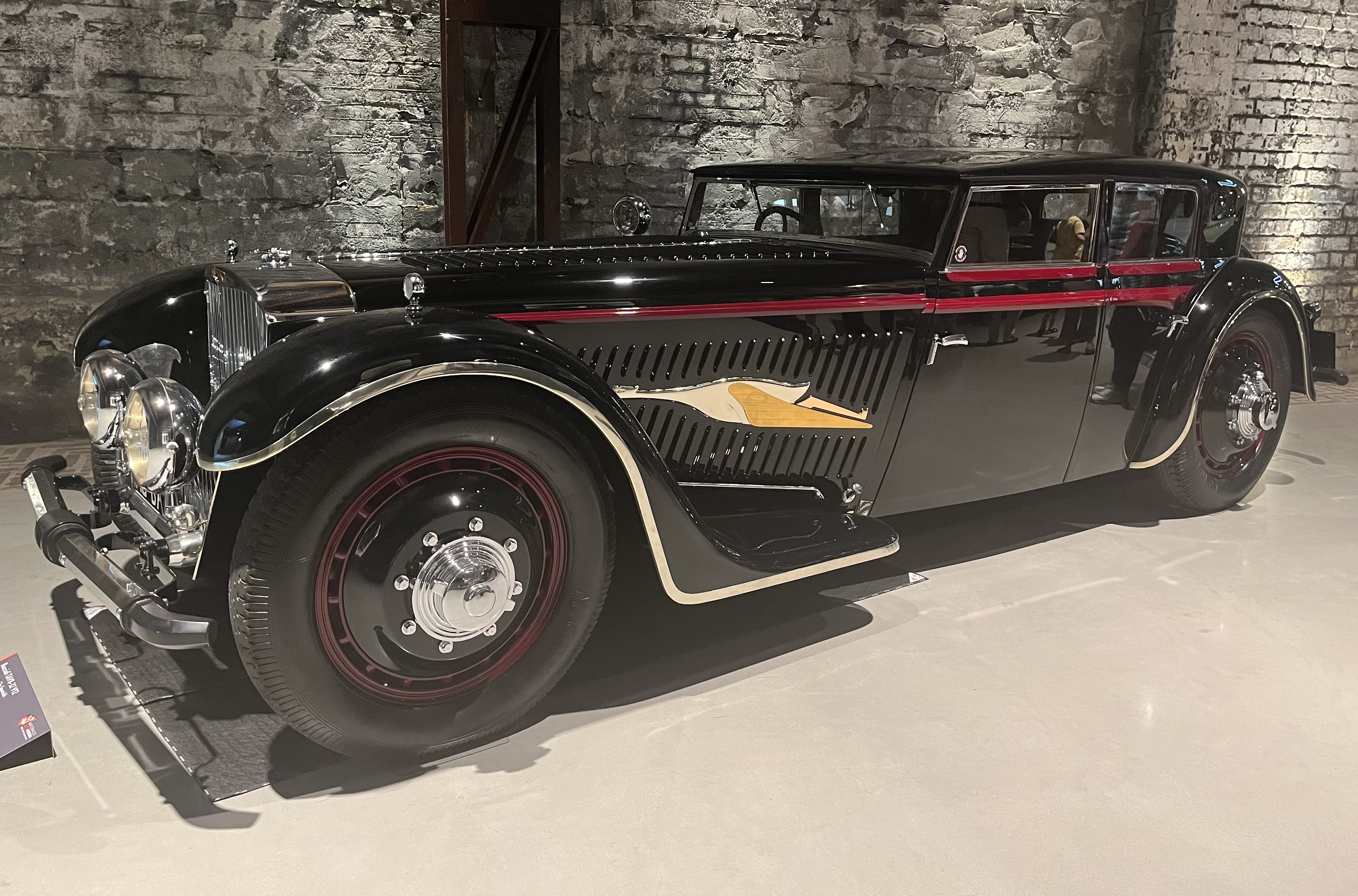
- Bucciali TAV 12 "la flèche d’or"

Overview
- Model code: TAV 12
- Also called: Bucciali TAV 8-32
- Production: 1931 – 1932

Body and chassis
- Class: Luxury car
- Body style: 2-door convertible (before being rebodied); 4-door sedan
- Layout: Front-mid-engine, front-wheel-drive layout

Powertrain
- Engine: 4.9 liter V12 (88 or 132 kW)

Dimensions
- Wheelbase: 3,734–4,089 mm (147.0–161.0 in)
- Length: 6,360 mm (250.4 in)
- Height: 1,480 mm (58.3 in)

The Bucciali TAV 12 (alternatively also 8-32 or Type 7) is the last model from the French car manufacturer Bucciali. Introduced in 1931, the TAV 12's history and characteristics are not fully understood. Unusual for the time, it had front-wheel drive and sensational bodywork, the flat and long limousine version of which was also known as la flèche d'or ("the golden arrow"). The vehicle, of which only one is known, was dismantled into its individual parts before the outbreak of the Second World War. A collector had it rebuilt 40 years later. Since the early 1990s, the TAV 12 has been ready to drive again and is shown at exhibitions from time to time.

== Background ==
The Bucciali brand can be traced back to Angelo ("Buc"; 1889–1981) and Paul-Albert Bucciali (1887–1946). The Bucciali brothers, from a Corsican family, were born in Boulogne-sur-Mer in northern France and worked as piano and organ builders in their hometown. After World War I, they founded Société Bucciali Frères, based in Courbevoie near Paris, which produced a series of small, conventionally styled sports cars from 1922. Some of the cars initially marketed under the Buc badge were one-offs, but some models were produced in small series of up to 100 units (Buc AB 4–5). Occasionally, Buc cars appeared at French motorsport events. Depending on the source, the company produced 120, 150 or 200 cars in 1926. This was not enough to make the business economically viable. As a result, the Bucciali brothers stopped producing conventionally designed automobiles at the end of 1925.

Beginning in 1926, Société Bucciali Frères became an automotive engineering design firm. The Bucciali brothers were now primarily involved in the development of front-wheel-drive designs. This was a new drive concept for automobiles that had attracted some attention since 1925 when a front-wheel-drive racing car (Miller 122) designed by the American engineer Harry Miller had been surprisingly successful in the "Indianapolis 500". The Buccialis often used the preliminary work of other engineers in their designs. The first front-wheel-drive car, the Bucciali TAV 1, incorporated ideas from Brazilian engineer Robert Dimitri Sensaud de Lavaud, while later developments resembled the technology of the 1929 US Cord L-29, the first mass-produced front-wheel-drive passenger car.

Beginning in 1926, the company, now explicitly known as Bucciali, presented a new design at each of the annual Paris Motor Shows held in October, most of which were an evolution of previous concepts. In some cases, only the vehicle frames were exhibited, but in most cases, the chassis was fitted with individual coachworks designed by Angelo Bucciali. They were mostly characterized by unusual proportions, including an unusual length and an extremely low overall height. This design became a trademark of Bucciali. Bucciali's vehicles were usually equipped with internal combustion engines from other manufacturers such as S.C.A.P., Continental, or Lycoming; only in the case of the 1930 Bucciali Double Huit did the company announce a 16-cylinder engine of its design, but this was never realized. Most Bucciali models remained one-offs; only three or four examples of the Bucciali TAV 30 are known to have been built. The company's last model was the 1931 TAV 12, which was fitted with two bodies in succession.

Although the Bucciali brothers regularly announced their intention to mass-produce their front-wheel-drive models, the seriousness of this intention is doubted in the literature, given the extremely low production volume. Most publications assume that the Bucciali brothers were primarily interested in selling their patented front-wheel-drive solutions to interested production car manufacturers; the Buccialis' sensational but impractical car bodies should also be seen in this context. Bucciali sold the rights to use some of his ideas to the Peerless Motor Company, but the company went bankrupt in 1931 and turned into a brewery before it could implement Bucciali's concepts.

== Nomenclature ==
As is often the case with Bucciali models, the name of the vehicle is confusing. Several different designations were used over the years. At the factory, the car was initially called the Bucciali 8-32, with the first digit representing the originally intended eight-cylinder engine and the last two digits indicating the year 1932, when it was to be presented to the public. However, this designation became obsolete when the customer opted for a V12 engine. Automobile historians then introduced the designation TAV 12. TAV stood for Traction Avant (= front-wheel drive), while the 12 denoted the tax class or the number of cylinders, depending on the source. Alternatively, the TAV 12 is also known as Type 7, Bucciali's seventh model.

== History of the TAV 12 ==
=== Production in response to changing customer requirements ===
The TAV 12 was the last of the Bucciali brothers' seven front-wheel-drive cars, and the only one that was not built primarily for show, but for a client. The client was Georges Roure, a businessman who had seen the front-wheel-drive Bucciali Double Huit (Double Eight) with a 16-cylinder engine at the 1930 Paris Motor Show. During production, the car underwent numerous conceptual changes. Roure's original order was for a replica of a 1930 convertible with a V16 engine. However, the Bucciali brothers were unable to deliver a working V16 engine at short notice, as such a design did not exist: The V16 engine block on display at the 1930 show was merely a prototype, with no internal workings. Roure initially ordered an American 8-cylinder engine from Continental instead but changed his order a second time before installation and finally had a 12-cylinder engine from French manufacturer Aéroplanes G. Voisin installed. The first version, introduced in the fall of 1931, was a two-door convertible. Unlike some earlier Bucciali designs, the convertible was unquestionably road-worthy. There are reports of a promotional drive by Paul-Albert Bucciali in November 1931, when Bucciali took the car to Nice, where it participated in an exhibition and was awarded an honorary prize for its sophisticated engineering. Despite this, the customer soon gave up on the convertible as he did not agree with the lines of the body.

In the early months of 1932, Bucciali was commissioned by Roures to produce a large four-door Limousine (French: Berline) nicknamed la flèche d'or. La flèche d'or was completed in April 1932. In the same month, the client Georges Roure took delivery of the car. Bucciali charged 130,000 French francs for the chassis and another 85,600 francs for the body. Roure sold the car shortly thereafter to a Parisian banker.

In October 1932, la flèche d'or was presented to the public at the Paris Motor Show. It was the last time that Bucciali had a stand at this show. Alongside the TAV 12 was a TAV 30 convertible, whose long, low lines followed those of the Berline and which was powered by a Lycoming eight-cylinder in-line engine.

=== Single piece or additional copies? ===
La flèche d'or was probably a single unit; in any case, only one car of this type is in existence today. Although a single source claims that two similar cars with Voisin engines were built in 1932, there is no proof. There is evidence, however, that in the summer or fall of 1932, a two-year-old TAV 30 chassis, initially fitted with a roadster body, was later fitted with a la Flèche d'or-style body for a customer. However, this car was equipped with an eight-cylinder Lycoming engine. Finally, there is evidence that the Bucciali brothers began designing another limousine for the 1933 Paris Motor Show in the fall of 1932, but it was never realized, as Bucciali's development work came to an end in early 1933 for financial reasons.

=== Dismantling and reconstruction ===
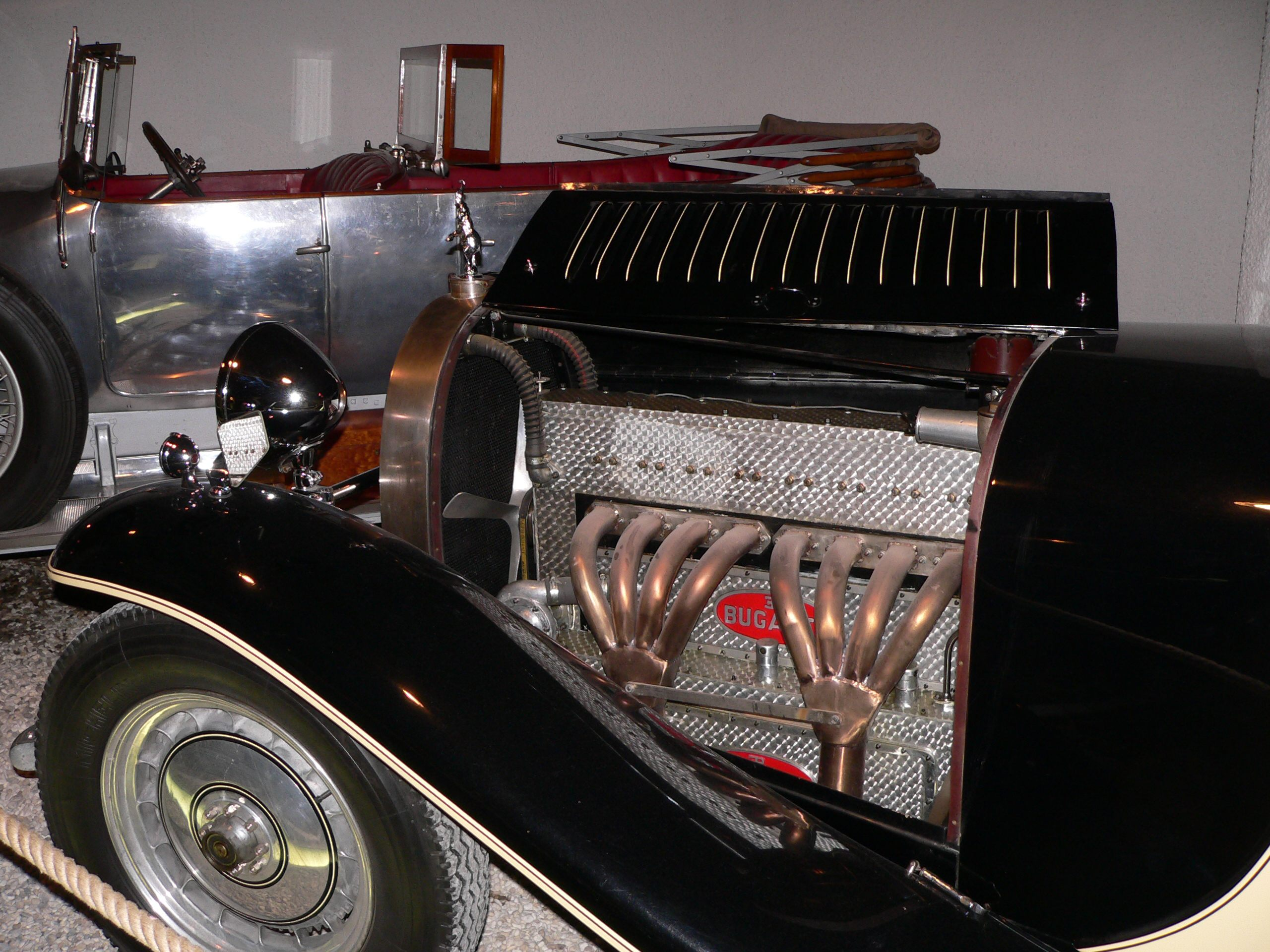
Engine block and chassis details of a Bugatti Type 46

The TAV 12 was used regularly by its owner in the 1930s, but he had the body removed after a few years. The body was mounted on a Bugatti T46 chassis in the late 1930s. Produced from 1929 to 1936, the T 46 was the second largest Bugatti and was known as the "Petite Royale" about the legendary Type 41 luxury limousine. The wheelbase of the Bugatti was half a meter shorter than that of the Bucciali, which meant that the body had to be shortened considerably at the front. The Bugatti with the "la flèche d'or" body was transferred to the US in the early post-war period. The Bucciali chassis remained in France and was considered lost for several years. After its rediscovery, it was purchased by a French collector.

In 1976, the body and the Bucciali chassis came into the hands of an American collector, who had the la flèche d'or rebuilt. The engine, gearbox, front-wheel drive, suspension, and most of the sheet metal parts could be taken over from the original vehicle. Some parts of the chassis, the rear fenders, and the hood were rebuilt from scratch. The reconstruction was completed more than ten years later. Since the late 1990s, the TAV 12 has been on public display several times, including at the Pebble Beach Concours d'Elegance (2006).

== Design and technical details ==
=== Car bodies ===
At first, it was a convertible, but later it was given a four-door limousine body.

==== Convertible ====
The first version, which appeared in the fall of 1931, was a two-door convertible. The car had a steel chassis with a 3734 mm wheelbase, which had already been used for a TAV 30 the previous year. Unlike the other TAV models, the body was not designed by the Bucciali brothers, but by Émile Guillet, the owner of a coachwork factory who was sometimes a partner of Bucciali. It was considered stylistically unsuccessful.

==== Berline: „la flèche d’or“ ====
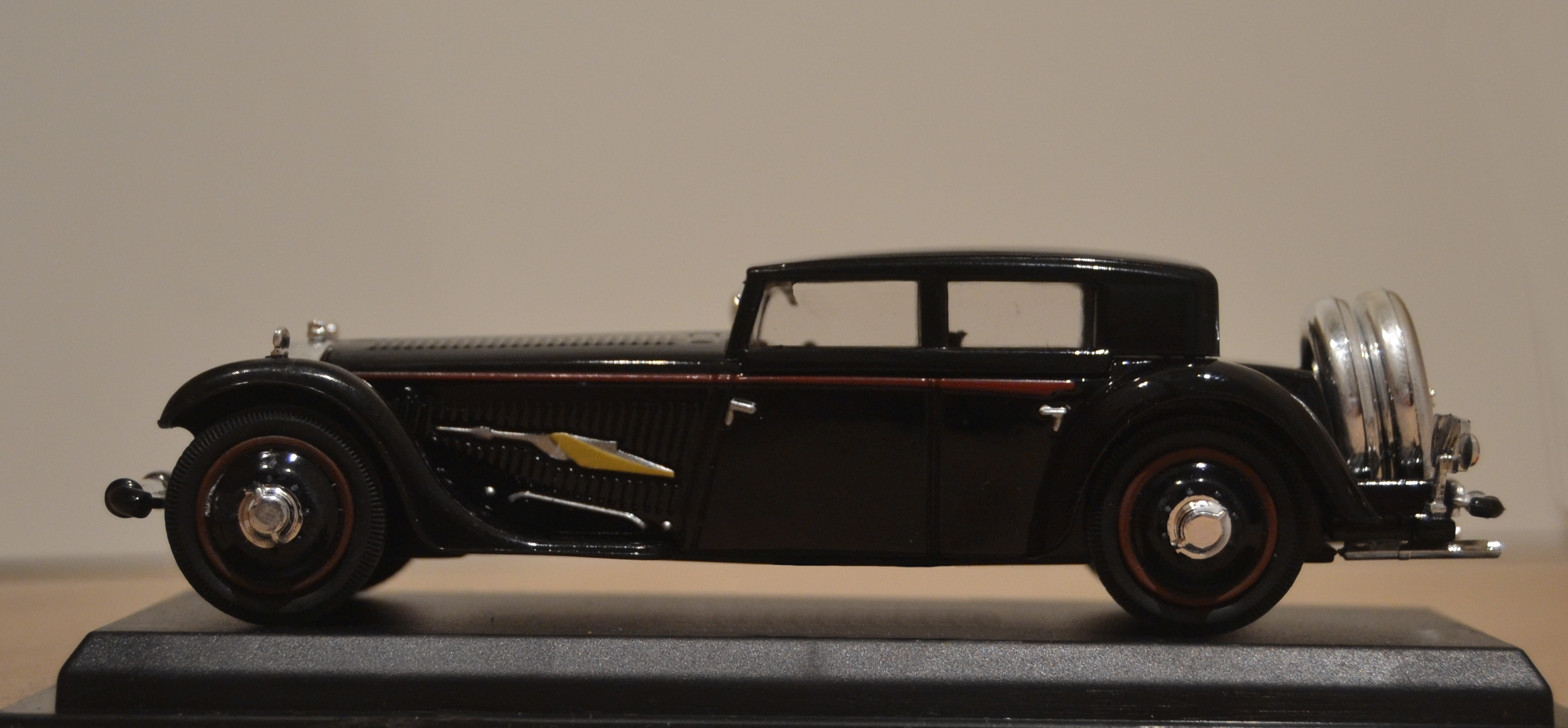
Low hood, large wheels: La flèche d'or (model)

In the early months of 1932, Bucciali produced a large four-door limousine (French: Berline) for Roures, nicknamed la flèche d'or. The body was of mixed construction, consisting of sheet steel shells nailed to a wooden frame.

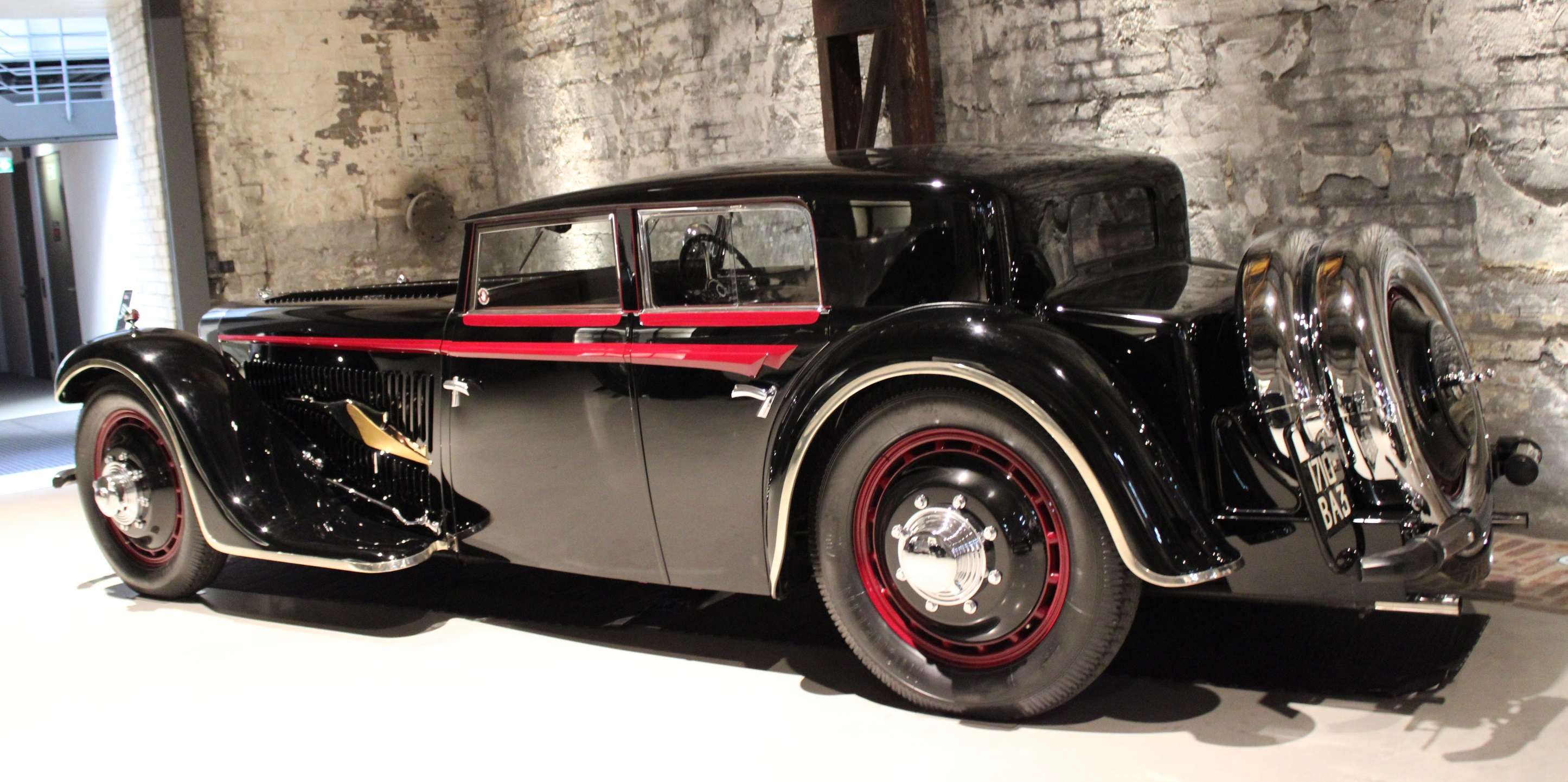
Bucciali TAV 12

The limousine's wheelbase was 4089 mm, only a few millimeters shorter than that of the Bugatti T41 "Royale". With a length of 6360 mm, the car was exceptionally long, while the body height was only 1480 mm. This made the Bucciali TAV 12 Berline the lowest car of its time. The wheels had a diameter of 24 inches. The body was designed by Paul-Albert Bucciali; the sheet metal parts were allegedly made to Bucciali's specifications at Saoutchik in Neuilly-sur-Seine. The hood was also low. Its top line was below the highest point of the fenders so that the hood was partially hidden by the wheels and fenders when viewed from the side. As on the earlier TAV Buccialis models, a stylized stork was mounted on the side vents of the hood. It was a reference to the Escadrille des Cigognes (Stork Squadron) in which Paul-Albert Bucciali had participated during the First World War. The absence of running boards was another stylistic feature. The big headlamps were positioned in front of the grille, directly on the front bumper. Two spare wheels were mounted on top of each other at the rear of the car.

=== Technology ===
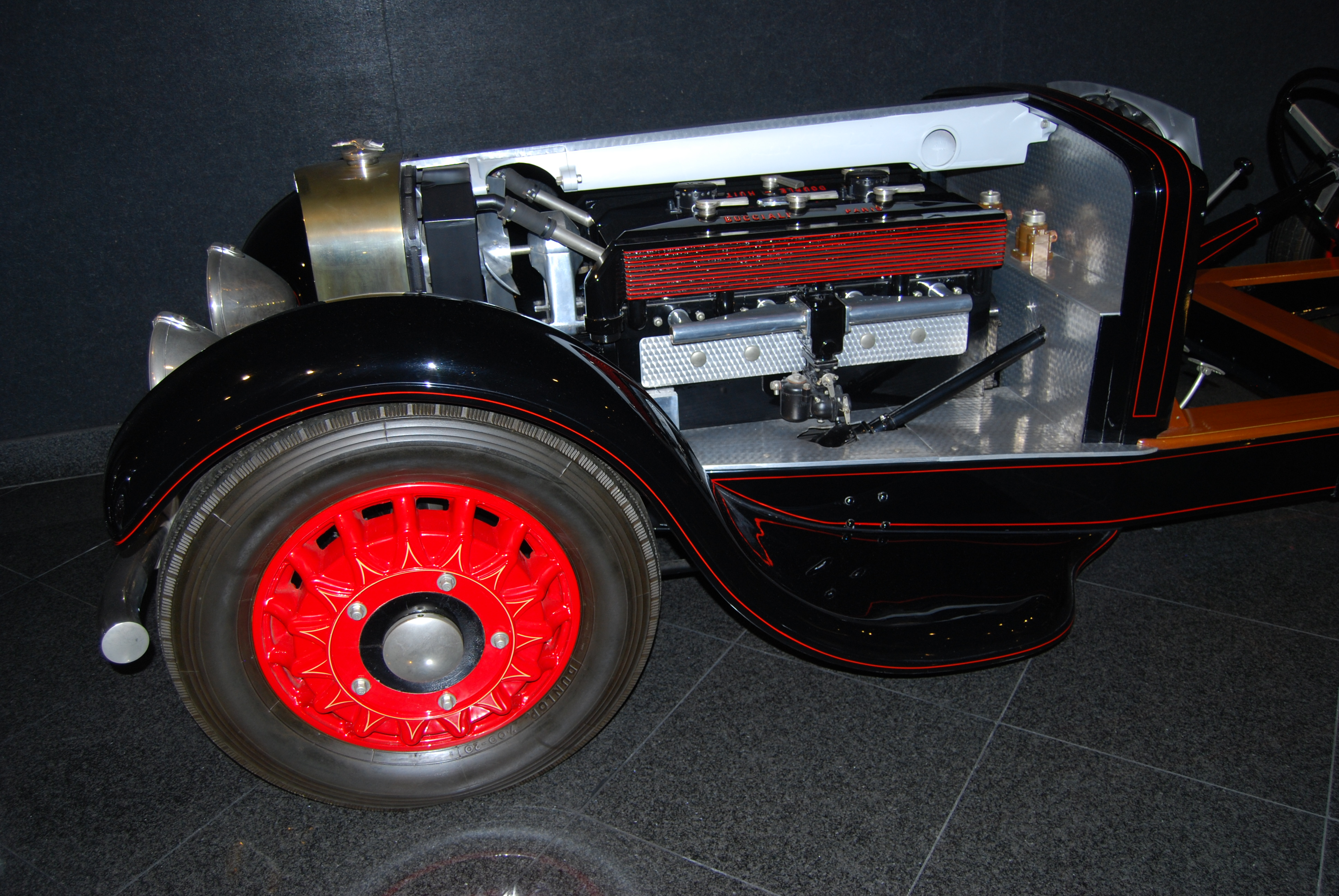
Gearbox in front of the engine block: front-wheel drive chassis of a Bucciali

The TAV 12 had a steel chassis, front-wheel drive and independent front and rear suspension. Paul-Albert Bucciali had already patented this design in 1928. Both versions of the car were powered by a 12-cylinder engine that Bucciali purchased from Voisin. This H18 sleeve valve engine was mainly used in the Voisin C18. It had a displacement of 4886 cc. The mixture was prepared by four Zenith carburetors. The output of the Voisin engine was given as 180 bhp (132 kW), other sources say 120 bhp (88 kW). The Voisin engine, designed for a rear-wheel drive car, was mounted upside down in the Bucciali, so that the flywheel with the clutch was at the front. The four-speed transmission was a Bucciali design. It was positioned transversely in front of the engine, with the differential in front of it. The front drum brakes were internal, i.e. they were located on the differential and acted via the drive shafts.

== Technical data ==
Bucciali TAV 12
Parameter	Convertible	Berline La flèche d’or
Motor:	Twelve-cylinder gasoline engine V-arrangement	
Cubic capacity:	4886 cm³	
Maximum power:	120 hp (88 kW) or 180 hp (132 kW)	
Mixture preparation:	4 Zenith carburetors	
Valves:	none (Knight system slide gate motor)	
Cooling:	Water cooling	
Gearbox:	Four-speed gearbox (manual gearbox) Transverse at the front	
Wheel suspension:	Independent front suspension	
Brakes:	Front and rear drum brakes	
Chassis:	Steel frame	
Coachwork:	Mixed construction (wood frame with steel sheet cladding)	
Wheelbase:	3734 mm	4089 mm
Dimensions (length × width × height):		6360 × ... × 1480 mm
Maximum speed:	180 km/h (112 mph)	

== Bibliography ==
- Gijsbert-Paul Berk: André Lefebvre, and the Cars He Created at Voisin and Citroën, Veloce Publishing Ltd, 2011, ISBN 978-1-84584-464-6
- Griffith Borgeson: Das Märchen vom Storch, Biografie der Frontantriebs-Modelle, in: Motor Klassik, Issues 4 and 5/1989.
- Eric Favre: Bucciali, la passion de la démesure, Brand history Bucciali, in: La Gazoline, Issue of January 26, 2003
- Christian Huet: Bucciali, ed. Christian Huet (Self-published), 2004.
- Serge Bellu: L’Attraction des frères Bucciali. Brand history and presentation of the Bucciali TAV 12, in: Automobiles Classiques No. 116 (September 2001), p. 68 ff.
- H. O. (Hans Otto) Meyer-Spelbrink: Der Flug der Störche. The front-wheel drive models from Bucciali. Oldtimer Markt, issue 4/2016, p. 26
