= Hispano-Suiza J12 =

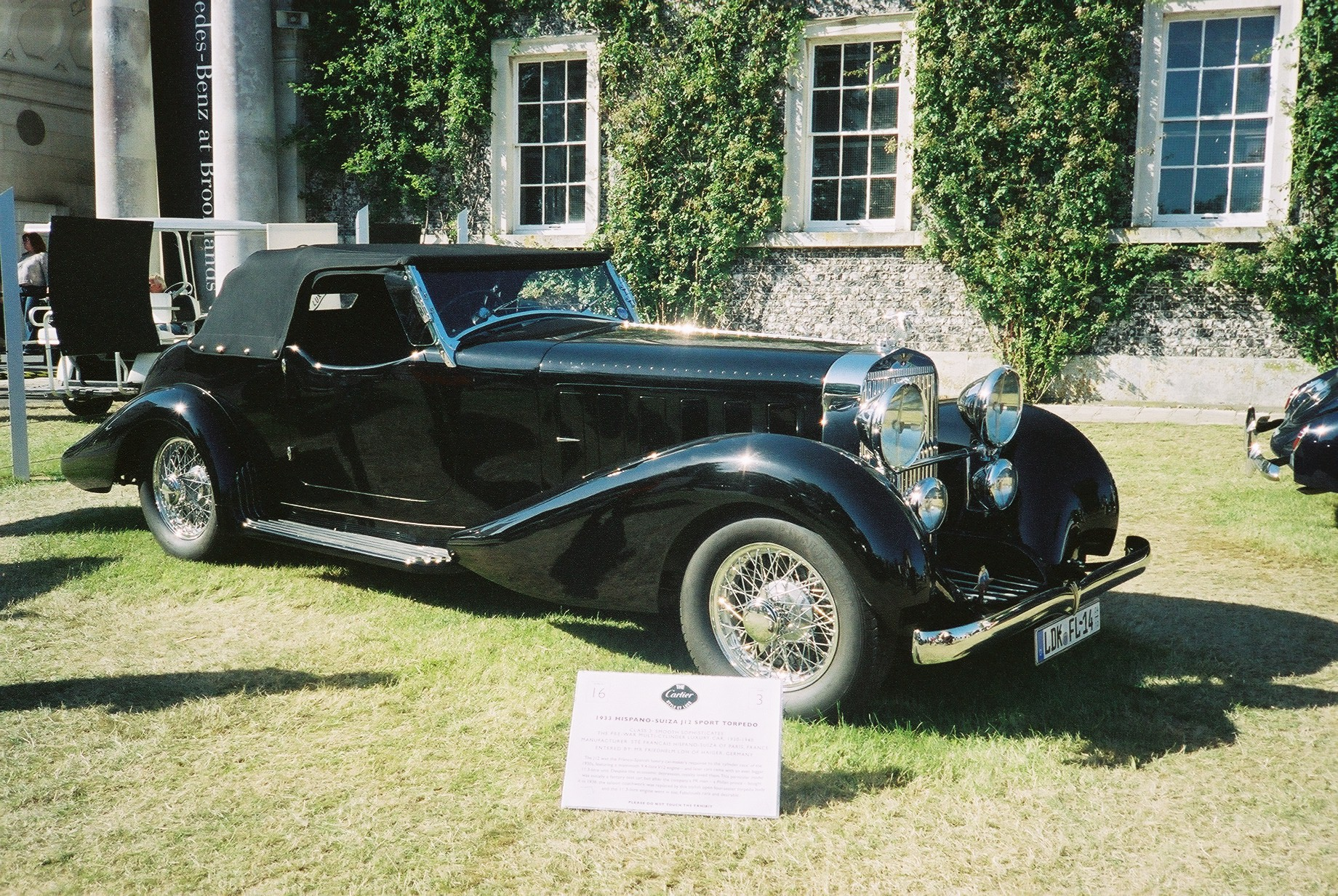
- 1933 Hispano-Suiza J12 Sport Torpedo

Overview
- Manufacturer: Hispano-Suiza
- Also called: T12; Type 68
- Production: 1931–1938
- Assembly: France: Bois-Colombes; (chassis only)
- Designer: Marc Birkigt

Body and chassis
- Class: Ultra-luxury car
- Body style: by arrangement with the customer's coachbuilder
- Layout: Front mid-engine, rear-wheel-drive

Powertrain
- Engine: 9,425 cc (575.1 cu in) OHV V12; (11,310 cc (690.2 cu in) OHV V12 (tipo 68 bis)
- Transmission: 3-speed manual

Dimensions
- Wheelbase: 3,420 mm (134.6 in); 3,710 mm (146.1 in); 3,810 mm (150.0 in); 4,009 mm (157.8 in)

Chronology
- Predecessor: Hispano-Suiza H6

The Hispano-Suiza J12 is a luxury automobile that was made by Hispano-Suiza in France from 1931 to 1938. It was the largest and most expensive car ever built by Hispano-Suiza. It replaced the Hispano-Suiza H6. The J12 was only available as a chassis, buyers having to arrange with an outside coachbuilder to add a body.

Hispano-Suiza suspended automobile production in 1938 to concentrate on the manufacture of aircraft engines.

== Mechanical features ==
The J12 was powered by a 60° V12 engine with pushrod-operated overhead valves and a seven-bearing crankshaft. The pushrod design may have seemed a retrograde step after the overhead cam layout of the preceding H6, but Birkigt's main goal for the J12 was silence and smoothness. The engine initially displaced 9.4 litres (575.1 cu in) with bore and stroke both being 100 mm (3.9 in) and with a compression ratio of 5.0:1, it delivered 220 PS (162 kW; 217 bhp) at 3000 rpm. Each engine block was machined from a single 700 lb (318 kg) billet.

Hispano-Suiza also entered a French competition for engines for railcars; after having tested variants of the H6 they chose to develop a version of the tipo 68 with a 120 mm (4.7 in) stroke. Called the type 68 bis, two existing cars were fitted with this engine, displacing 11.3 litres (690.2 cu in) and delivering 250 PS (184 kW; 247 bhp). The J12s were later regularly available with the larger engine, although the total production of these remained in the single figures.

To demonstrate the high quality engineering and reliability of the J12, one car was driven from Paris to Nice and back without needing oil or water.

== The J12 of the Spanish Head of State ==
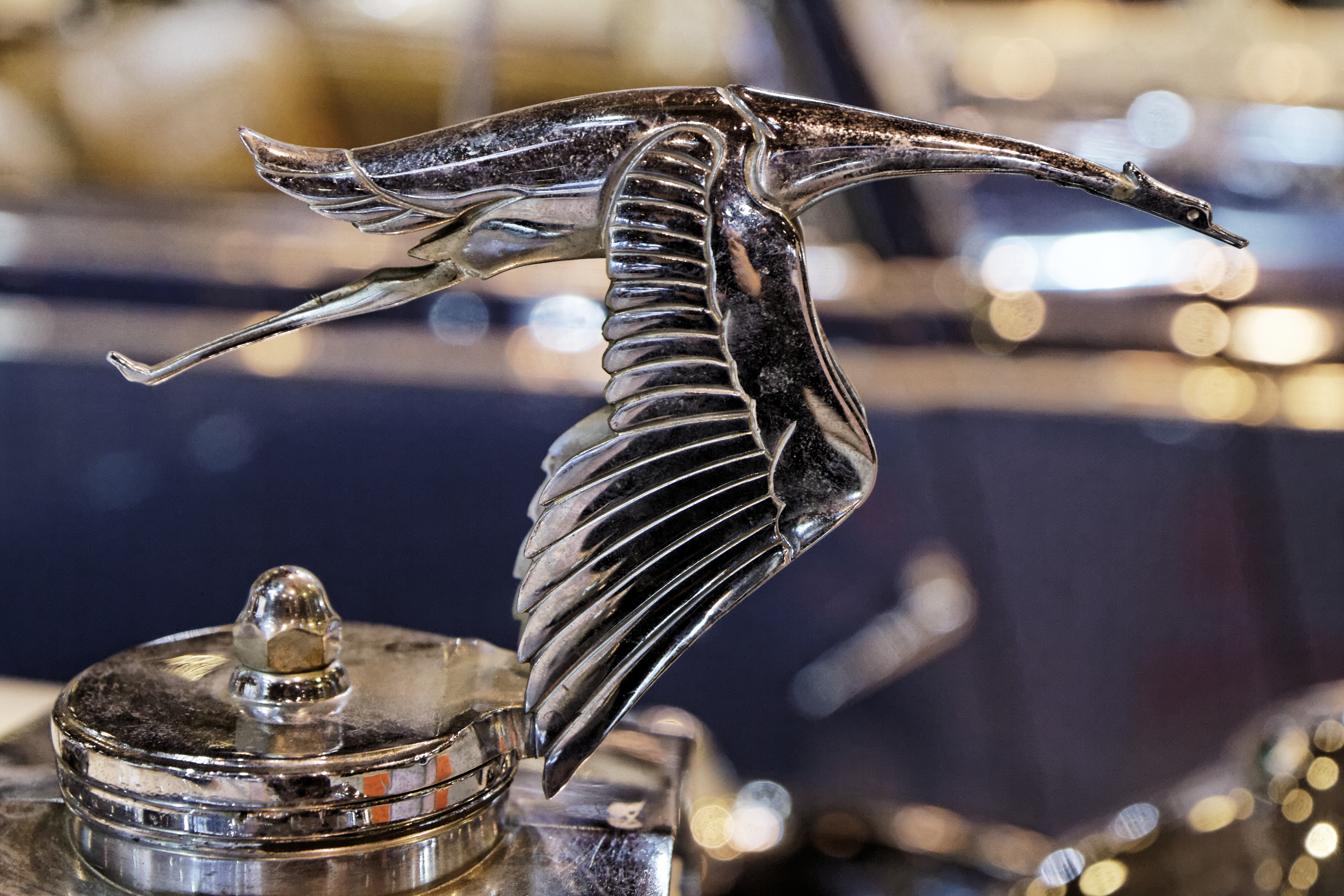
Hispano Suiza J12 "Flying Stork" hood ornament

In 1935 the Spanish Government placed an order for a J12 as ceremonial car for the President of the Republic. The body was to be a four-door convertible, built by Carrosserie Vanvooren of Paris. When the Spanish Civil War broke out in 1936, the bodied car was still in the French Hispano-Suiza plant, and in 1938 Miguel Mateu y Pla, one of the owners of the company, decided to deliver it to the Nationalists side. The car was then sent to the Fichet plant in Marseille to receive its armor plate and eventually delivered to the then new Spanish Government. It was first used by their Head of State, General Franco, in the Victory parade held in Madrid in May 19th, 1939.

In 1952 this J12 was replaced by a Rolls-Royce Phantom IV. This was the only convertible out of the three Mulliner-bodied Phantom IV purchased by the Spanish Government; all of them are still in use in present days at the service of the Spanish royal family.

== The J12 of the Shah Of Iran ==
Mohammad Reza Shah was given a J12 by his father in 1931 at the age of 12, right before taking part in Institut Le Rosey school in Switzerland.

The body was made by Paris-based body maker Carrosserie J. Saoutchik and used Swiss engineer Marc Birkigt's Hispano-Suiza V12 engine.

== Gallery ==
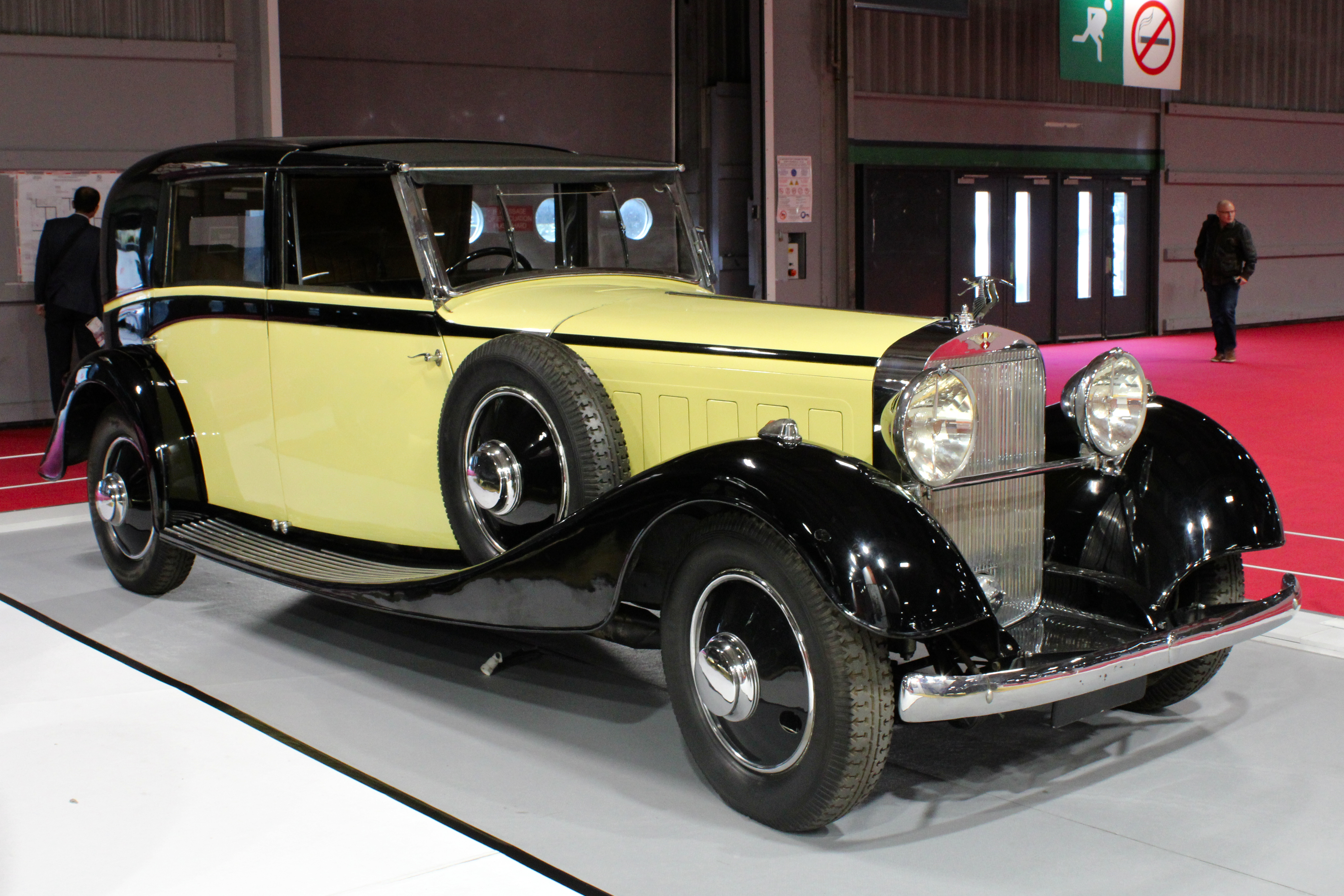
1934 J12 phaeton limousine

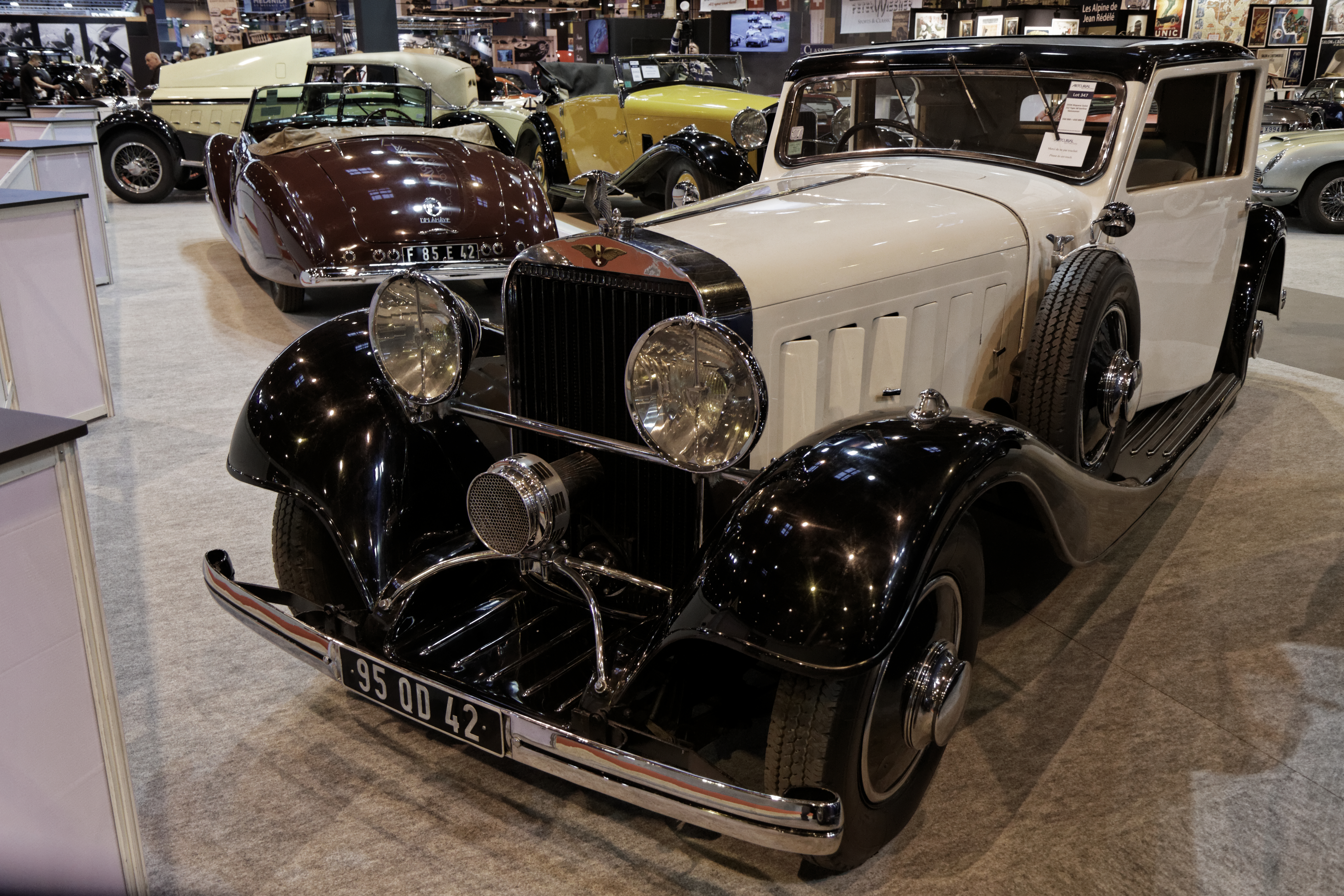
Hispano Suiza J12 Type 68 berline Vanvooren

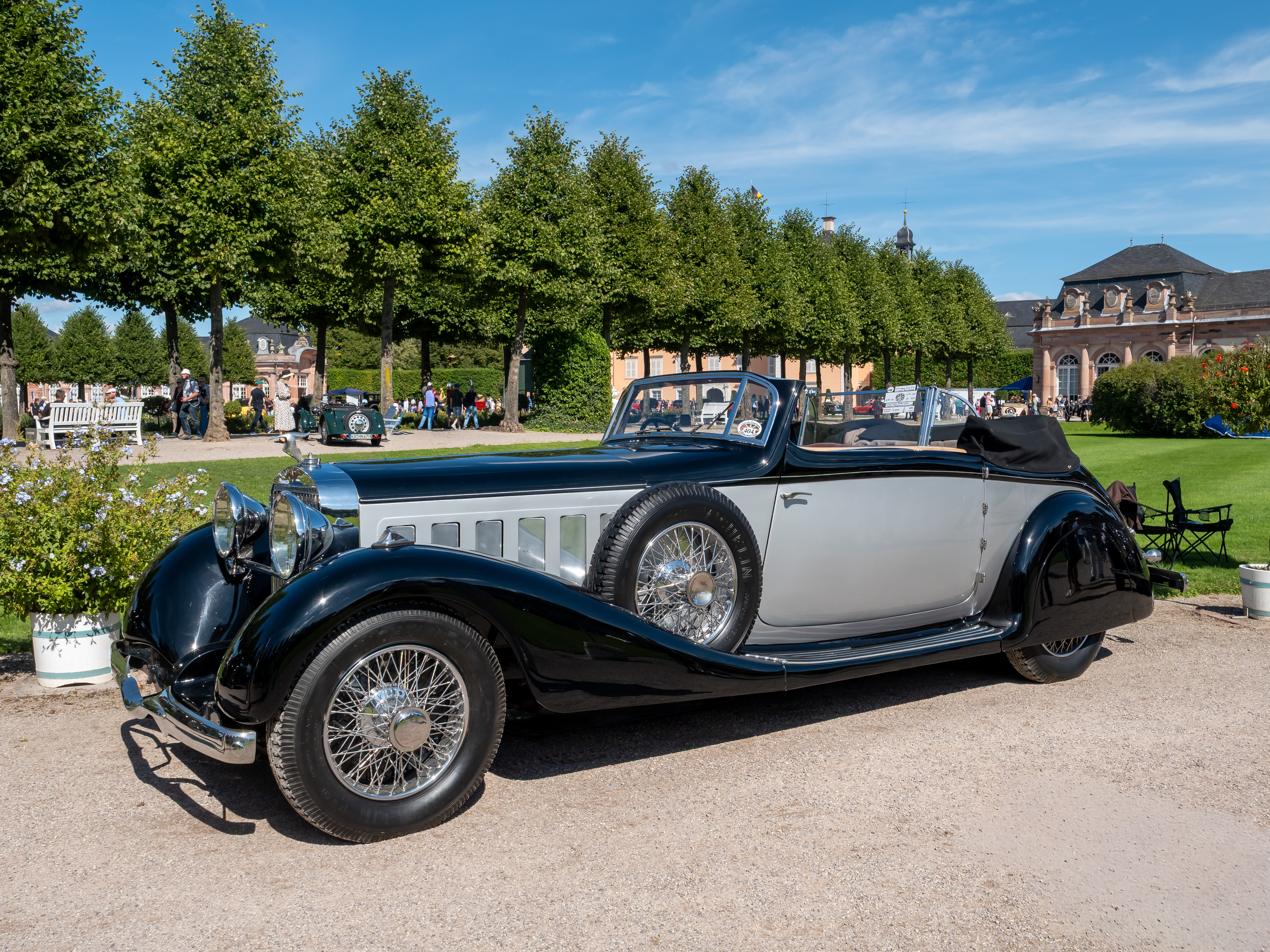
Hispano-Suiza J12 bodied by D'Ieteren

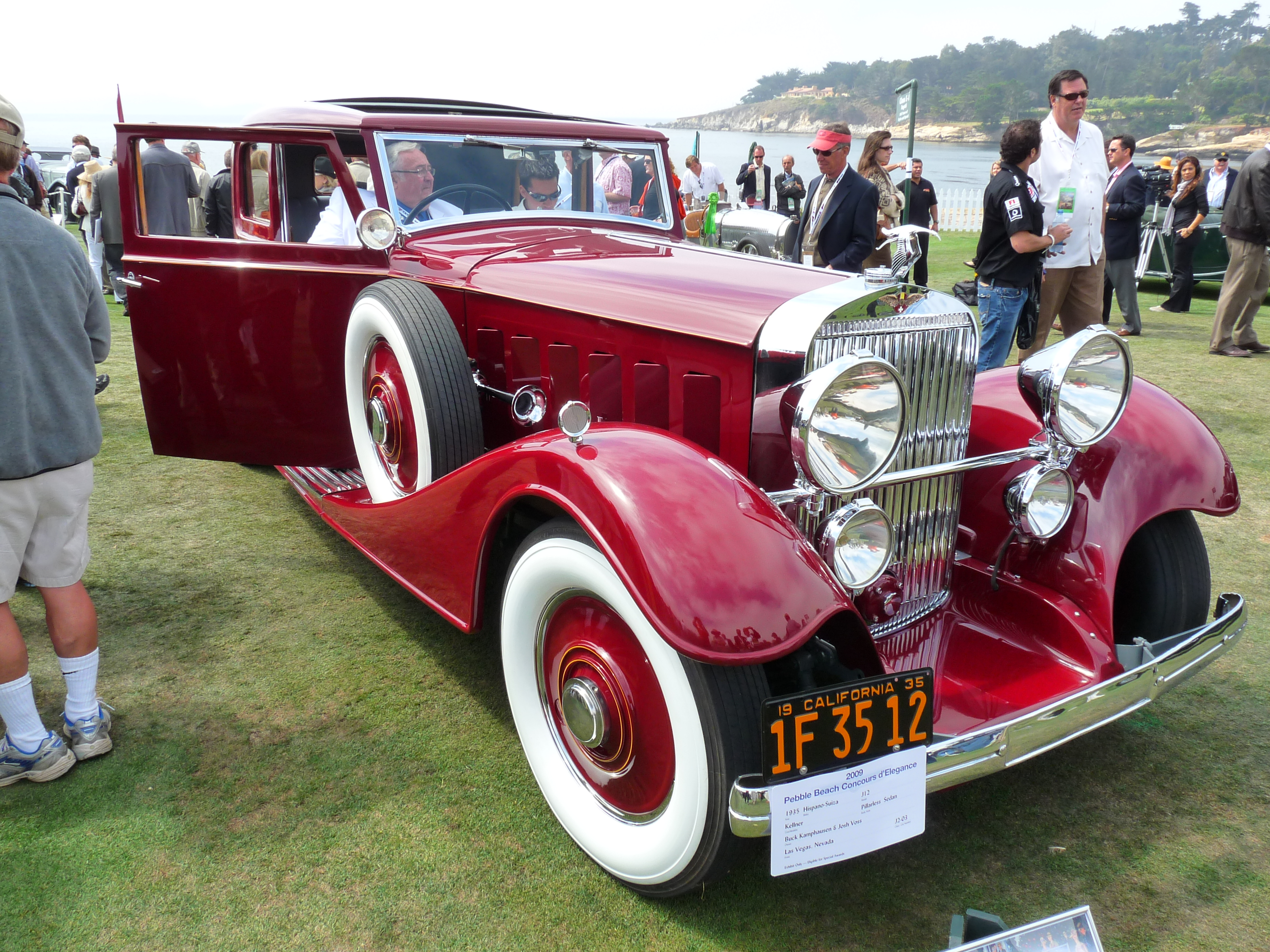
1935 Hispano Suiza J12 Kellner Pillarless Sedan

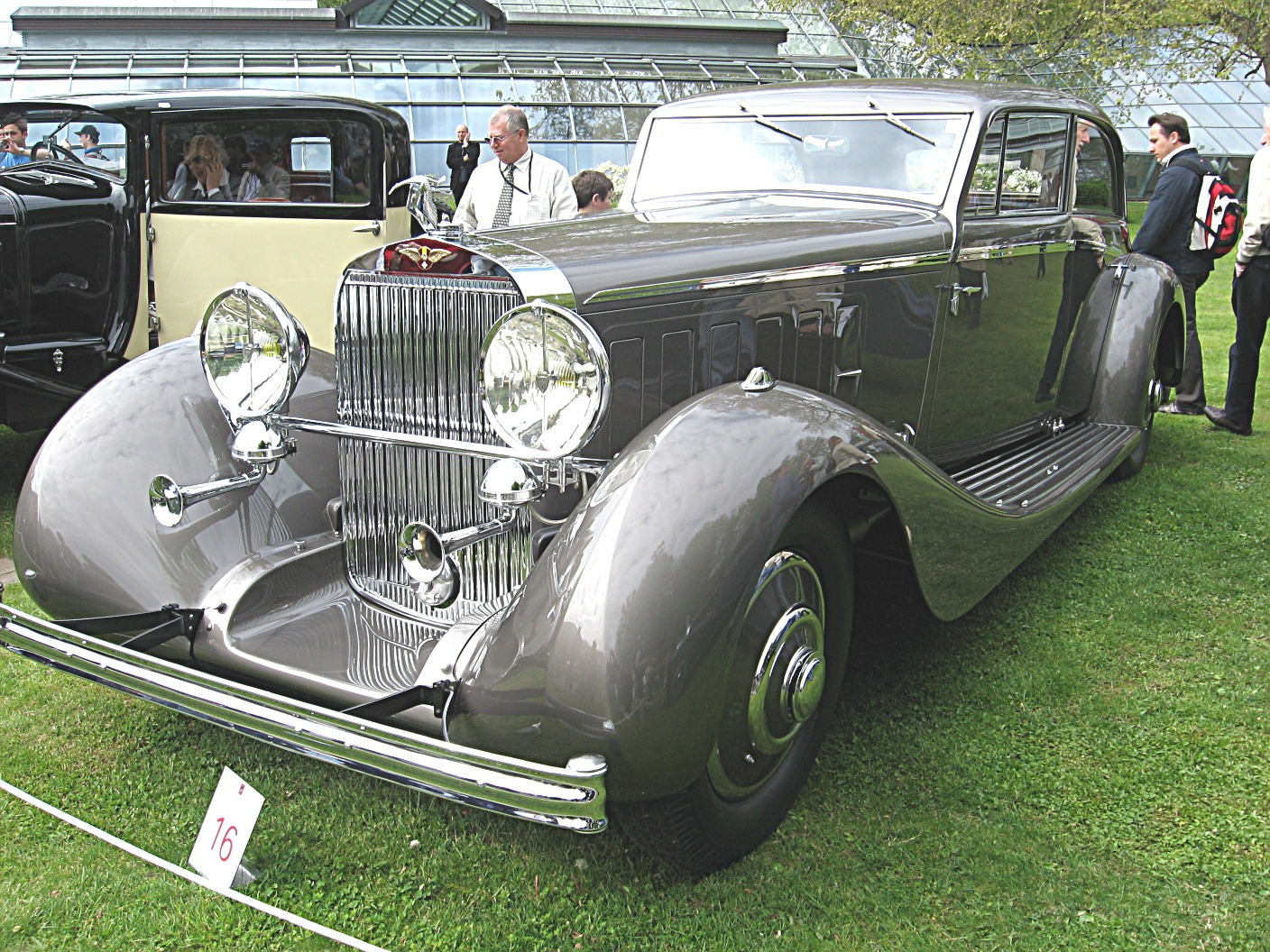
1936 Hispano Suiza J12 by Fernandez & Darrin

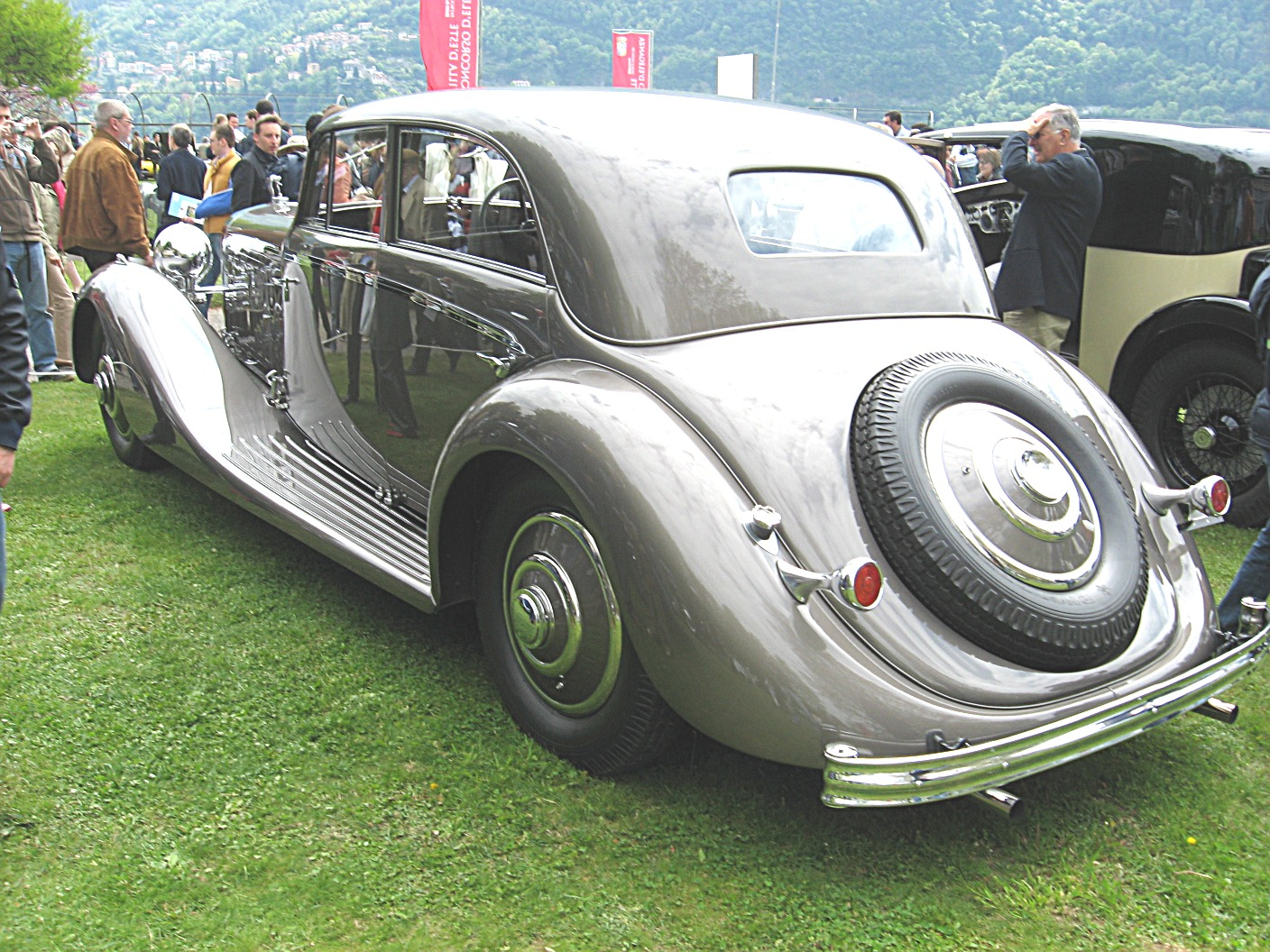
1936 Hispano Suiza J12 by Fernandez & Darrin (back)
