= Hispano-Suiza H6 =

Luxury car built mostly in France

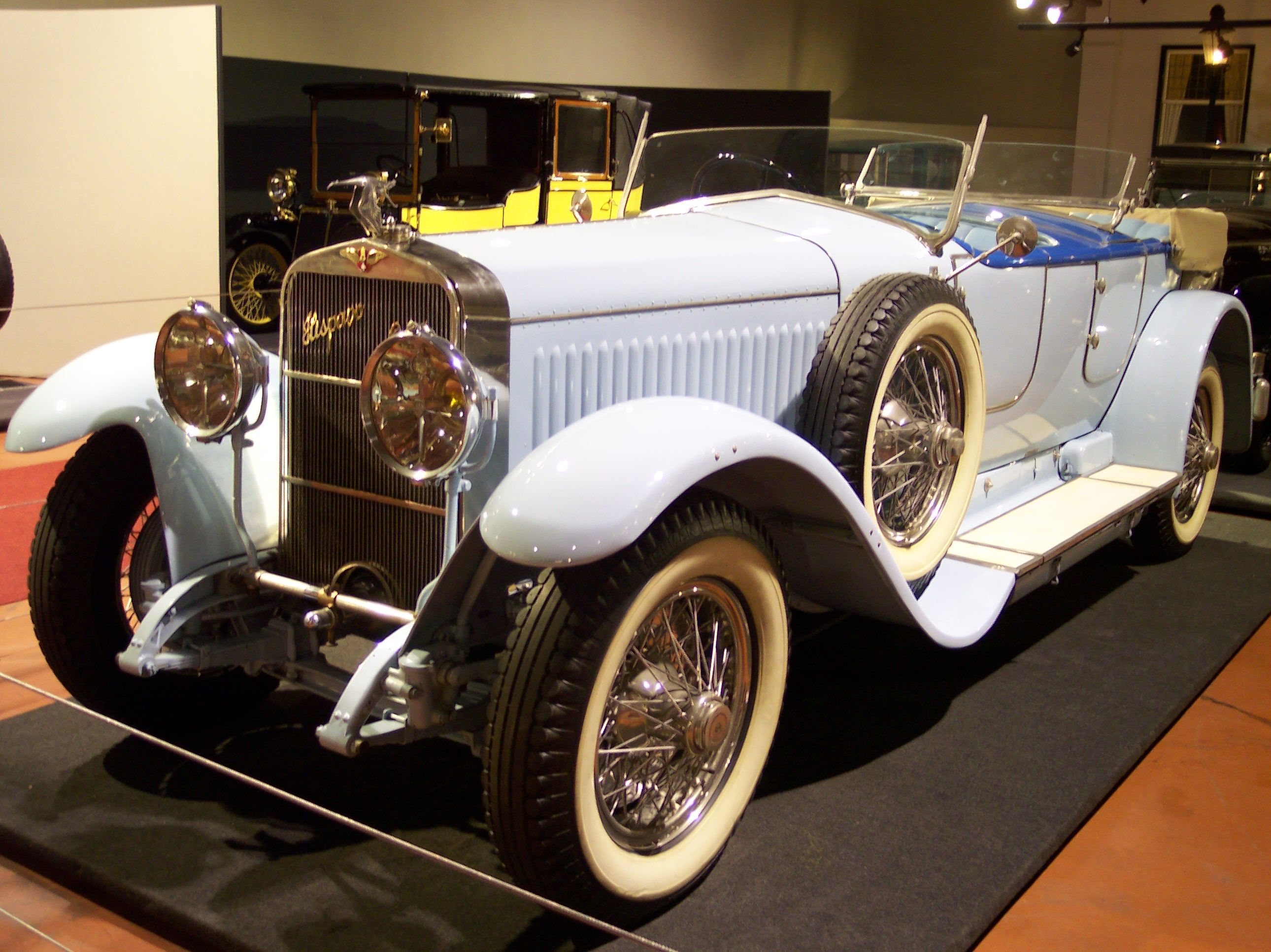
- Hispano-Suiza 1924 H6B Million-Guiet Dual-Cowl Phaeton

Overview
- Manufacturer: Hispano-Suiza
- Production: 1919–1933
- Assembly: France: Paris (Bois-Colombes factory)
- Designer: Marc Birkigt

Body and chassis
- Class: Luxury car
- Layout: FMR layout

Powertrain
- Engine: H6/H6B: 6597 cc OHC I6; H6C: 7983 cc straight-6
- Transmission: 3-speed manual

Dimensions
- Length: 5,537 mm (218.0 in)
- Width: 1,791 mm (70.5 in)
- Curb weight: 1,583 kg (3,490 lb)

Chronology
- Successor: Hispano-Suiza J12

The Hispano-Suiza H6 is a luxury car that was produced by Hispano-Suiza, mostly in France. Introduced at the 1919 Paris Motor Show, the H6 was produced until 1933. Roughly 2,350 H6, H6B, and H6C cars were produced in total.

== Specifications ==
The H6 engine featured a straight-six engine inspired by designer Marc Birkigt's work on aircraft engines. It was an all-aluminium engine displacing 6,597 cubic centimetres (403 cu in). Apart from the new overhead camshaft, it was essentially half of Birkigt's aviation V12 design. The seven-bearing crankshaft was milled from a 600 lb (272 kg) steel billet to become a sturdy 35 lb (16 kg) unit, while the block used screwed-in steel liners, and the water passages were enamelled to prevent corrosion.

One of the most notable features of the H6 was its brakes. They were light-alloy drums on all four wheels with power-assist the first in the industry, driven with a special shaft from the transmission. When the car was decelerating, its own momentum drove the brake servo to provide additional power. This technology was later licensed to other manufacturers, including arch-rival Rolls-Royce.

The 1922 H6B received only minor changes, including upating the original cone clutch to a dry, plate clutch. While Hispano-Suiza did not divulge any power figures for the H6, torque figures reportedly increased marginally for the H6B. An 8.0-litre (488 cu in) (110 by 140 mm [4.3 by 5.5 in]) engine was used in 1924's H6C.

The H6 series was replaced in 1933 by the J12, which initially used a 9.5-litre (580 cu in) V12 pushrod engine.

== Special versions ==
A series of five racing H6Bs with short wheelbases and slightly enlarged engines was built in 1922. These were referred to as "Boulogne", to celebrate the H6's triple victory at the sports car race at Boulogne by pilots Dubonnet, Garnier, and Boyriven in 1923 (Journal des debats, July 27, 1923). Woolf Barnato piloted a Boulogne to eight international records, including a 92 mph (148 km/h) average over 300 mi (480 km), at Brooklands in 1924.

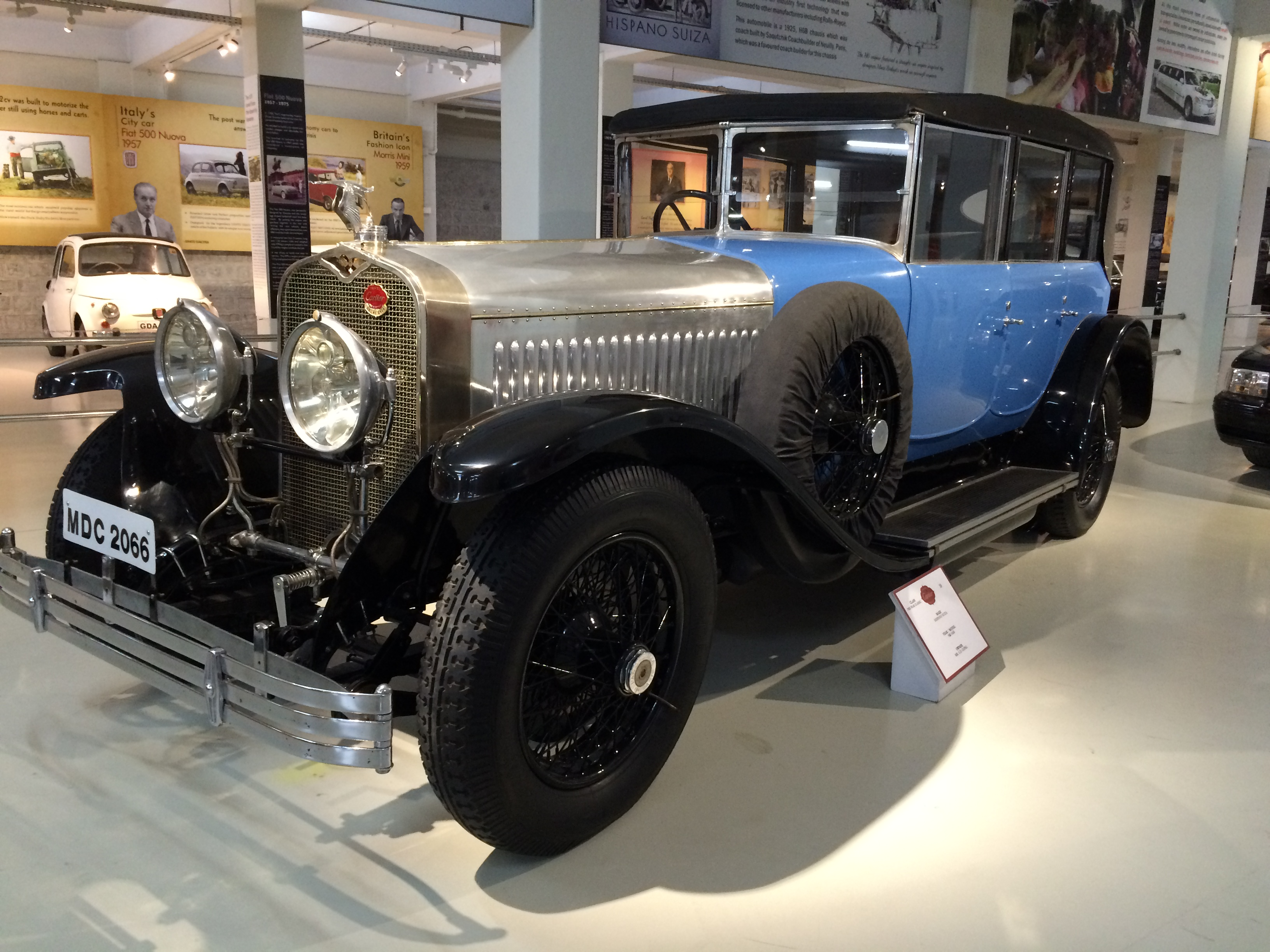
A Hispano-Suiza H6B built for Maharaja of Mysore now in Coimbatore, India

André Dubonnet entered an H6C Boulogne in the 1924 Targa Florio. Powered by a 7,983 cc (487.2 cu in) straight 6 (estimated to produce 195 hp (145 kW)), Dubonnet demanded a maximum body weight of 100 lb (45 kg), and the aircraft maker Nieuport- Astra complied with tulipwood strips (later determined to have been mahogany), fastened to an aluminium frame with thousands of tiny rivets. Dubonnet finished the gruelling event without a body failure, and drove home to Naples afterward. This vehicle is currently housed at the Blackhawk Museum near Danville, California.

A later series of short-wheelbase H6Cs was built, eventually being referred to as "Monzas".

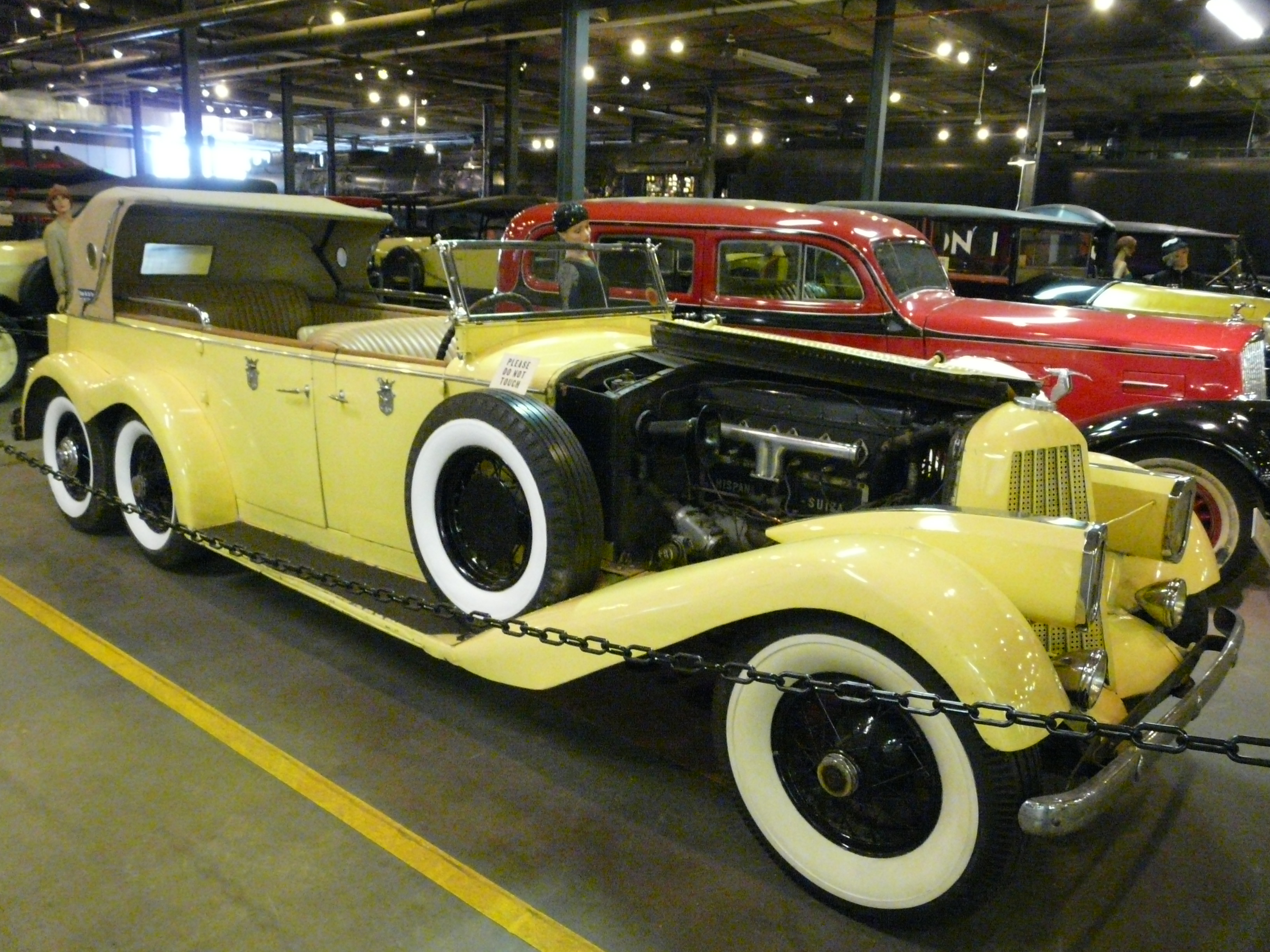
Griffith's six-wheeled H6A

A six-wheeled H6A is on display at the Forney Museum in Denver.

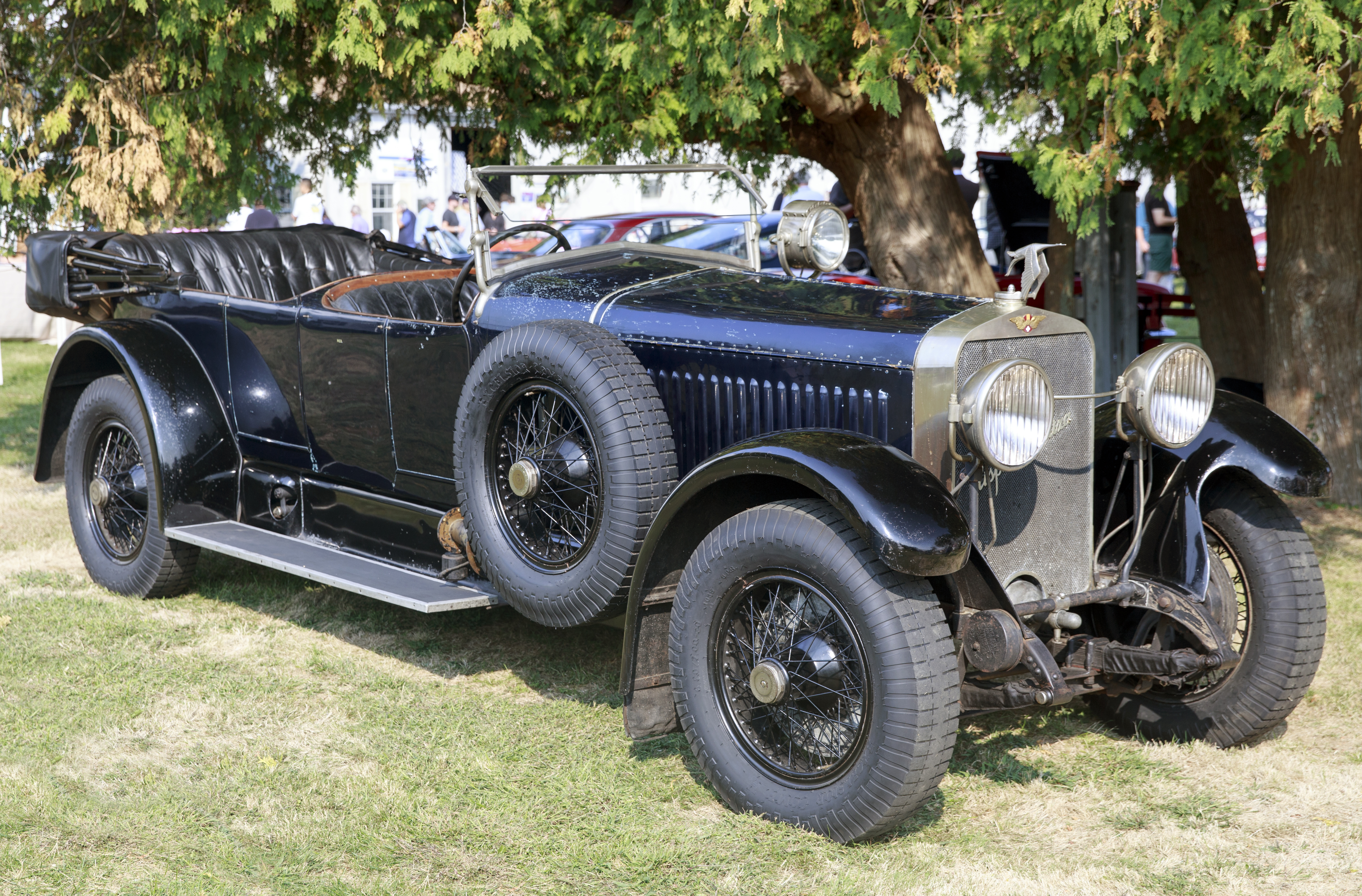
1921 Hispano Suiza H6B Tourer by Marcel Chavet

=== Specifications: 1924 H6C Dubonnet Boulogne Targa Florio speedster ===
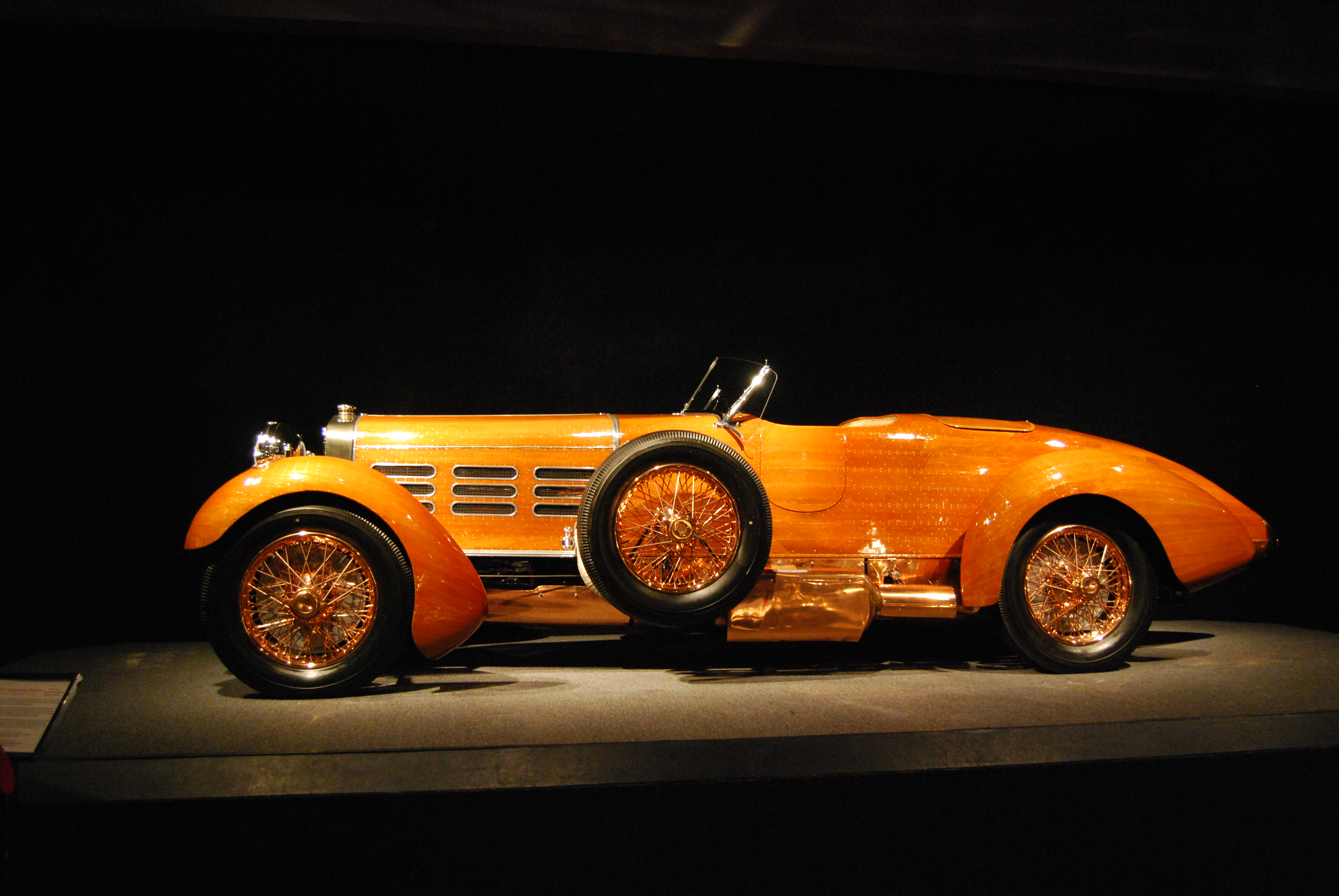
André Dubonnet's 1924 H6C Targa Florio speedster

- Length: 5,537 mm (218.0 in)
- Width: 1,791 mm (70.5 in)
- Height
  - cowl: 1,245 mm (49.0 in)
  - windshield: 1,524 mm (60.0 in)
- Wheelbase: 3,378 mm (133.0 in)
- Wheels: 508 mm (20.0 in) center-locking
- Weight: 1,583 kg (3,490 lb)
- Transmission: three-speed manual
- Suspension:
  - Front: beam
  - Rear: live axle, semi-elliptic leaf spring
- Engine: Hispano-Suiza straight 6
  - Bore: 110 mm (4.3 in)
  - Stroke: 140 mm (5.5 in)
  - Displacement: 7,982 cc (487 cu in)
  - Maximum power: 195 hp (145 kW) at 3000 rpm (estimated)

=== Škoda ===
The earliest H6As and the T49 version were built at Hispano-Suiza's industrial complex at La Sagrera, Barcelona, but most H6s were built at Hispano-Suiza's French division in the Parisian suburb of Bois-Colombes. Some 100 H6s were built under license by Škoda in Czechoslovakia from 1926 to 1929. To cope with the poor fuels available, the compression ratio had been limited to 4.5:1 and engine power to 100 hp (75 kW) at 1800rpm.

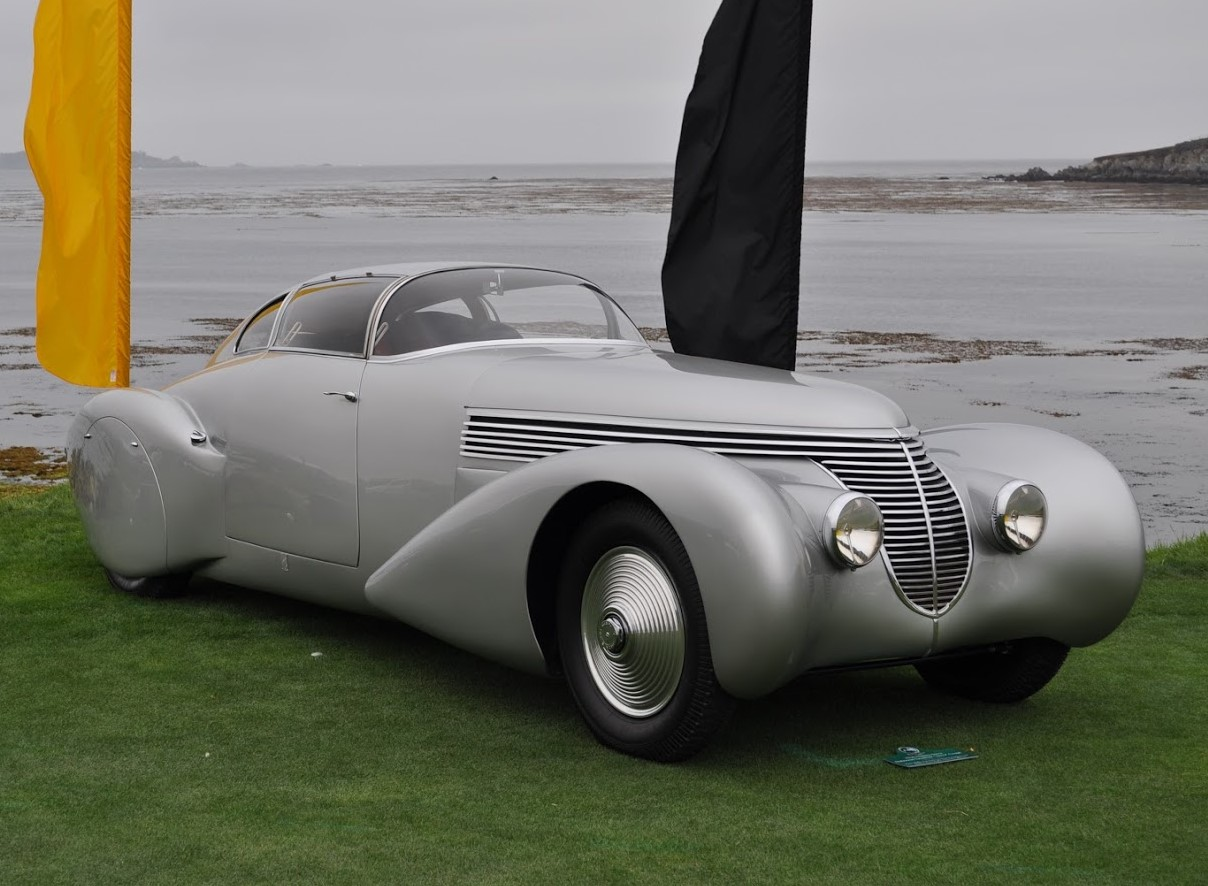
1938 H6B Dubonnet Xenia

=== H6B Dubonnet Xenia ===
In 1938, Hispano-Suiza built a one-off H6B for André Dubonnet, in which he installed the engine from the H6C, his own custom suspension system, and custom bodywork by coachbuilder Saoutchik. This H6B served as his personal car, as well as a showcase of his automotive technologies and aerodynamic innovations. The H6B Dubonnet Xenia is currently owned by and is on display at the Petersen Automotive Museum in Los Angeles, California.

== In popular culture ==
In Miss Fisher's Murder Mysteries, Australian detective Phryne Fisher drives a red 1923 Hispano-Suiza H6, which makes frequent appearances in the television series.
