= Million-Guiet =

French coachbuilding company

- Industry: Automotive
- Founded: 1854
- Defunct: 1943
- Headquarters: Levallois-Perret, France

Million-Guiet was a French coachbuilding company.

== History ==
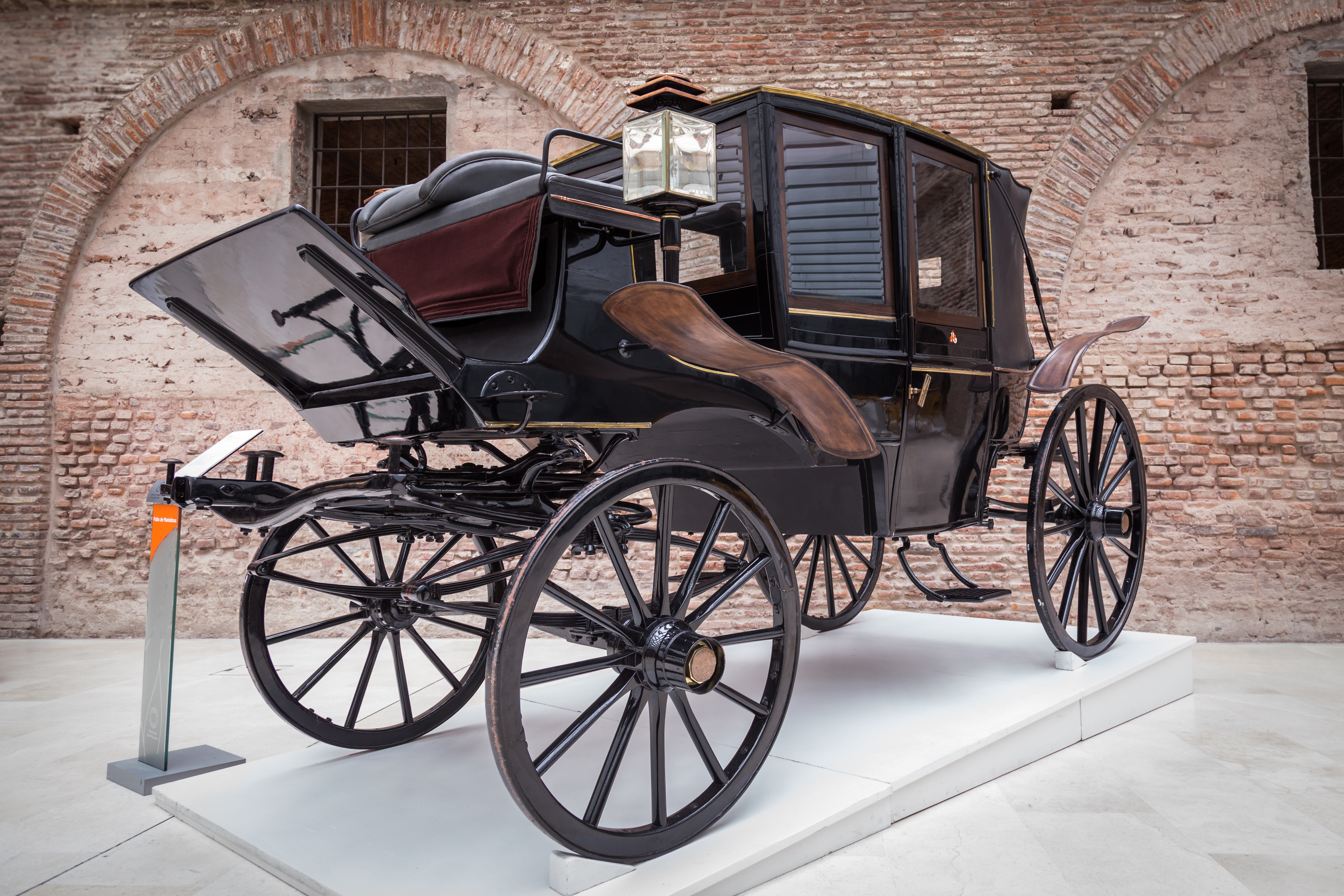
Coach with Million-Guiet coachwork

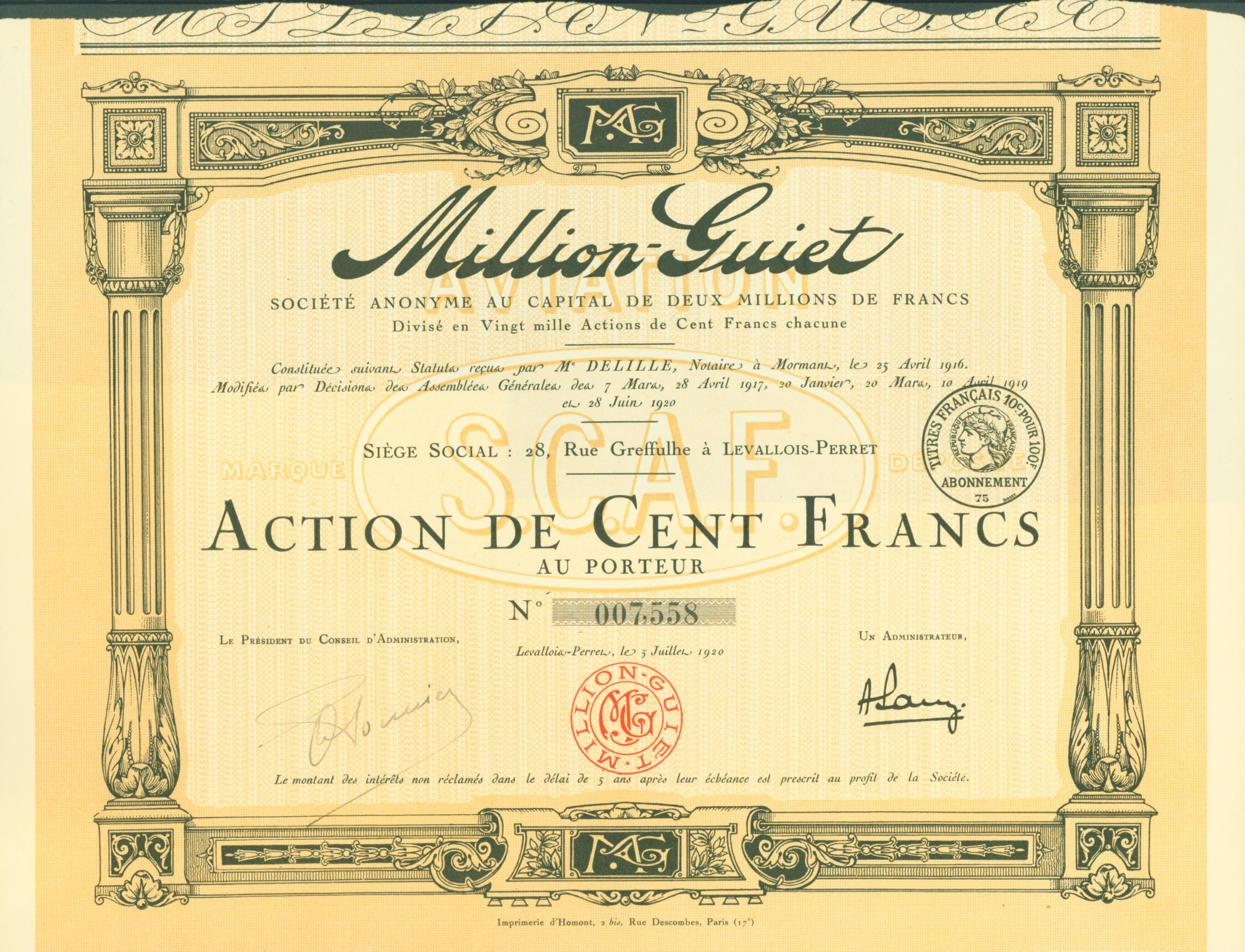
Share of the Million-Guiet S. A., issued 5 July 1920

The company was founded in 1854 to manufacture carriages in Paris. In 1900, the production of car bodies began. At that time, the company was based in Levallois-Perret. Until 1914, the car bodies were described as old-fashioned.

In 1919, a license was acquired from Gustave Baehr. This made the bodies lighter. These included bodies on chassis by Chenard & Walcker, Hispano-Suiza, Panhard & Levassor, Peugeot and Voisin.

In 1928 Luis Sanz and M. Mossier took over the company. In January 1930 they acquired a patent from Jean de Vizcaya for the Toutalu construction method and in turn gave a license to D'Ieteren. They used light metal. They built bodies for Alfa Romeo, Bugatti, Citroën, Delage, Hispano-Suiza, Lorraine-Dietrich, Panhard & Levassor and Talbot as well as for a Cord L-29, Lancia Dilambda and Renault Vivastella. Other well-known cars include Ballot, Bugatti Type 46 and Type 50, Farman, Isotta Fraschini, Lincoln, Minerva, Rochet-Schneider, Rolls-Royce and Turcat-Méry.

Their angular design did not harmonize well with the streamlined design that emerged in the 1930s. In 1936, the production of complete bodies ended.

The company continued to exist manufacturing accessories for some time, until it closed in 1943.

Between 1950 and 1954, Million-Guiet-Tubauto manufactured buses and trolleybuses under the brands MGT and Tubauto.

== Gallery ==
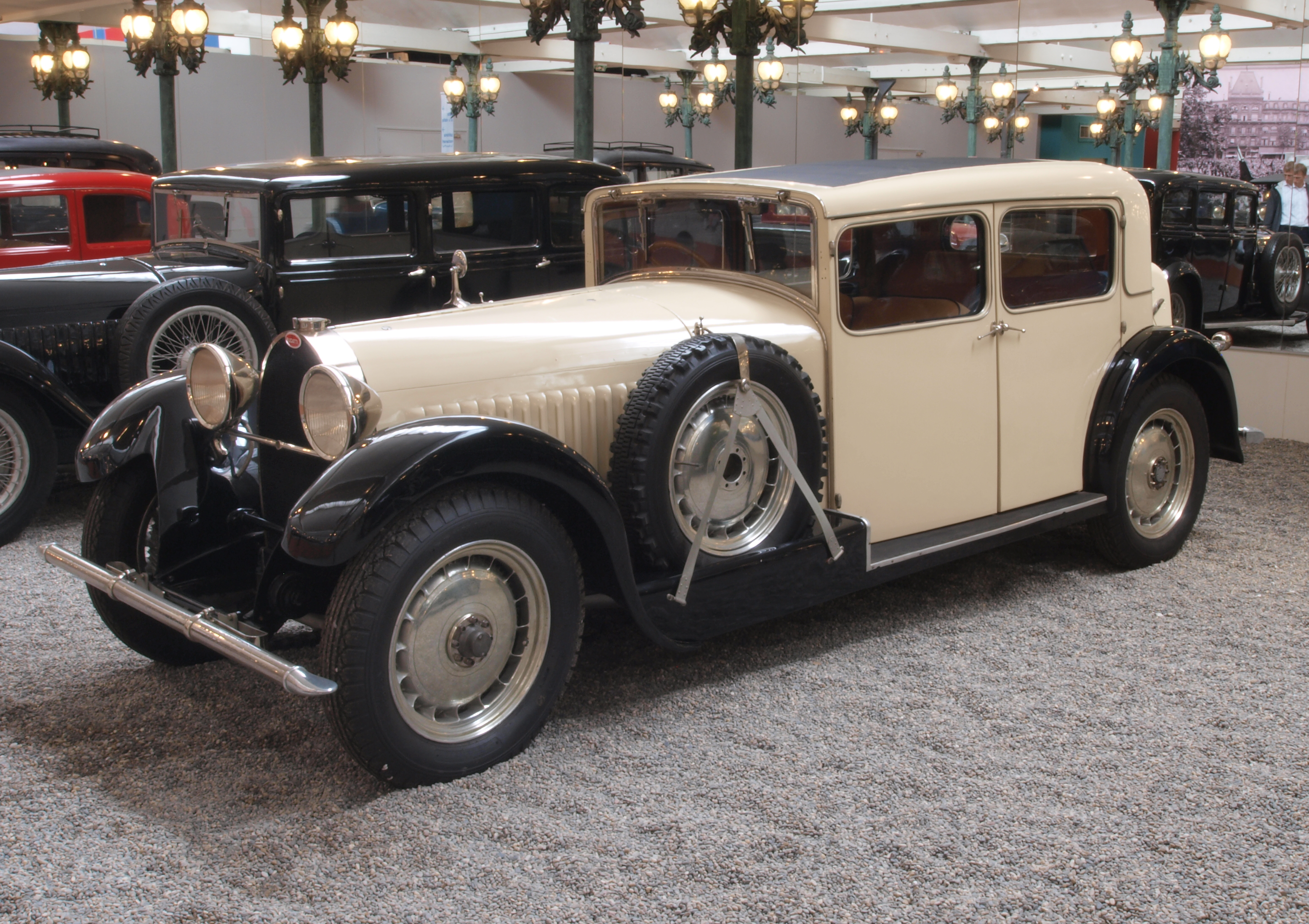
1933 Bugatti Type 46

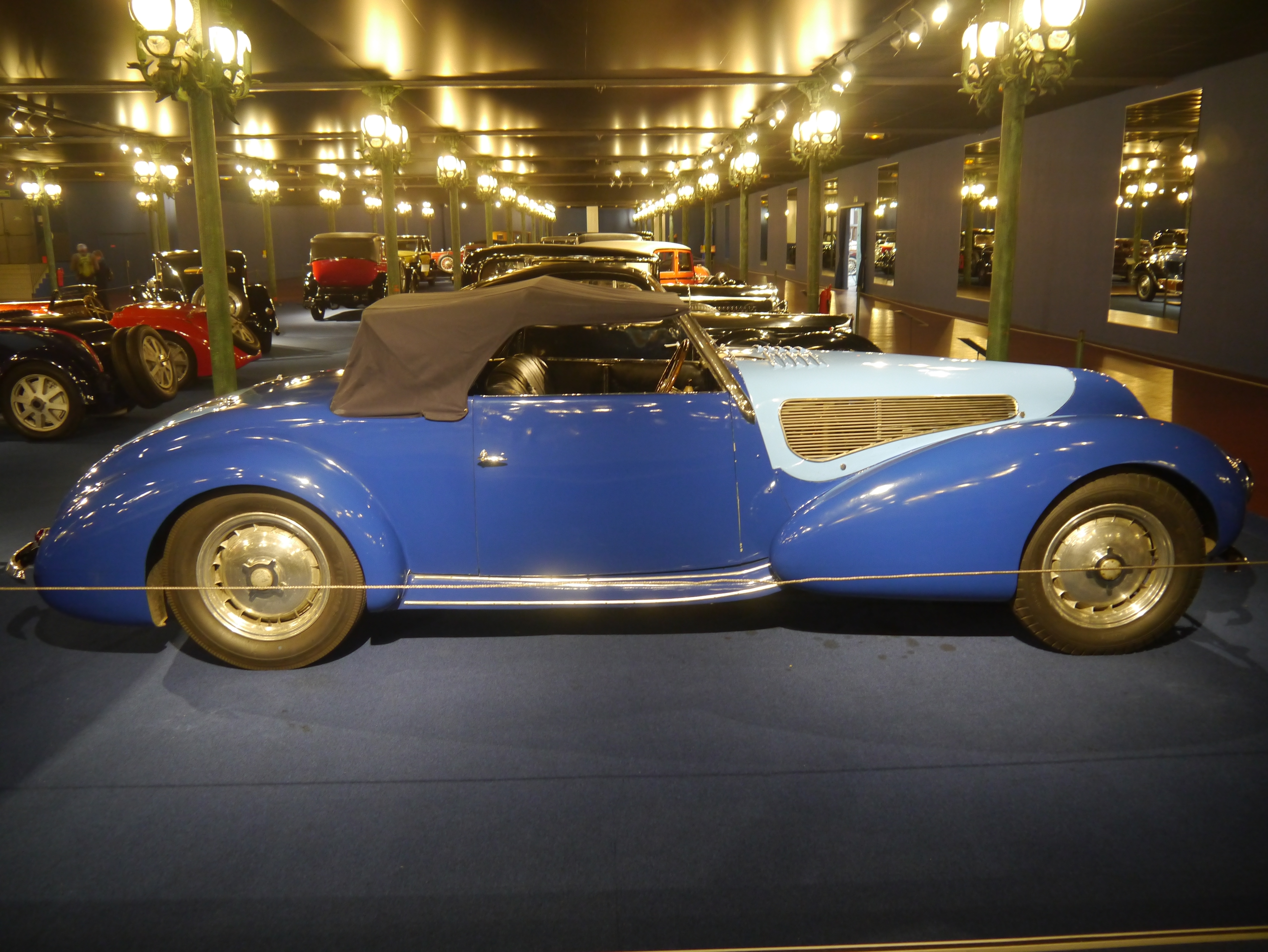
1932 Bugatti Type 50

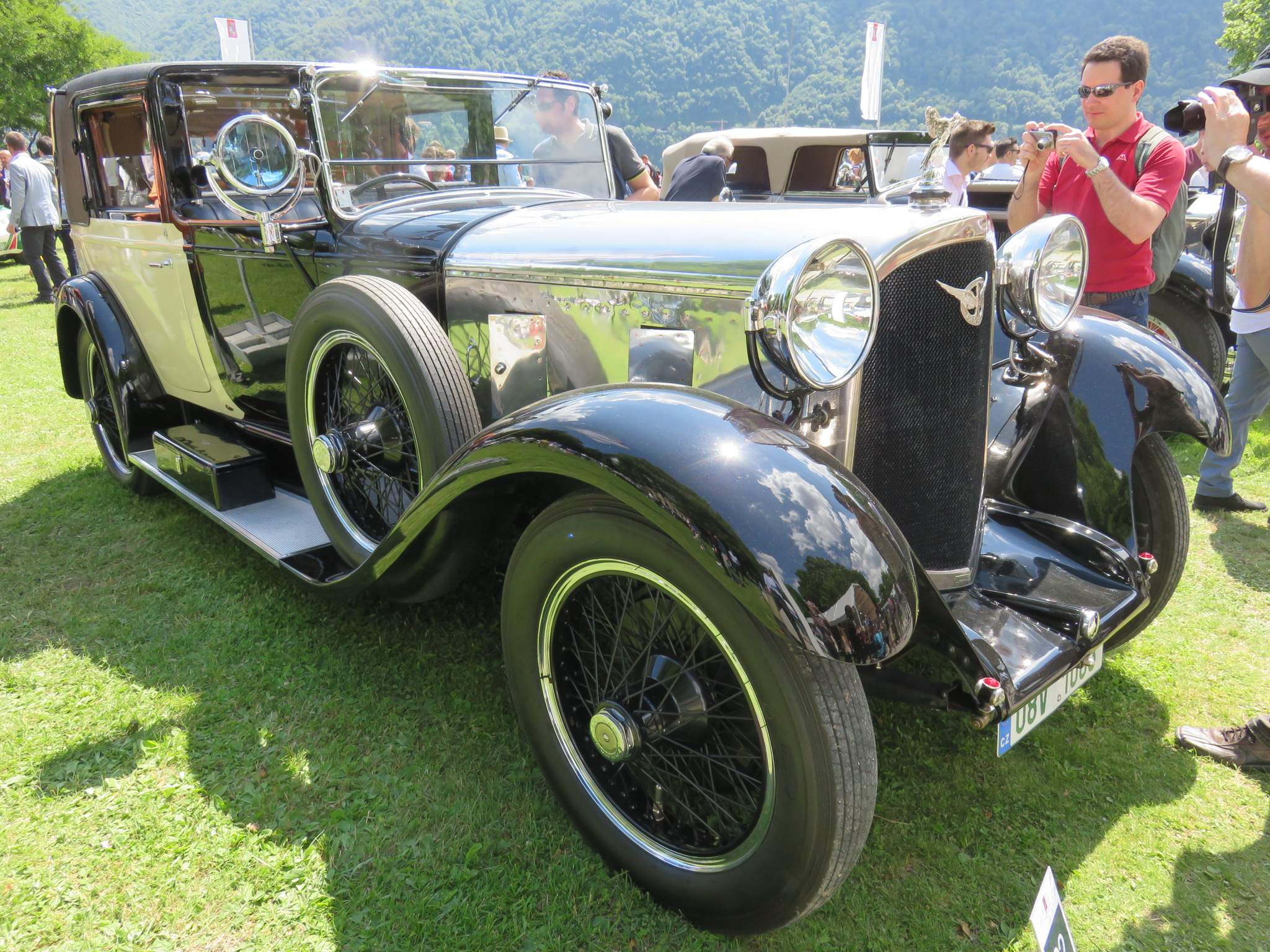
1925 Farman

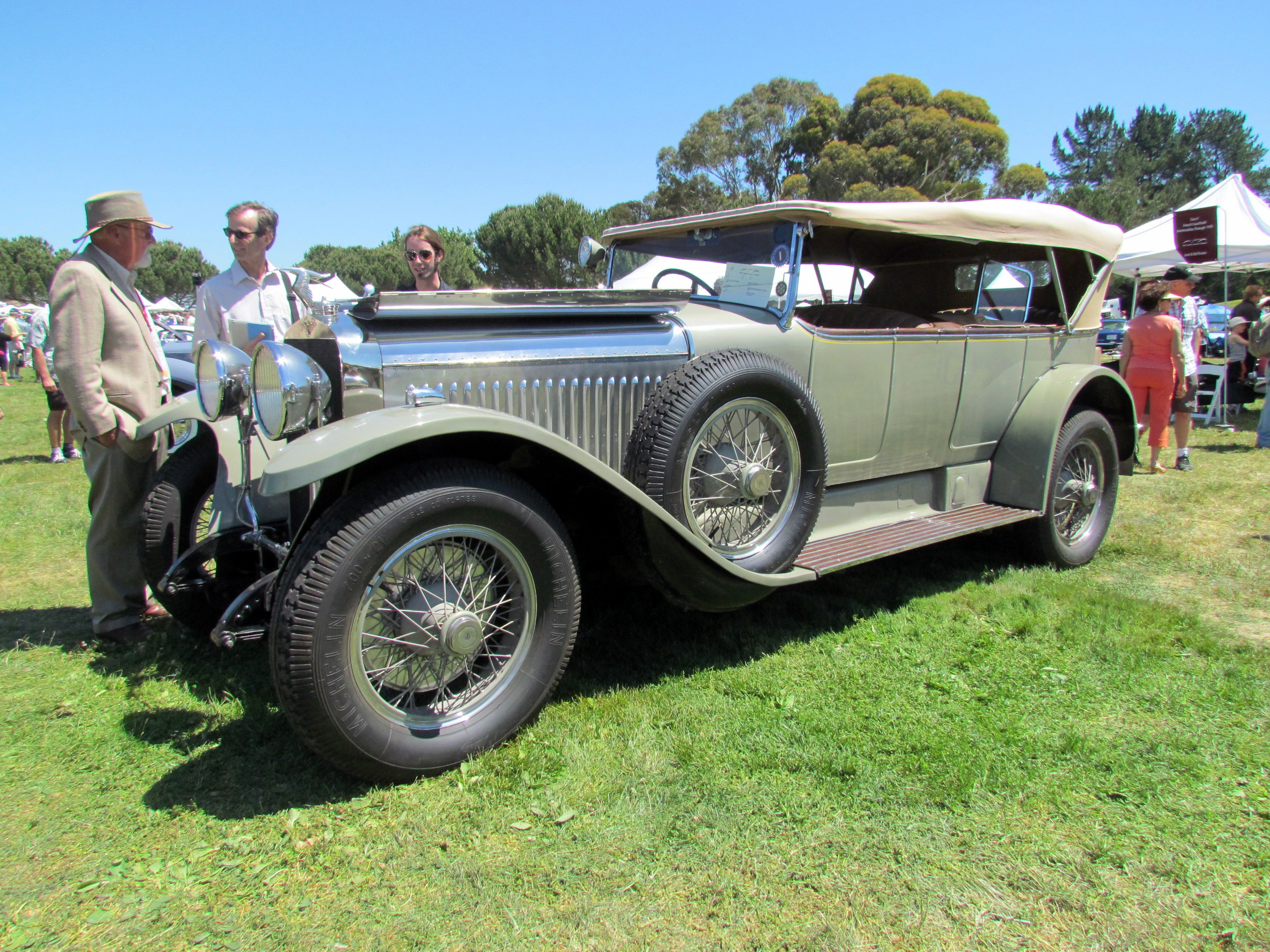
1923 Hispano-Suiza H6B

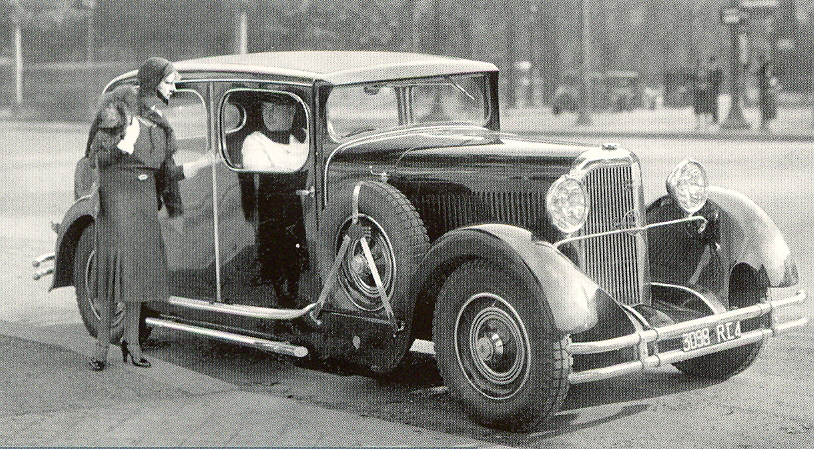
1930 Panhard & Levassor

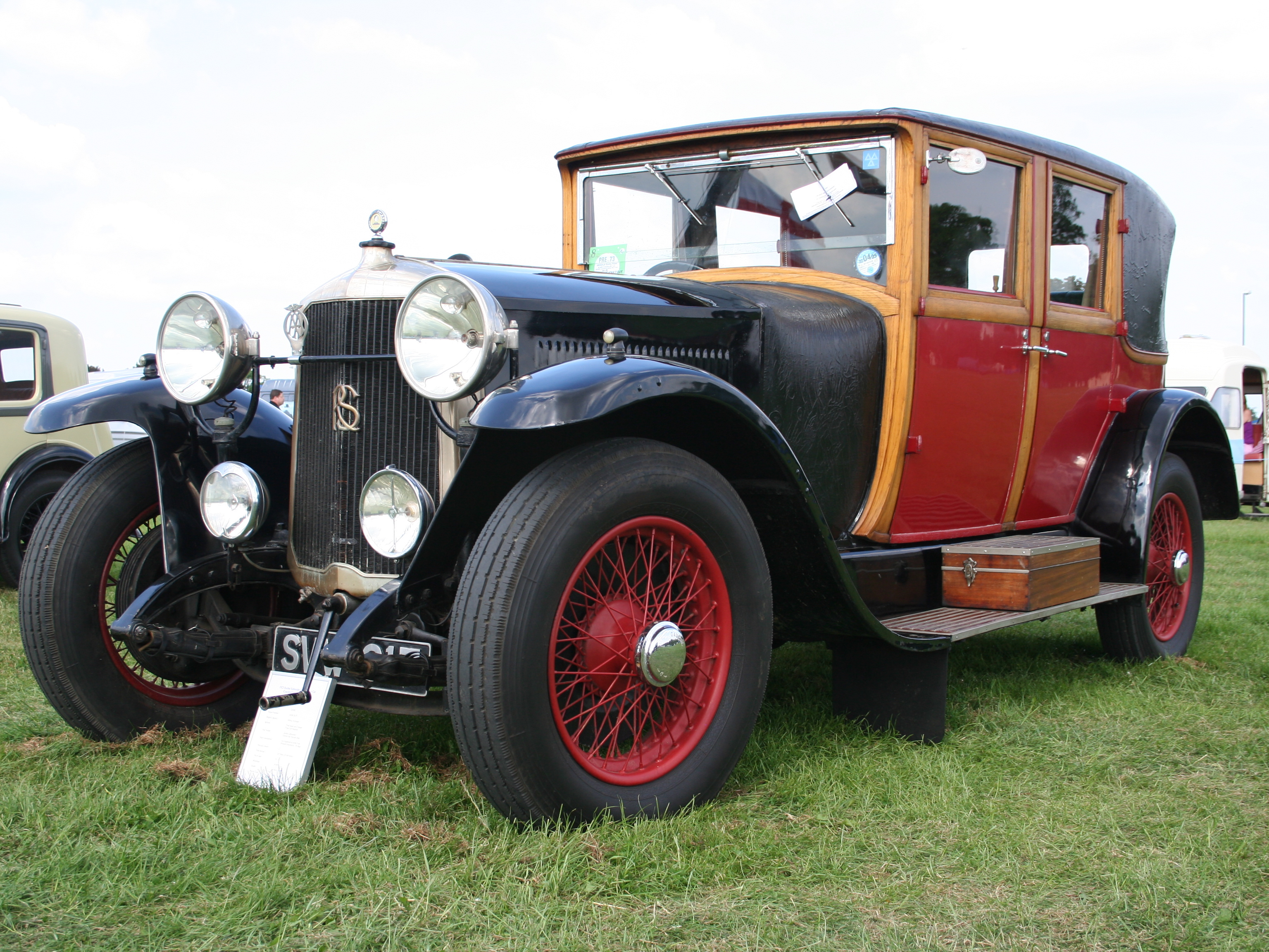
1923 Rochet Schneider 20HP
