= Marc Birkigt =

Swiss mechanical engineer (1878–1953)

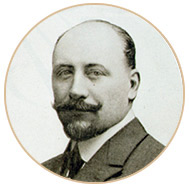
- Born: 8 March 1878; Geneva, Switzerland
- Died: 15 March 1953 (aged 75); Versoix, Switzerland

Marc Birkigt (8 March 1878, Geneva – 15 March 1953, Versoix) was a Swiss engineer, automotive and aviation pioneer, and co-founder of Hispano-Suiza in 1904.

He lived in Barcelona, Spain when he was hired by Emilio de la Cuadra in 1898 to work as an automobile engineer in Cuadra's firm La Cuadra. After several bankruptcies and changes in ownership, the firm was reborn in 1904 as the luxury automobile company Hispano-Suiza with Birkigt as chief engineer. Later he co-founded the Dewoitine company along with Émile Dewoitine. Birkigt was nominated for the Car Engineer of the Century prize for the luxurious Hispano-Suiza H6 car in the 1920s. He also won fame for the aircraft engines and guns he designed as chief engineer at Hispano-Suiza, the former including the liquid-cooled V8 engine that powered the famous French SPAD VII and SPAD XIII World War I fighters, and the British Sopwith Dolphin and S.E. 5a, whilst in the field of ordnance he created the Hispano-Suiza HS.404 20mm autocannon, which was of great importance in WW II as the main fighter gun of the RAF from 1941 onwards.

== Biography ==
=== Childhood ===
Marc was born on March 8, 1878, in Geneva, Switzerland. Son of a tailor in rue Rousseau, his mother died when he was 2 and his father when he was 12. He was raised by his grandmother.

=== Education and early working years ===
Marc entered the Geneva Mechanical School at the age of 17 from where he graduated as an engineer at the age of 20 and then worked in a company manufacturing machines and tools for watchmaking. During his military service in Switzerland, he served as gunsmith.

Aged 21, he joined Carlos Vellino (engineering school friend) in 1899 in Barcelona (industrial capital of Catalonia) and worked unsuccessfully on a prototype electric omnibus for Barcelona for the company “La Cuadra”. He then designed and manufactured two models of gasoline powered carts: a 4.5 hp single-cylinder and the 7.5-horsepower twin-cylinder La Cuadra Centauro, which in 1901 traveled 1,000 km without incident. He filed his first mechanical patents but the company went bankrupt.

=== Hispano-Suiza ===
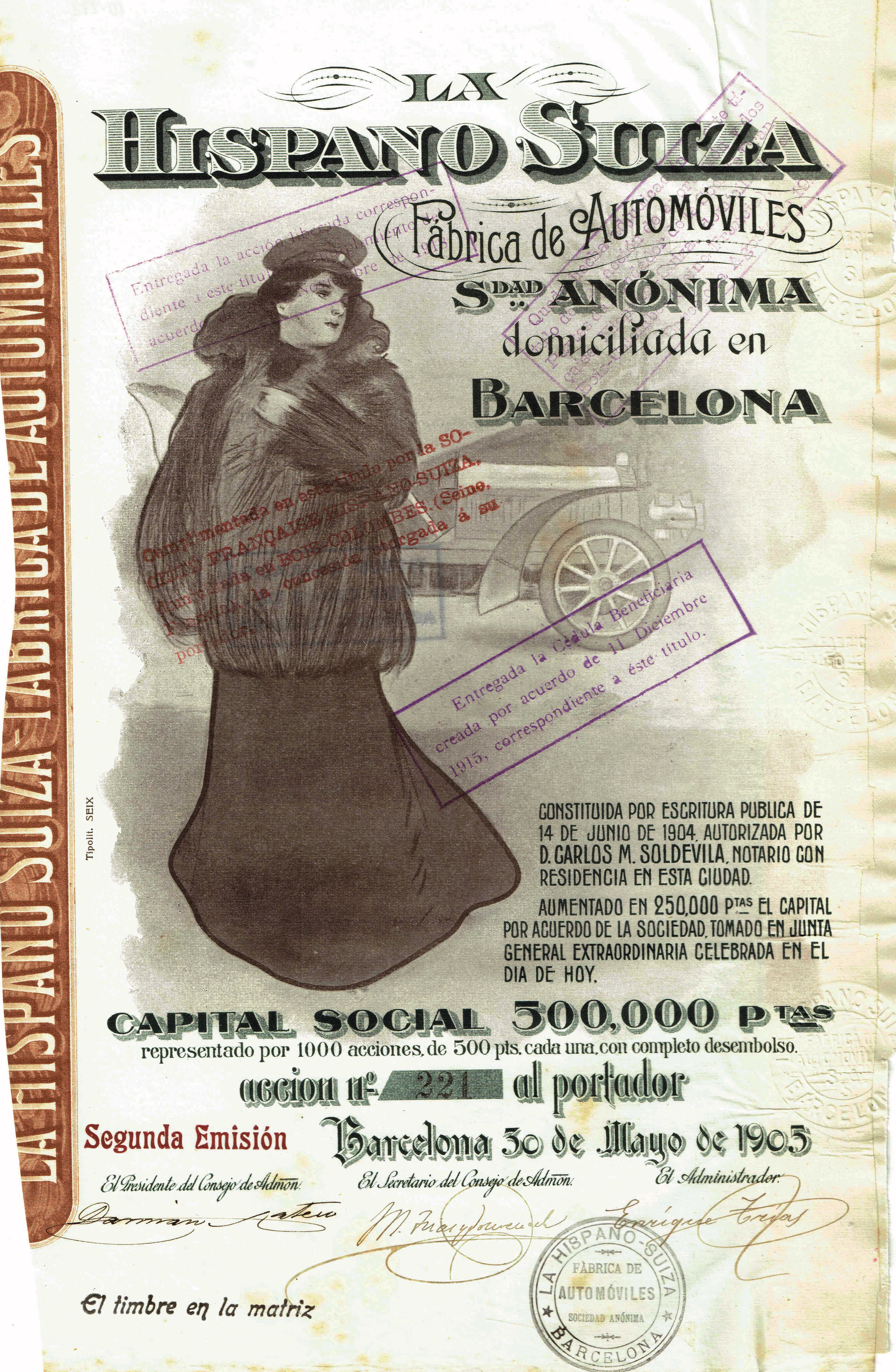
Share of the Hispano Suiza Fabrica de Automoviles SA, issued 30. May 1905

==== Early years in Spain and international development ====
Marc Birkigt founded with the financier José Castro de La Cuadra in November 1902 the José Castro s.en.c Fábrica Hispano-Suiza de Automóviles in Barcelona. They manufactured automobiles with internal combustion engines, the 10 hp, 1,873 cc twin-cylinder and the 14 hp, 2,535 cc 4-cylinder chassis. At the beginning of 1904, production was again suspended for lack of money. The Spanish businessmen Damian Mateù and Francisco Seix then finance on June 14, 1904, the new company Hispano-Suiza Fabrica de Automóviles SA in Barcelona.

King Alfonso XIII of Spain ordered a 20/24 hp Hispano-Suiza chassis and assured the company of his full support. He awarded Birkigt the title of Knight of Isabella the Catholic in 1908.

A new factory was built in Sagrera and sales offices were created in Geneva and Paris, then in the rest of Europe.

A sales license was granted to the Swiss company SAG (Société d'automobiles à Genève) of Lucien Pictet and Paul Piccard. The latter marketed the Hispano-Suiza models under this name until 1908.

Marc Birkigt presented two new chassis at the 1907 show: a 4-cylinder 40/45 hp and an imposing 6-cylinder 60/75 hp with 11 litres of displacement decorated with the brand's emblem: two wings (symbol of speed), in the center a white cross (Swiss symbol) on the Spanish colors.

In January 1911, Marc Birkigt moved to Paris with a new factory in Levallois and then in Bois-Colombes in 1914 with agencies all over the world. King Alfonso XIII was then one of the main shareholders of the brand.

==== Success of aircraft engines in France ====
In 1914 when the First World War broke out, the factories were placed under the control of the company Gnome et Rhône. Marc Birkigt then developed a light aircraft engine in Barcelona for the Spanish government. The 150 hp Hispano-Suiza 8 a 90° V8 engine introduced the innovative concept of light alloy cylinder blocks. From 1915 the French air force successfully equipped itself with 40,000 of these engines, which enabled them to fight on equal terms with their German counterparts. This machine powered the SPAD S.VII plane of the Stork Squadron ace Georges Guynemer; and so the stork is now associated with Hispano-Suiza.

At the end of the war Marc Birkigt returned to Paris. He devoted himself to luxury automobiles such as the Hispano-Suiza H6, to take advantage of the new fortunes made during the war.

==== In between two wars until the 1950s ====
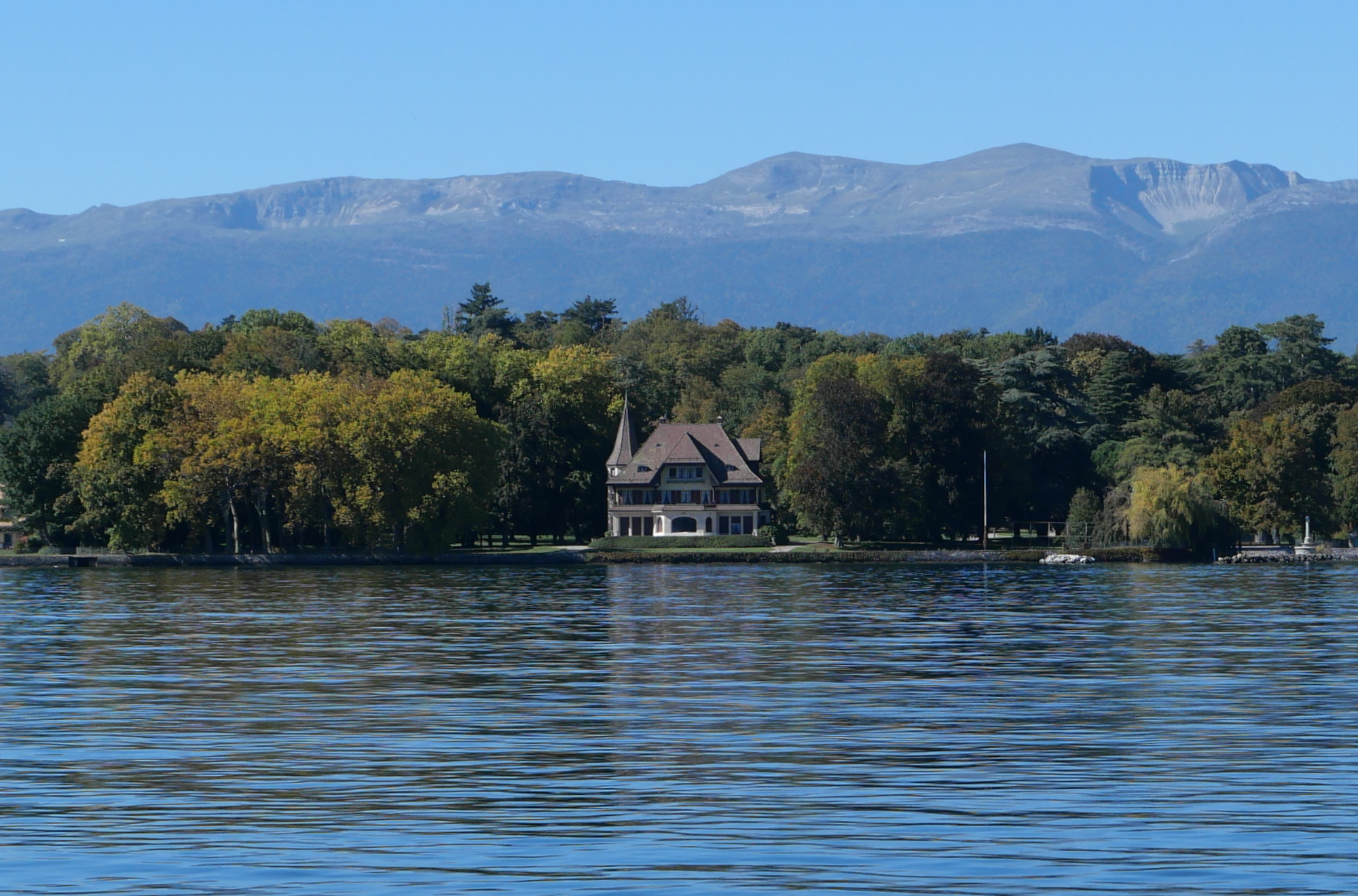
The Maître Mansion, aka "Rive Bleu", on the Route de Lausanne 392-394 in Versoix Geneva, Switzerland, commissioned by Birkigt, designed by architect Henry Baudin (1876-1929), constructed between 1926 and 1928, and decorated by the artist Éric Hermès (1881–1971).

In 1923, the French subsidiary acquired its independence and was baptized Hispano-Suiza. Birkigt joined forces with Michelin in the 1930s to create a railcar: the famous Micheline.

After having built more than 2,500 chassis, Hispano Suiza was nationalized by the French state in 1936. Marc Birkigt stopped manufacturing automobiles and devoted himself to aircraft engines and automatic weapons for French national defense. The result is the Hispano-Suiza 12X engine derived from the V8; one of the first engines of the 1000 hp (750 kW) class in the Hispano-Suiza 12Y version, produced under license and developed in Czechoslovakia, Spain, Switzerland and the USSR. The Hispano-Suiza HS-404 aircraft gun was also designed and widely adopted by the British and American armed forces during World War II.

At the end of World War II, the factories of Bois-Colombes and Tarbes were in ruins and looted. It then relaunched in the manufacture of aircraft reactors (Rolls-Royce), aviation accessories (thrust reversers, gas turbines, landing gear, diesel engines ...)

=== Private life ===
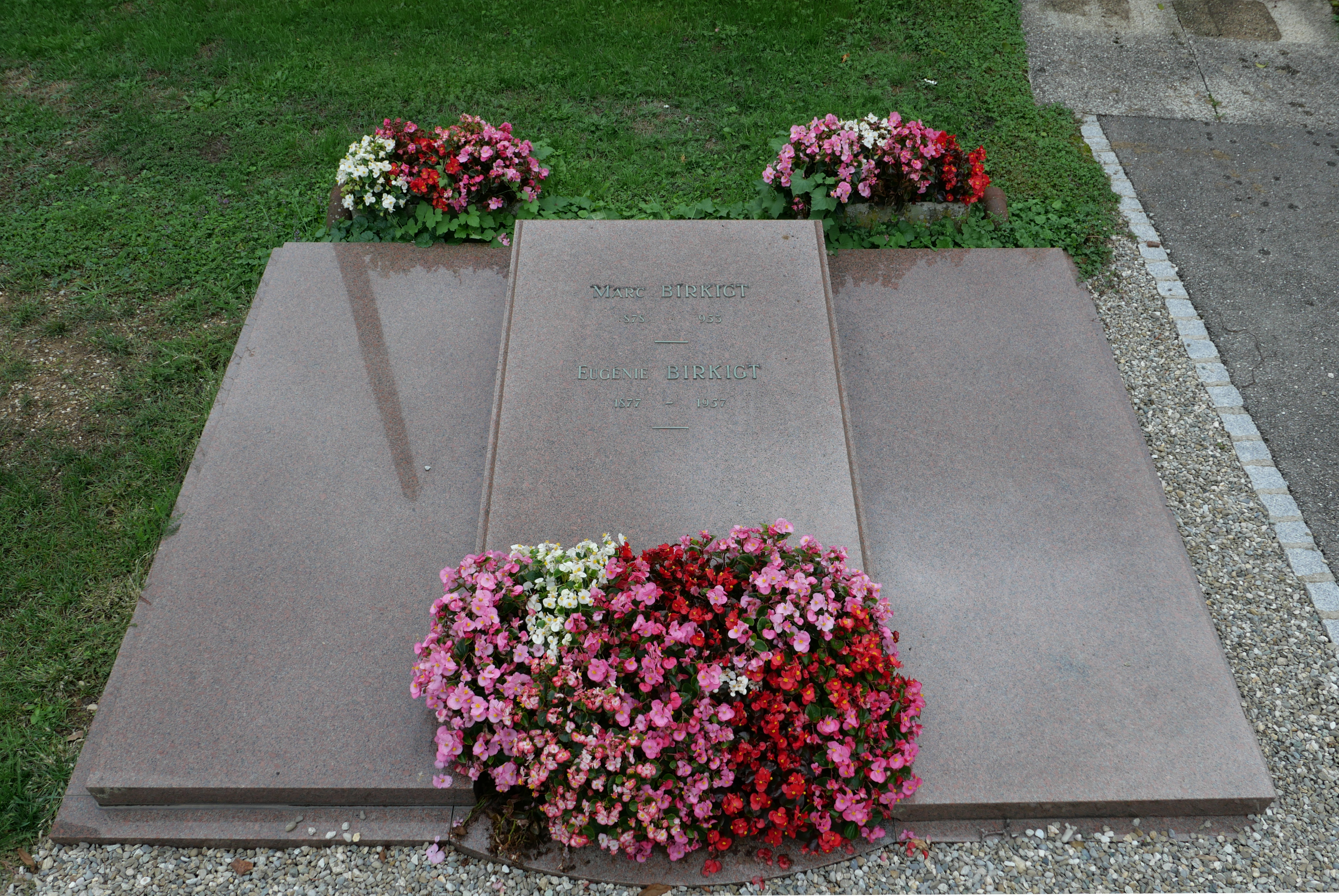
The tomb of Marc and Eugénie Birkigt in Versoix Geneva, Switzerland

Marc Birkigt married Eugénie Brachet in Geneva on November 23, 1901. From their union were born Louis in 1903 and Yvonne in 1905.

He lived in Versoix Geneva, Switzerland, since 1930 in his sumptuous “Rive-bleu” residence on the shores of Lake Geneva facing the Mont-Blanc massif.

He died on March 15, 1953, at the age of 75, after having filed more than 150 patents.

He is buried together with his wife Eugénie in Versoix Geneva, Switzerland.

== Décorations ==
- 1908 : Chevalier de l'ordre d'Isabelle la Catholique
- 1930 « Commandeur » then « Grand officier » in 1939 of the Légion d'honneur
- 1923 and 1949 : Laureate of the l'Aéro-Club de France
- Docteur honoris causa of l’École polytechnique fédérale de Zurich

== See also ==
- Hispano-Suiza
