= Grosser Mercedes =

Grosser Mercedes (correct: Großer Mercedes) is an unofficial name given to two large luxury automobiles made by Mercedes-Benz:

- the Mercedes-Benz 770, made from 1930 to 1944, and
- the Mercedes-Benz 600, made from 1963 to 1981.

The translation simply means "large" or "grand" Mercedes.
