= Mercedes 24/100/140 PS =

Mercedes 24/100/140 PS (aka Mercedes-Benz Typ 630)
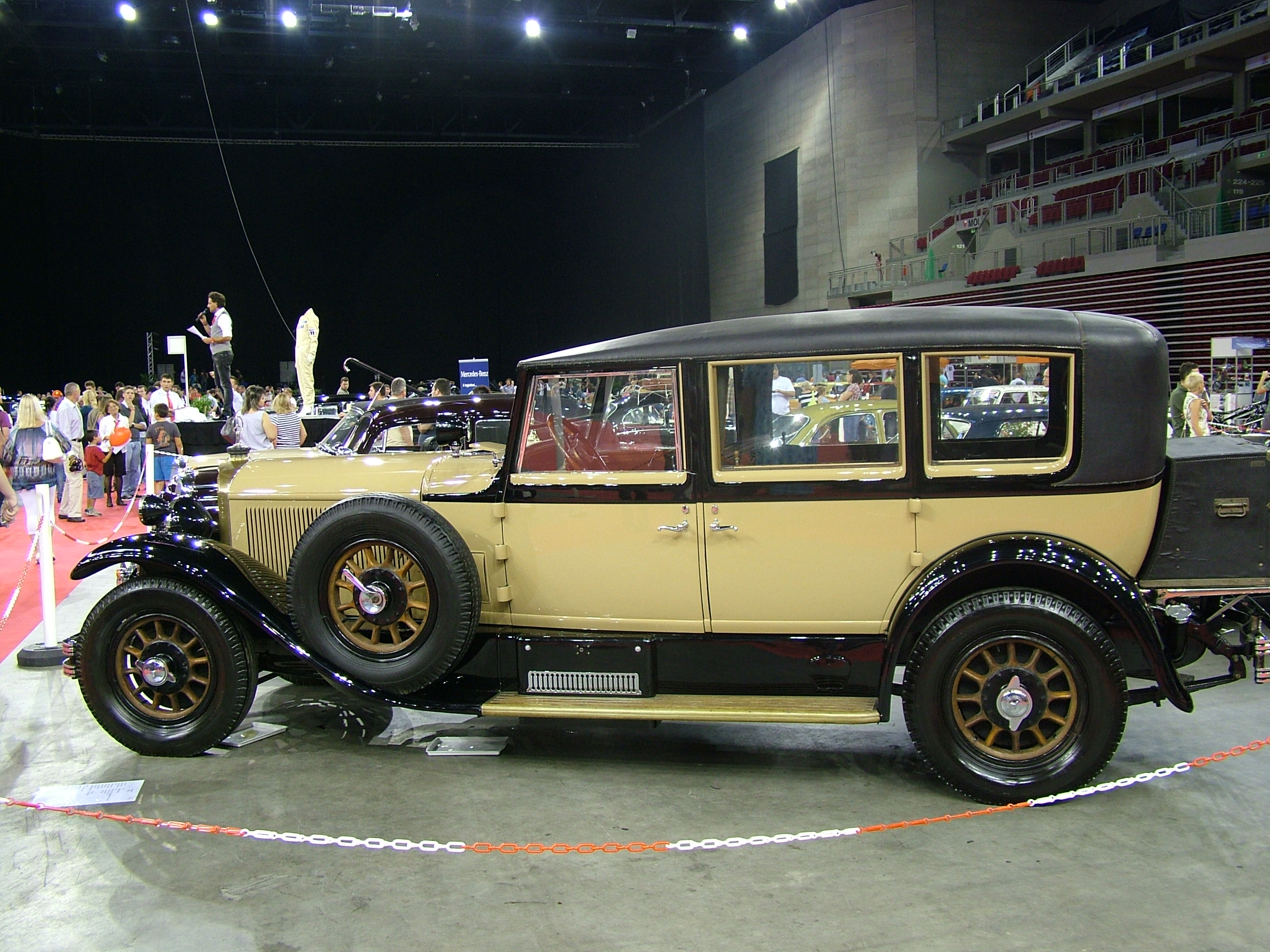
- Mercedes-Benz 24/100/140 PS (1927)

Overview
- Manufacturer: Daimler-Motoren-Gesellschaft (1924–1926); Daimler-Benz AG (1926–1929)
- Also called: Mercedes 24/100/140 PS (1924–1926); Mercedes-Benz 24/100/140 PS (1926–1929); Mercedes-Benz Typ 630 (1926–1929); High performance variant: Mercedes-Benz Modell K (1926–1929); Mercedes-Benz 24/110/160 PS (1926–1929)
- Production: 1924–1929
- Assembly: Germany: Stuttgart

Body and chassis
- Class: Full-size luxury car
- Body style: Torpedo bodied “Tourenwagen” ”Limousine” (sedan/saloon); Landaulet; 4-door Cabriolet; Many customers purchased the base chassis and commissioned the bodies separately
- Layout: FR layout

Powertrain
- Engine: 6,240cc Inline six cylinder ohc engine with ”Kompressor”

Dimensions
- Wheelbase: 3,750 mm (148 in)
- Length: 5,085 mm (200.2 in)
- Width: 1,780 mm (70 in)
- Height: 1,950 mm (77 in)

Chronology
- Successor: Mercedes-Benz 770

Mercedes-Benz 24/100/140 PS
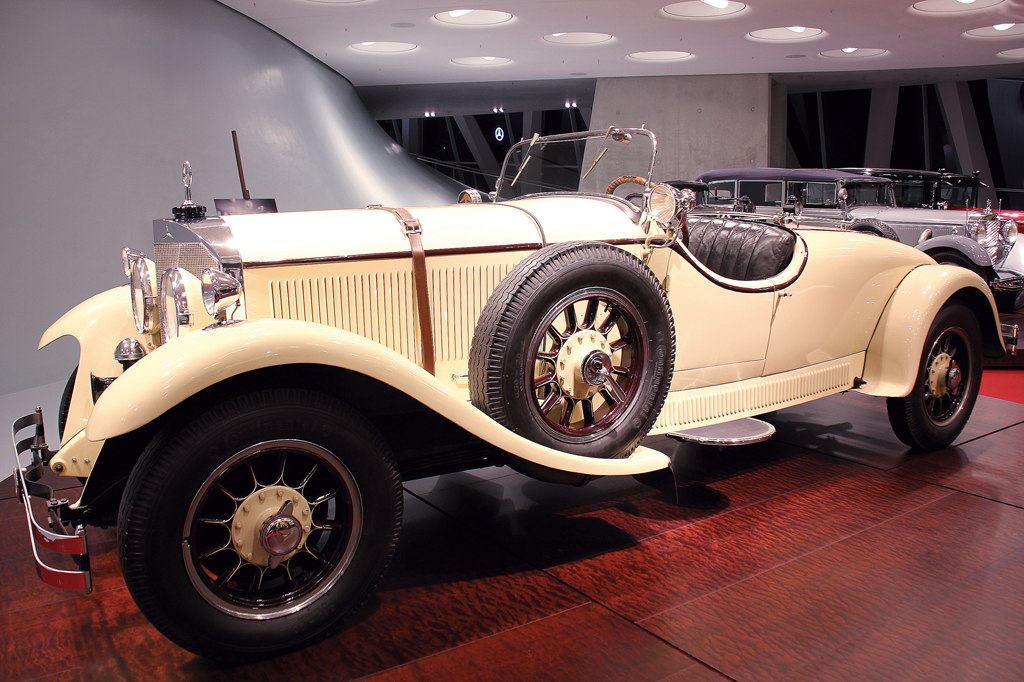
- Mercedes-Benz 24/100/140 PS Roadster (1926)

The Mercedes 24/100/140 PS was a large luxury car introduced by Daimler of Untertürkheim in 1924. Production continued until 1929 by which time Daimler had merged with Benz & Cie (effective 1926) and the car's name changed to Mercedes-Benz Typ 630. The car was conceptually and structurally similar to the contemporary Mercedes 15/70/100 PS, but the 24/100/140 PS was longer, heavier, more powerful, faster and more expensive.

A still more powerful Mercedes-Benz Modell K sports car version, sometimes known as the Mercedes-Benz 24/110/160 PS, was offered between 1926 and 1929.

A defining feature of the cars was the switchable supercharger (”Kompressor”) fitted to the engine.

== Origins ==
Plans for the car were drawn up by the company's Technical Director, Paul Daimler, son of the company's founder. Following an acrimonious disagreement about new model policy, Daimler left in 1922, transferring to rival manufacturer Horch. It was left to Daimler's successor, Technical Director Ferdinand Porsche, arriving at the plant from Austria in April 1923, to complete the development and handle the launch of the 24/100/140 PS. The strategy for the model's development, which used knowledge gained on the race track from the company's successful racing cars to develop a large, fast, and very expensive road car, appears to have been similar under both men.

== Naming conventions and horsepower ==
By the car's launch year of 1924 Daimler had already for many years been branding their cars with the name “Mercedes”. Otherwise the manufacturer applied the widely followed German naming conventions of the time. On the Mercedes 24/100/140 PS the “24” defined the car's tax horsepower, used by the authorities to determine the level of annual car tax to be imposed on car owners. The “100” and the “140” both defined the manufacturer's claims regarding car's actual power output as defined in metric horsepower. In Germany tax horsepower, which had been defined by statute since 1906, was based on the dimensions of the cylinders in the engine. Unlike the systems used elsewhere in Europe, the German tax horsepower calculation took account both of the cylinder bore and of the cylinder stroke, and there was therefore a direct linear relationship between engine size and tax horsepower.

The unusual feature in the naming of this car was the inclusion of two different power output figures. This arose from the fitting to the engine of a switchable supercharger (”Kompressor”). In normal operation maximum claimed output was 100 PS (74 kW; 99 hp). With the supercharger invoked this rose to 140 PS (103 kW; 138 hp).

The 24/100/140 PS was one of two Daimler models to survive the fusion of Daimler with Benz & Cie signed in 1924 that came into effect in 1926. However, cars of the newly merged company were now branded “Mercedes-Benz” and the model also acquired the new model name “Typ 630”, being now known as the Mercedes-Benz Typ 630 The alternative name Mercedes-Benz 24/100/140 PS was and is also sometimes used.

== The car ==
=== Bodies ===
Many buyers purchased the car in bare chassis form and acquired bodywork separately from an independent coach builder. Early adopters of the Mercedes 24/100/140 PS included the then-octogenarian Reichspräsident Paul von Hindenburg, whose 1929 presidential Type 630 featured a Pullman-Landaulet body by coachbuilders Jos.Neuss of Berlin.

Among the manufacturer's listed body types were a four or (from 1925) six seater Torpedo bodied “Tourenwagen”, a six-seater ”Pullman-Limousine”, a six-seater “Landaulet”, a six-seater “Coupe-Limousine” and a 4-door four seater Cabriolet.

=== The engine ===
The six cylinder in-line 6240 cc engine featured an overhead camshaft which at the time was an unusual feature, with “bevel linkage”. However, it was the switchable supercharger (”Kompressor”), adopted from the company's racing cars, that attracted most of the attention. With the device switched off maximum claimed output was of 100 PS (74 kW; 99 hp) at 3,100 rpm: with the supercharger operating, maximum output rose to 140 PS (103 kW; 138 hp).

The top speed listed was 115 km/h (71 mph) or 120 km/h (75 mph) depending on which of the two offered final drive ratios was fitted.

=== Chassis and running gear ===
Power was transmitted to the rear wheels via a multi-plate dry disc clutch (“Mehrscheibentrockenkupplung”) and a four speed manual transmission. The gear lever was initially to the driver's right, directly outside the door, but at some stage it was repositioned to what has subsequently become a more conventional location in the middle of the floor to the driver's left. (At this time it was still normal in western Europe for the steering wheel and therefore also the driver to be placed on the right side of the car.)

The suspension configuration followed the conventions of the time, using rigid beam axles and semi-elliptic leaf springs. Braking operated on all four wheels using a cable linkage.

== Evolution ==
The car changed very little during its production life. The name change to Mercedes-Benz Typ 630 which followed the Daimler/Benz fusion was not accompanied by any changes to the car. However, in 1927 the centre of gravity was lowered as a result of a switch to an underslung chassis which left the axles directly above the longitudinal chassis members, whereas earlier car had applied the “Hochbett” overslung chassis layout whereby the longitudinal chassis members were attached directly above the axles.

In 1928 the effectiveness of the brakes was increased through the addition of a vacuum powered support (“Saugluftunterstützung”).

In 1929 it became possible to specify in the Mercedes-Benz Typ 630 the high performance 110 PS (81 kW; 108 hp) / to 160 PS (118 kW; 158 hp) engine which, since 1928, had been available only on the sports car bodied Mercedes-Benz Modell K. The extra price for the “Blower” version was 2,000 Marks, equivalent to approximately 8% of the total price for a car with a “normal” Typ 630 engine.

== High performance specials ==
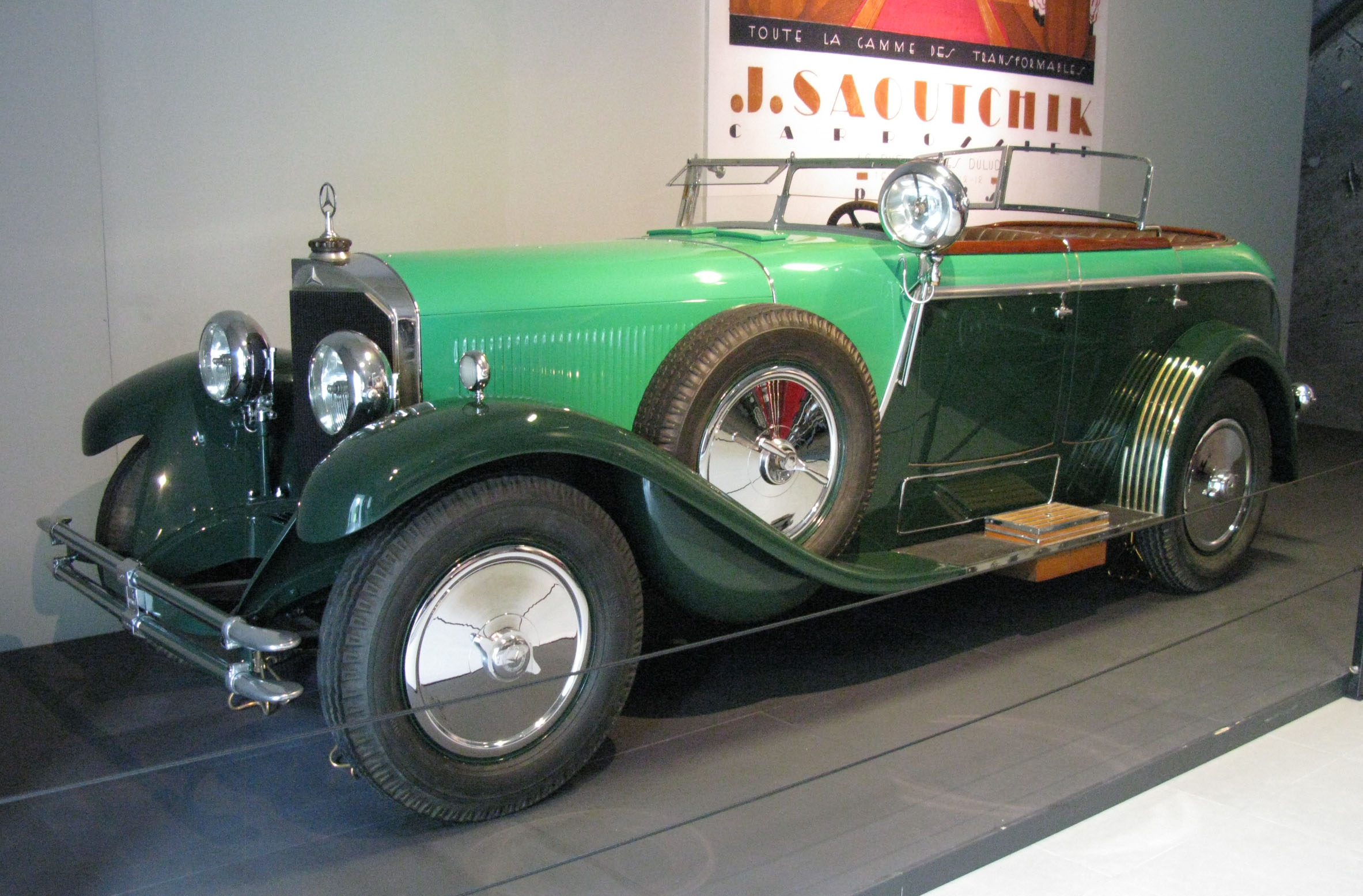
1926 Modell K

At the same time as the newly renamed "Typ 630" appeared, in 1926, the manufacturer introduced the Mercedes-Benz Modell K which used the same engine and the same overall chassis architecture, except that the wheelbase was shortened by 350 mm (14 in) to 3,400 mm (130 in) . The "K" stands for "kurzer Radstand" (short wheelbase), This car was available as a four-door “Sports four seater” or as a two-door “Roadster”. From the right side of the bonnet/hood emerged three stout metal pipes carrying the car's exhaust gases, merging at the lower edge of the bonnet/hood into a large single exhaust pipe. This detail later became a hallmark of Mercedes-Benz ”Kompressor” cars. The top speed of the sports car was listed as 145 km/h (90 mph).

From 1928 the Modell K received a still more powerful "Kompressor engine", although there was no change to the overall engine size. Stated power now increased to 110 PS (81 kW; 108 hp) or, with the compressor switched on, 160 PS (118 kW; 158 hp). The official performance figures were unchanged.

== Commercial ==
Production data are not available for the car's early years, but following the merger which created “Mercedes-Benz” 377 of the 630Ks were produced, broken down across the four years between 1926 and 1929 as 12 cars, 44 cars, 299 cars and 22 cars. In addition the manufacturer produced 267 high performance “Modell K” (24/110/160 PS) versions.

== Gallery ==
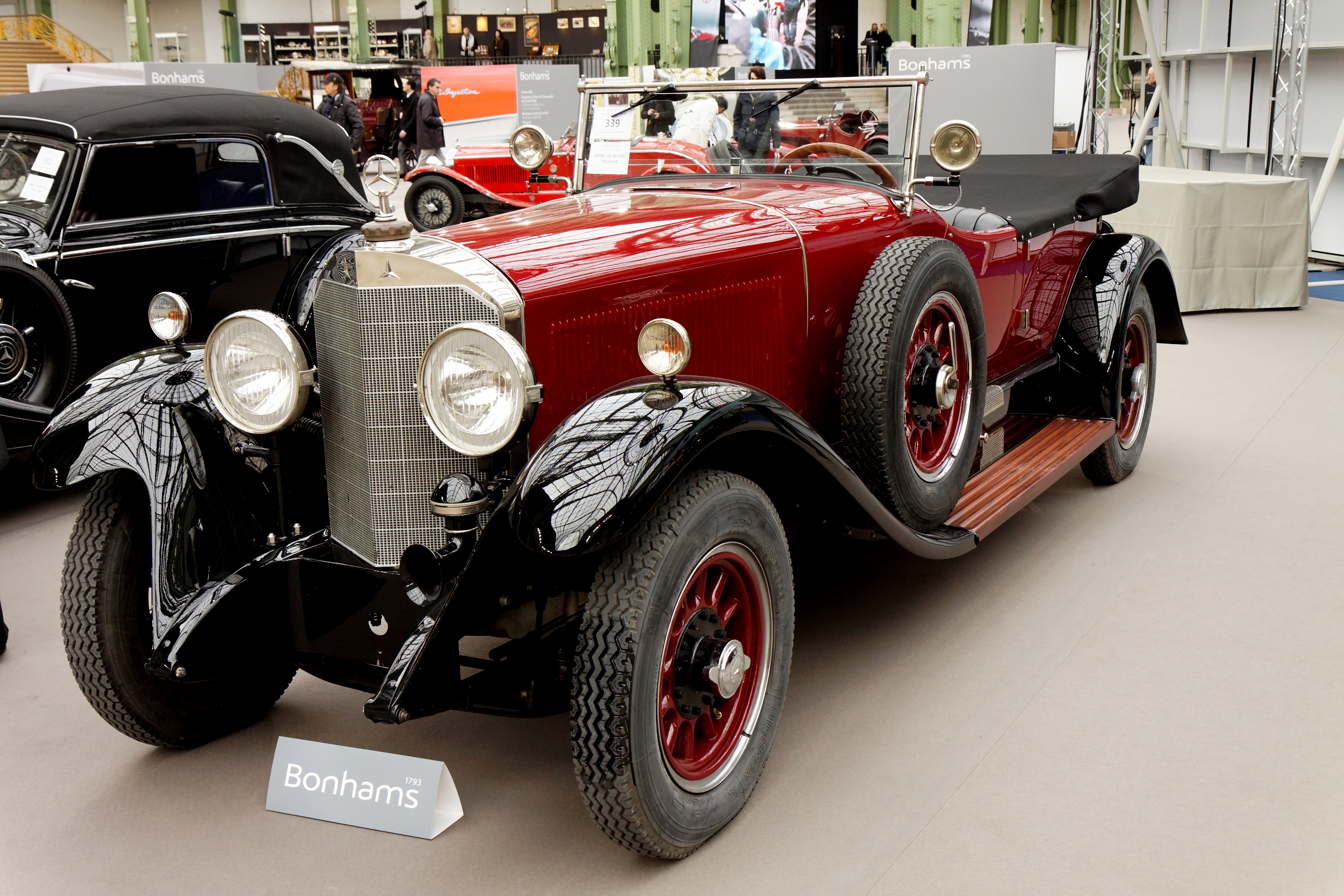
1929 Mercedes-Benz 630K Tourer

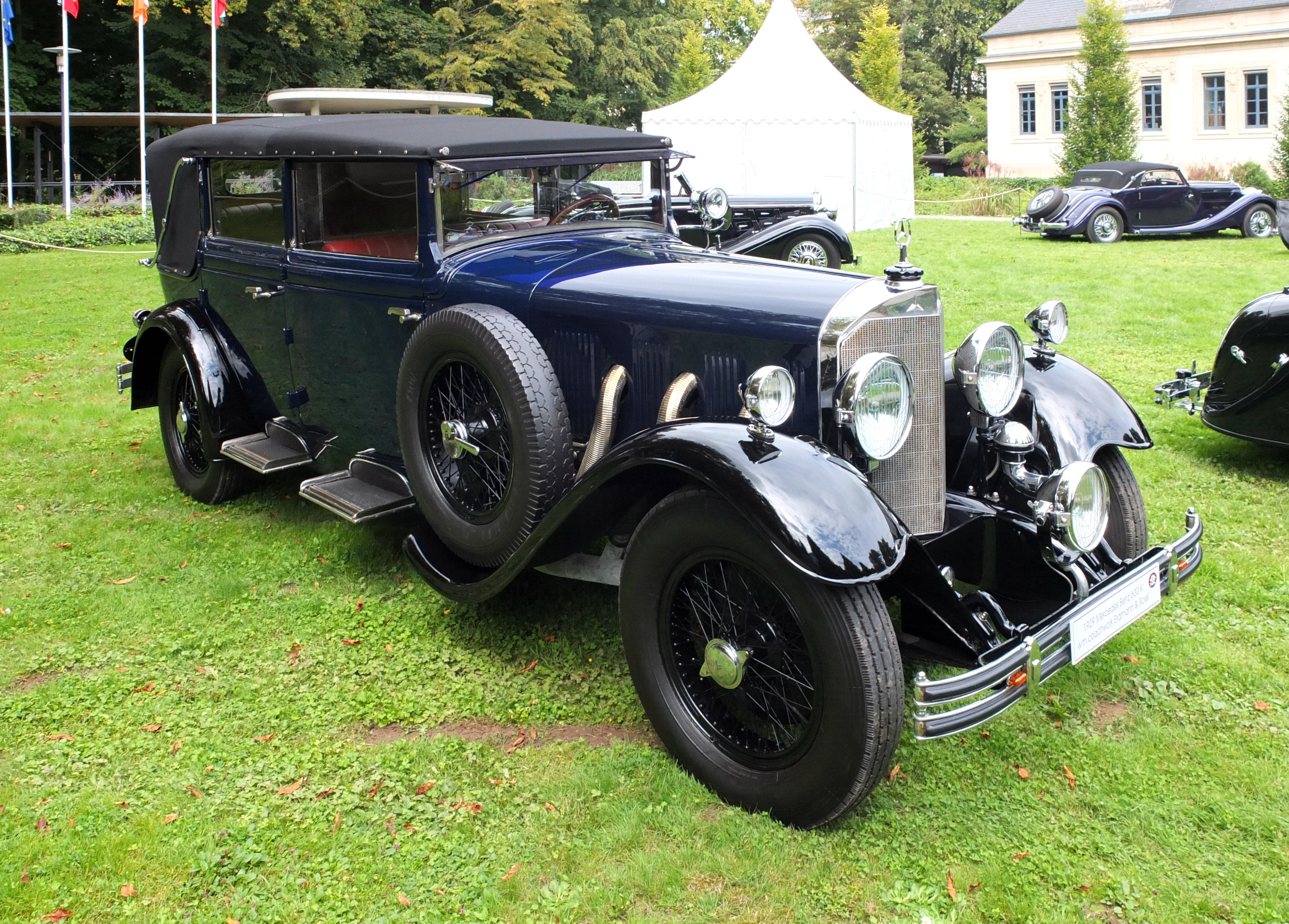
Mercedes-Benz 630 K Cabriolet, built 1929, coachwork by Erdmann & Rossi

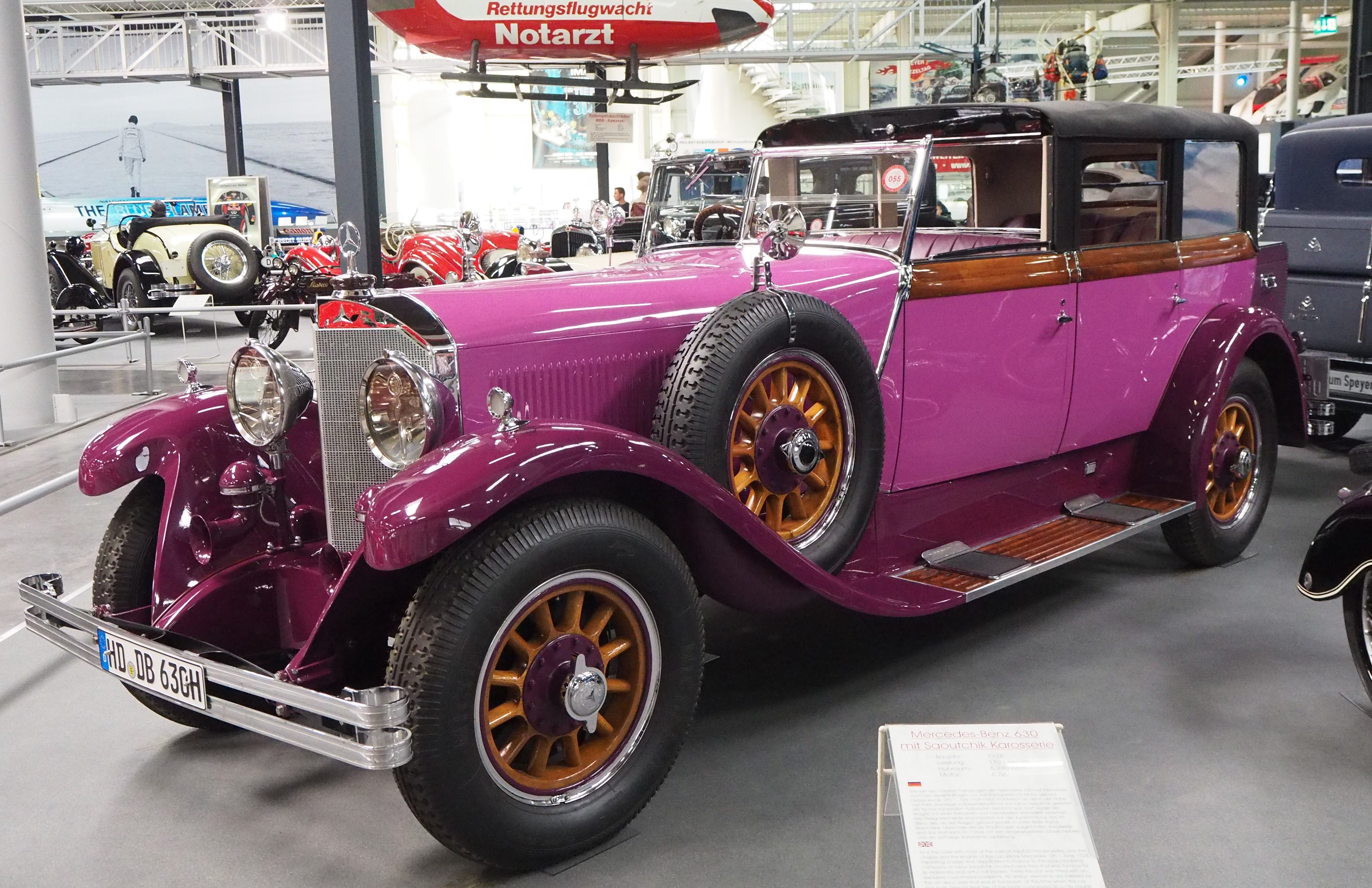
Mercedes-Benz 630K Cabriolet by Saoutchik

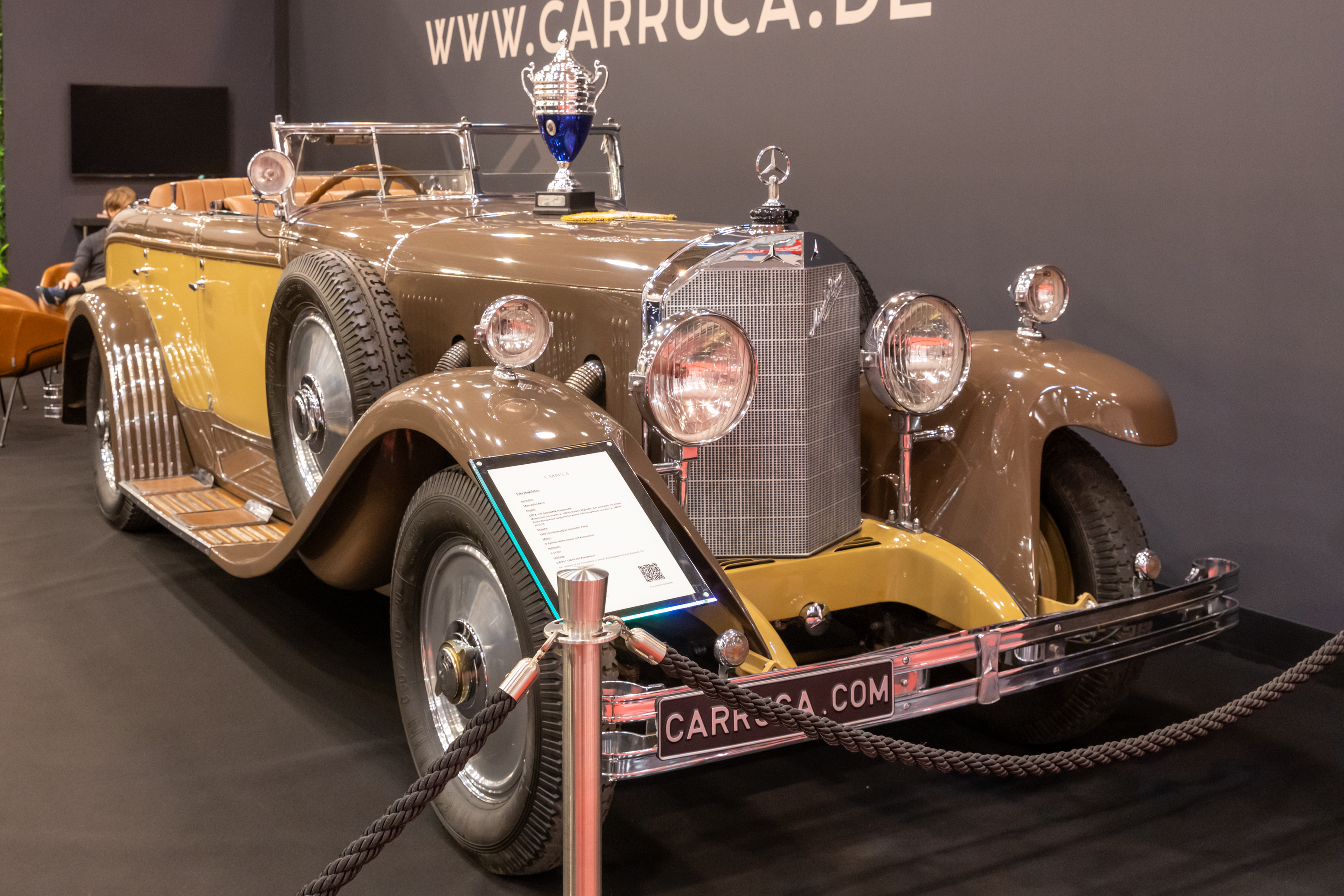
Mercedes-Benz 630 K with body by Saoutchik

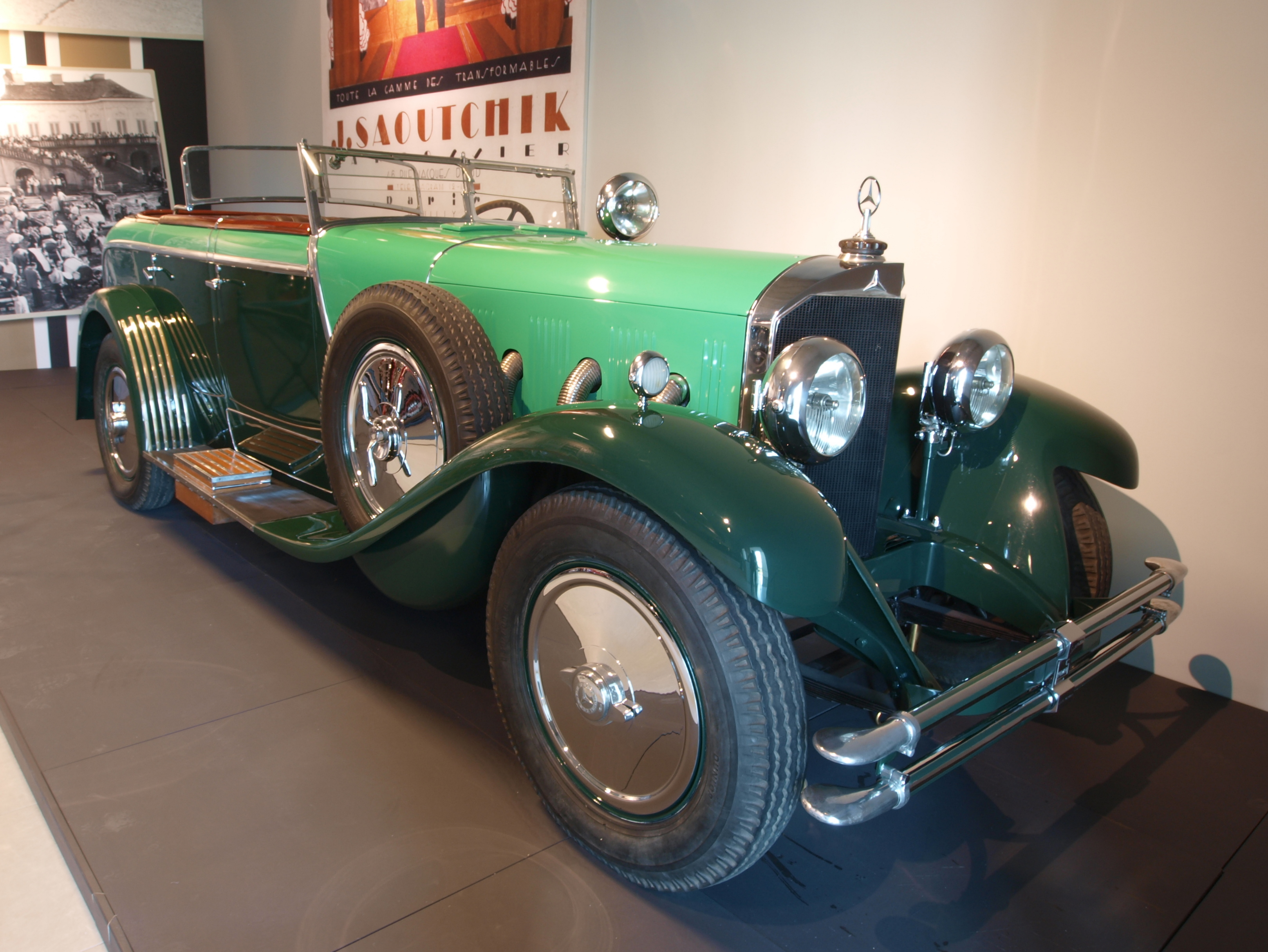
1926 Mercedes-Benz K Torpedo by Saoutchik

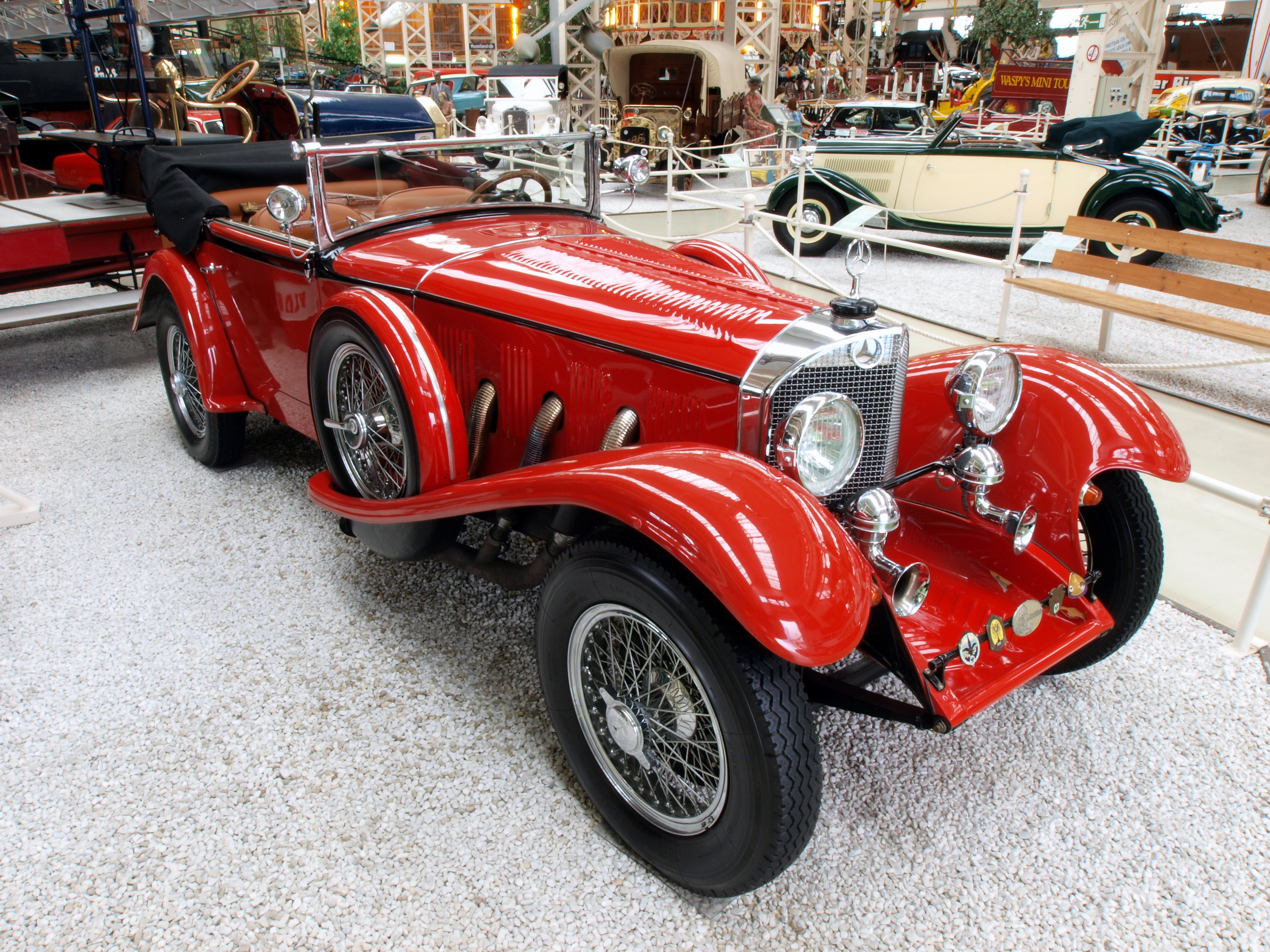
1928 Mercedes Benz 630 Kompressor

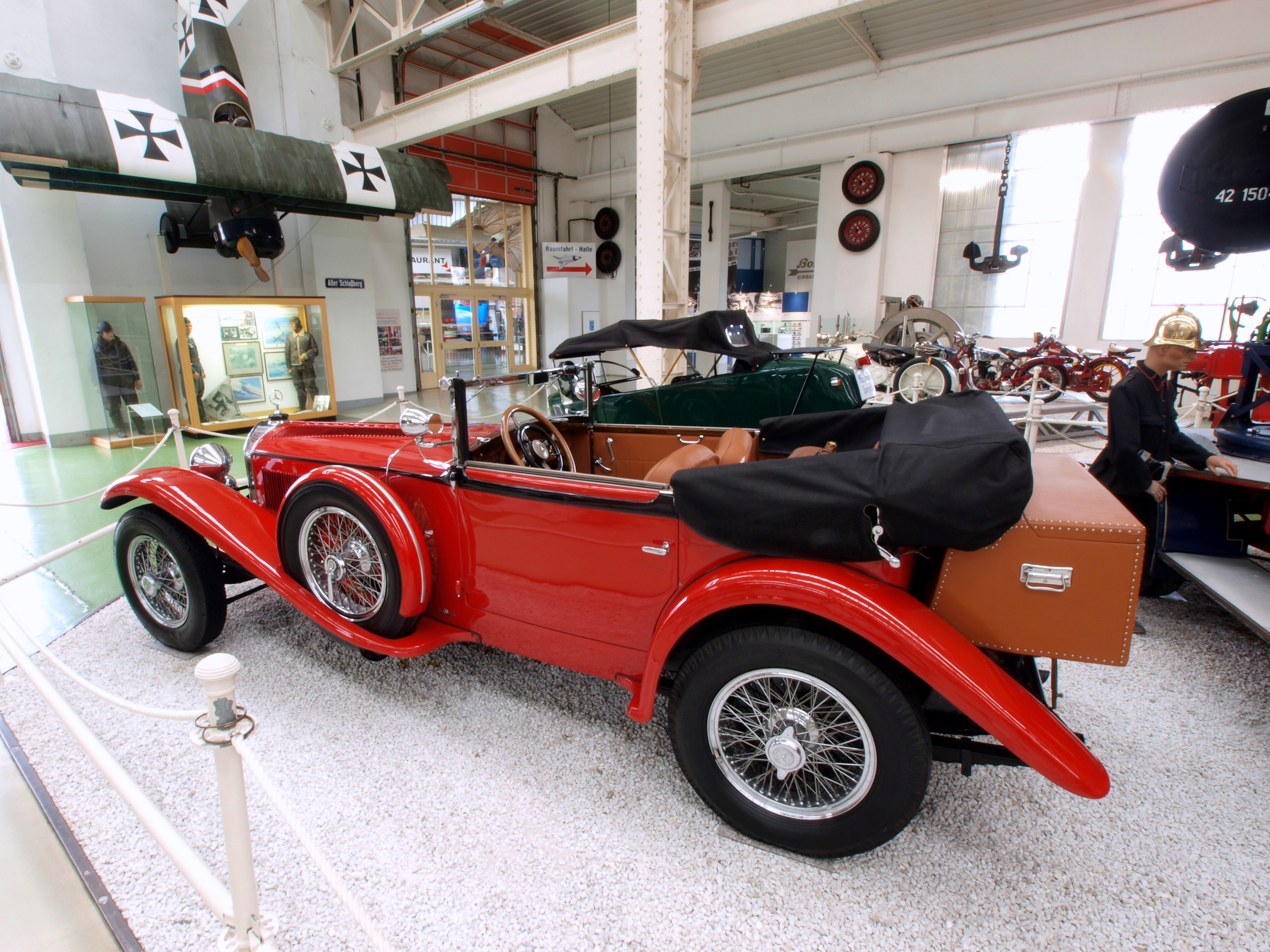
1928 Mercedes Benz 630 Kompressor

== Replacement ==
The replacement for the “Limousine” (sedan/saloon) bodied Mercedes-Benz Typ 630 was the even larger and more powerful Mercedes-Benz Typ 770 (W07). The sports car bodied cars were replaced by the ferociously fast Mercedes-Benz SS and SSK (Typ 06) which had commenced production, albeit in very small numbers, in 1928.

== Sources and further reading ==
- Oswald, Werner: Mercedes-Benz Personenwagen 1886–1986, Motorbuch-Verlag Stuttgart 1987, ISBN 3613011336
- Oswald, Werner (2001). Deutsche Autos 1920-1945, Band (vol) 2 (in German). Motorbuch Verlag. ISBN 3-613-02170-6.

This entry incorporates information from the equivalent German Wikipedia entry.
