= Mercedes-Benz 770 =

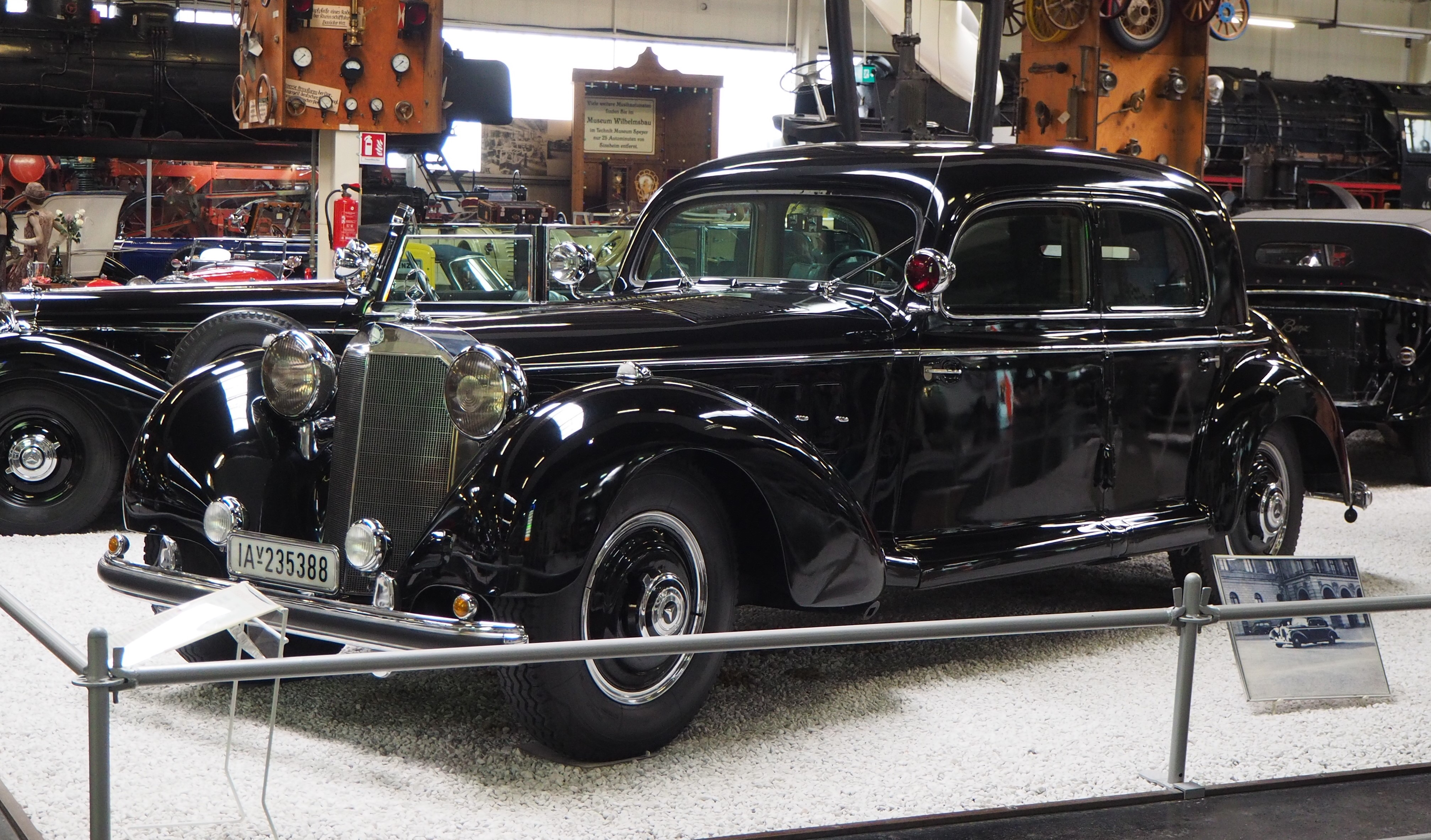
- 1943 Mercedes-Benz 770 (W150)

Overview
- Manufacturer: Mercedes-Benz
- Also called: Mercedes-Benz W07/W150; Großer
- Production: 1930–1944; 205 produced
- Assembly: Germany: Untertürkheim

Body and chassis
- Class: Ultra-luxury car Limousine
- Body style: 4-door, 6-seat Pullman (limousine); Touring car (6 seats); Cabriolet
- Layout: FR layout

Powertrain
- Engine: 7,665 cc M07 I8 (1930–1938); 7,665 cc M150 I8 (1938–1944)

Dimensions
- Wheelbase: W07 (1930–1938): 3,750 mm (148 in); W150 (1938–1944): 3,880 mm (153 in)
- Length: W07 (1930–1938): 5,600–5,700 mm (220–220 in); W150 (1938–1944): 6,000–6,200–6,500 mm (240–240–260 in)
- Width: W07 (1930–1938): 1,850 mm (73 in); W150 (1938–1944): 2,100–2,200–2,500 mm (83–87–98 in)
- Height: W07 (1930–1938): 1,800–1,830 mm (71–72 in); W150 (1938–1944): 1,900 mm (75 in)

Chronology
- Predecessor: Mercedes-Benz 630
- Successor: Mercedes-Benz 600

The Mercedes-Benz 770, also known as the Großer Mercedes (German for "Large Mercedes"), was an ultra luxury car built by Mercedes-Benz from 1930 until 1944. The second model (W150) is best known from its use by high-ranking officials of Nazi Germany and their allies before and during World War II, including Adolf Hitler, Hermann Göring, Heinrich Himmler, Reinhard Heydrich, Ion Antonescu, Gustaf Mannerheim, and Benito Mussolini, many of which were captured in archival footage.

== Series I: W07 (1930–1938) ==
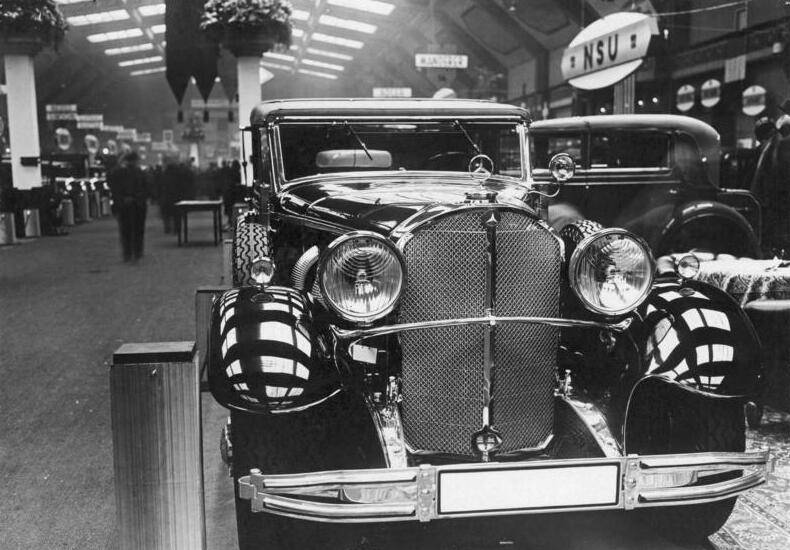
Mercedes Benz 770 (W07) on display at the 1931 Berlin Motor Show

The 770 was introduced in 1930 as the successor to the Mercedes-Benz Typ 630, with the internal code W07. These high-priced cars were mainly used by governments as state vehicles. Reich President Paul von Hindenburg, Emperor Hirohito and Pope Pius XI were among the customers, and Adolf Hitler used a 770 from 1931 onwards. 117 W07-series cars were built until 1938.

The W07 version of the 770 was powered by an inline eight-cylinder engine of 7,665 cc (467.7 cu in) capacity with an overhead camshaft and aluminium pistons. This engine produced 150 bhp (112 kW) at 2800 rpm without supercharging. An optional Roots type supercharger, which was engaged at full throttle, would raise the output to 200 bhp (149 kW) at 2800 rpm, which could propel the car to 160 km/h (99 mph). The transmission had four forward ratios, of which third was direct and fourth was an overdrive.

The W07 had a contemporary boxed chassis suspended by semi-elliptic leaf springs onto beam axles front and rear. Dimensions would vary with coachwork, but the chassis had a wheelbase of 3,750 mm (147.6 in) and a front track equal to the rear track of 1,500 mm (59.1 in).

== Series II: W150 (1938–1944) ==
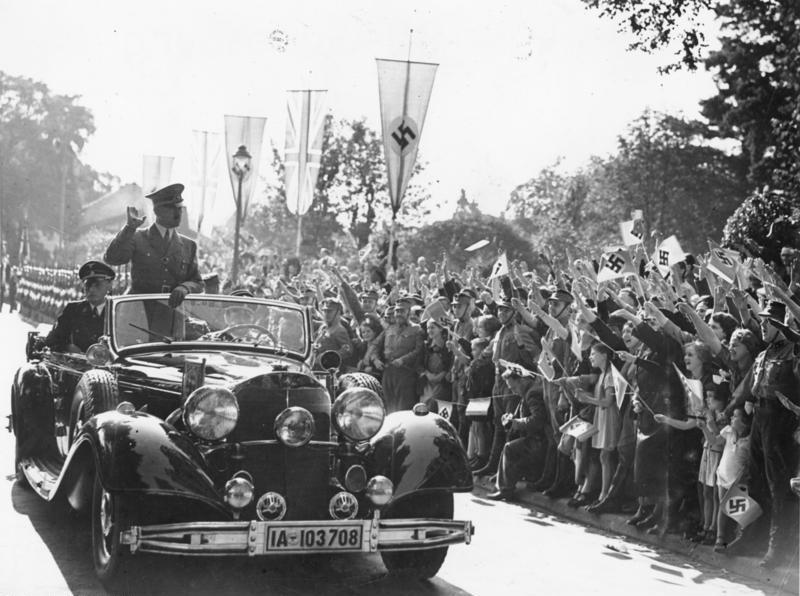
Adolf Hitler in a W150 cabriolet in Bad Godesberg, 1938

The 770 was substantially revised in 1938, resulting in the new internal designation of W150. The new chassis was made with oval section tubes and was suspended from coil springs all around, with independent suspension at front and a de Dion axle at the rear. Hydraulic brakes were fitted, compared to the servo-assisted mechanical brakes of the prior series.

The engine had the same basic architecture as that of the W07, but had been tuned to produce 155 bhp (116 kW) at 3000 rpm without supercharging and 230 bhp (172 kW) at 3200 rpm with. The transmission now had five forward ratios with a direct fourth gear and an overdrive fifth. Top speed was around 170 km/h (106 mph). A twin-supercharged 400 hp (298 kW) model was available, able to reach a top speed of around 190 km/h (118 mph). A total of five were made.

In 1938, the huge W150 was understood to have been the most expensive German passenger car for sale up to that time, though it appeared on no price list: the price was published merely as auf Anfrage ("upon request"). Eighty-eight W150-series cars were built before chassis production ended in 1944. The last cars were bodied and delivered in March 1944.

Some cars of this model were offered by Hitler as gifts to his allies, namely: Marshal Ion Antonescu of Romania, Benito Mussolini of Italy, Francisco Franco of Spain, Marshal Carl Gustaf Emil Mannerheim of Finland and Emil Hácha of the Bohemian Protectorate. Marshal Antonescu's car, for instance, was bulletproof.

== Surviving 770s ==
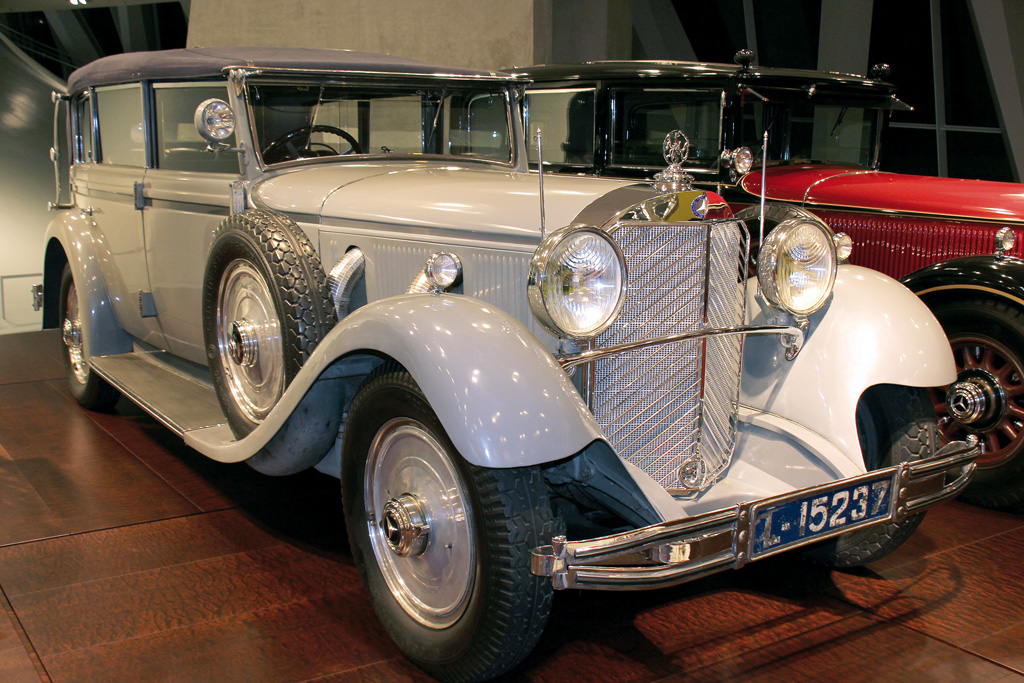
1932 Mercedes-Benz 770 (W07) "Grosser" cabriolet formerly owned by ex-emperor Wilhelm II

The Canadian War Museum in Ottawa has on display one of the seven cars used by Hitler. Heavily modified with extensive armour plating – including 40 mm (1.6 in) glass all round, and 18 mm (0.71 in) steel armour plate in all metalwork surrounding the main passenger compartment, plus an additional raisable plate between driver and rear passenger compartment – it weighs 4,100 kg. This special version with the internal designation W 150 II, built from 1940 to 1943, was also equipped with 480 mm (19 in) armoured steel wheels and bullet-resistant 20-chamber tyres. The fenders were made of light metal to reduce weight; for reasons of tyre durability, the manufacturer recommended a maximum speed of 80 km/h (50 mph). Further modifications allowed the secure storage of three machine pistols. The body also had additional vents to the side and atop the hood, twin hinges on the side doors, and four further air vents in the main scuttle. In preparation of the fall of Berchtesgaden in April 1945, RSD and SS troops had loaded the car on a railway flat-car, where it was found in May 1945 by troops of the United States Army 20th Armored Division in Laufen. Found in a damaged condition, a liberated Dutch forced-labour mechanic got the car working, advising the troops that it was Hermann Göring's state car. Repainted in US Army green with a star applied to either side, it then served as the ranking officer's staff car during the post-war occupation period of Germany. Shipped to the U.S. in late 1945, it toured the country as part of a continued effort to raise war bonds, displayed and noted as Hermann Göring's personal car. Placed in storage, in October 1956 it was entered in a US Army surplus auction at Aberdeen Proving Ground, and sold to a Montreal-based businessman for $2,750. Shipped for restoration to Rumble Motors in Toronto, a research book was established to restore the car as Göring would have had it during the war – for a cost of CA$5,000 – apart from leaving the bullet-damaged glass in place. In 1970 as part of a tax settlement, the car was gifted to the Canadian War Museum, again displayed there as Göring's car. In 1980, museum researcher Ludwig Kosche – born in Germany – began detailed research on the car, with assistance from Mercedes-Benz, the West German embassy to Canada and the West German foreign service. Along with chassis, engine, paint and modification records, and discovery of part of its original number plate 1AV148697, it was confirmed as one of Hitler's cars, delivered to the Reich Chancellery in Berlin on 8 July 1940.

The 770K originally owned by Field Marshal of Finland Baron Gustav Mannerheim was sold to an American collector after World War II. It was featured in the 1951 motion picture The Desert Fox: The Story of Rommel as Hitler's parade car. In 1973, Mannerheim's 770K, erroneously alleged to have been the parade limousine of Adolf Hitler, was sold at auction for $153,000, which was the most money ever paid for a car at auction at that time. This broke the previous record price for an antique car, which had been $90,000 for Greta Garbo's Duesenberg in autumn 1972. It was sold to a businessman from Lancaster, Pennsylvania, who wanted the car for a park called Dutch Wonderland. Since 1984, Mannerheim's car has been privately owned.

Another 770 was sold at the same 1973 auction, for $93,000. The high bidder was an Alabama developer and campaign manager for George Wallace's campaign in the 1964 U.S. presidential election. However, he could not secure financing to complete the transaction and subsequently sold his option to a mobile-home manufacturer, Don Tidwell.

As of November 2009, one of Hitler's 770Ks was allegedly purchased for several million euros by an unnamed Russian billionaire.

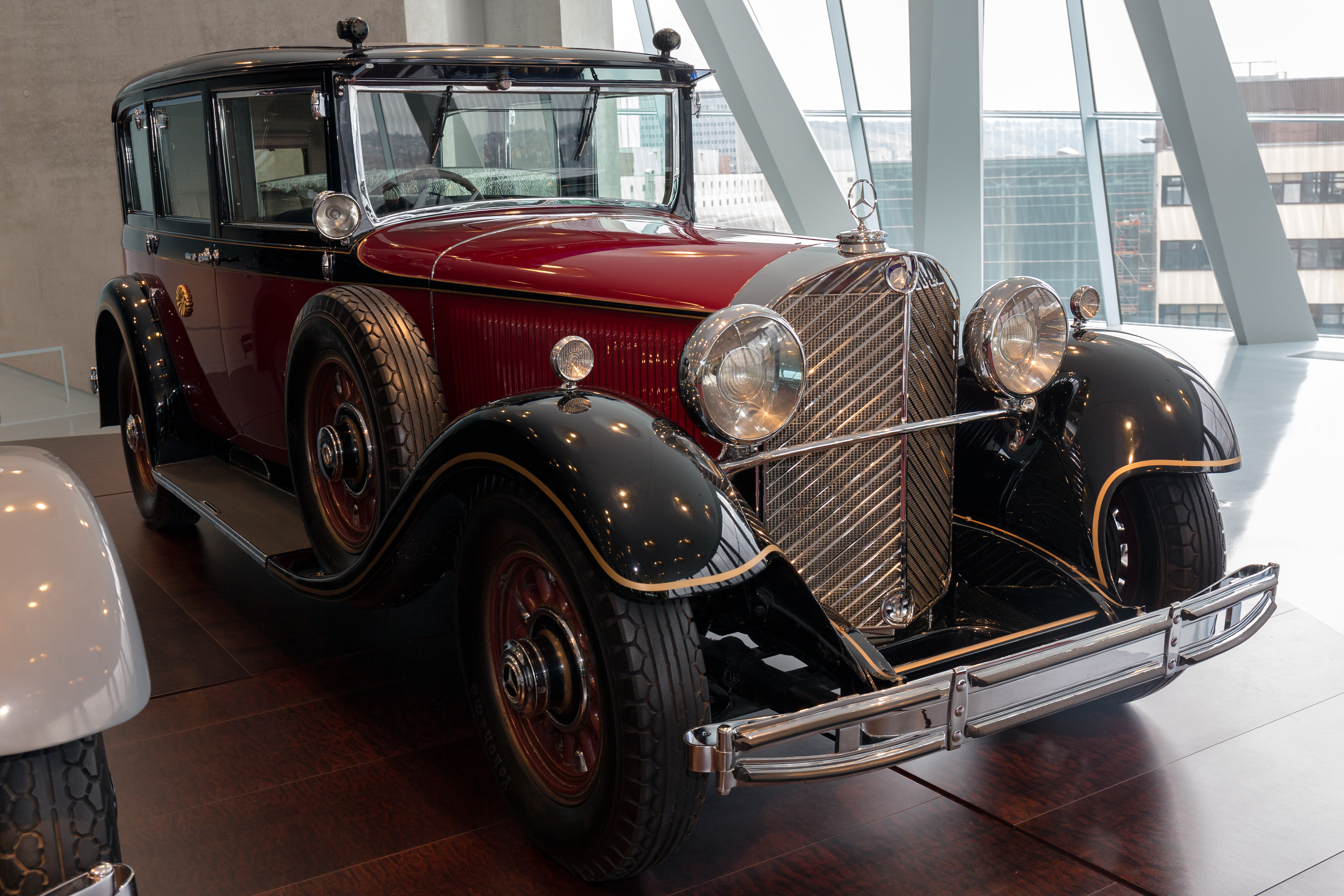
1935 Mercedes-Benz 770 (W07) limousine used by Emperor Hirohito

Japanese Emperor Hirohito owned at least 7 versions of the 770K built between 1930 and 1938, including one cabriolet parade car. An armoured Grand Pullman limousine delivered in January 1935 is now on display at the Mercedes-Benz Museum in Stuttgart.

In the Norwegian Mercedes-Benz Club's magazine of June 2010 is an article on a 770 Offener Tourenwagen (W150). It was brought to Norway in 1941 by General Nikolaus von Falkenhorst. After World War II, it was used by the King of Norway. It was later sold to a buyer in the United States. The car won the prize for the best unrestored pre-war car at the Pebble Beach Concours d'Elegance in 2003.

Two other 770s were brought to Norway during the war, one for Josef Terboven and the other for Vidkun Quisling. The Norsk Motorveteran magazine had a short article on one of the cars, which stated that it was displayed for sale to the public but apparently no one wanted to buy it despite the low price of KR 50,-. It was eventually scrapped, and all that now remains of the car is part of the bullet-resistant glasswork.

Another car, a 1939 cabriolet, made its way to Czechoslovakia where it was used as a VIP transport for the government. In 1948 the communists took over and in 1952 it was sent to the Karosa body works and given a new body and interior, so nothing would resemble its "imperialist" origin. This car is on display at the National Technical Museum in Prague.

There is a 1938 Mercedes-Benz 770 Großer at the Museu do Caramulo in Portugal. This car is armoured and was ordered by the PVDE, the Portuguese internal secret police, after the 1937 bomb attempt against the Portuguese dictator António Salazar.

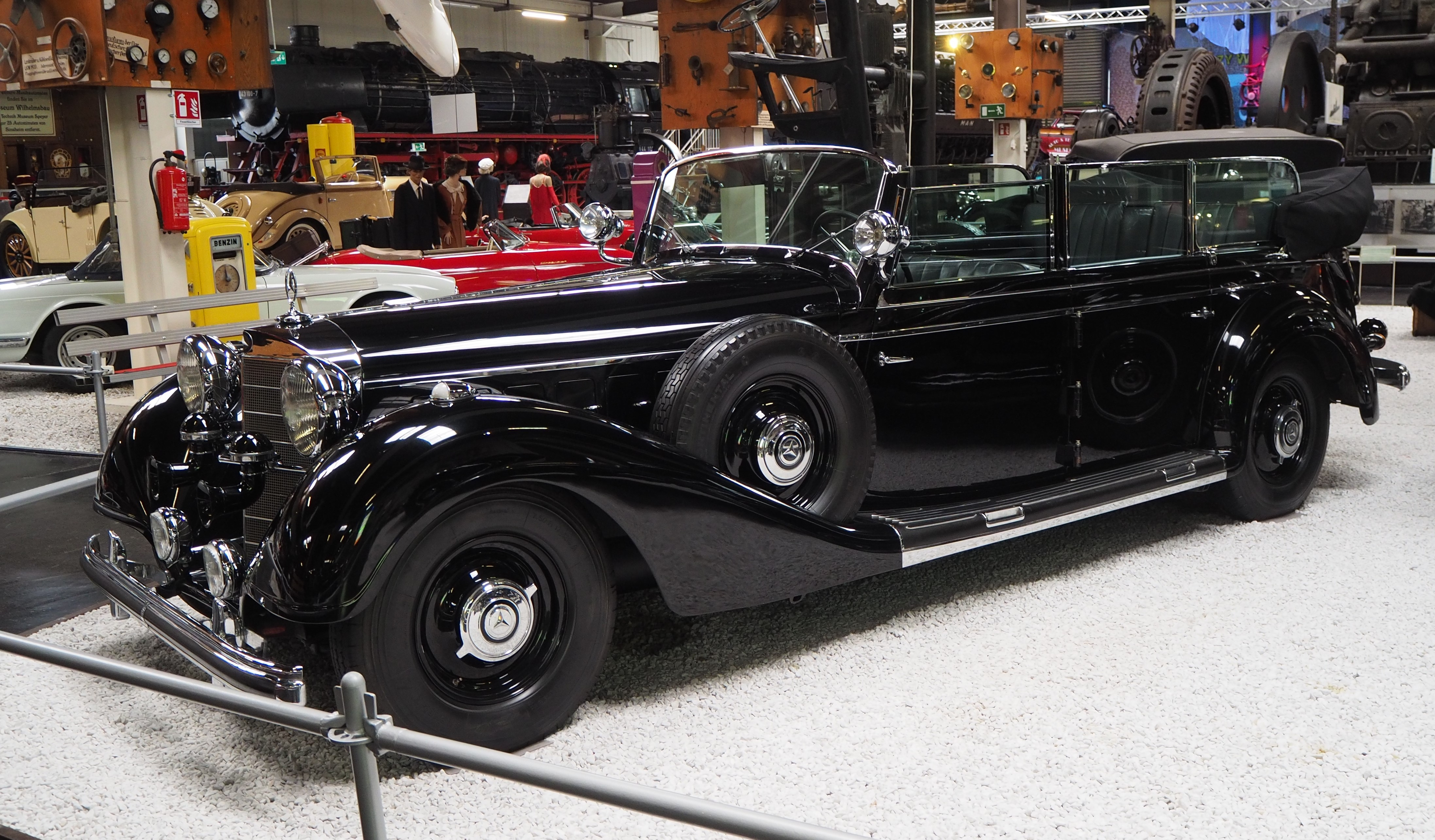
1938 Mercedes-Benz 770K (W150) used by Hitler, in the Auto und Technik Museum

A black 1938 770K, on display at the Technisches Museum in Sinsheim, Germany, was supposedly owned by the German central government office and used by Adolf Hitler during parades. The car was fitted with mine-resistant floor armour, plus thick glass and bodywork. However, as a convertible parade car, the occupants' protection was limited.

There is a 1939 770K on display at the Southward Car Museum at Paraparaumu in New Zealand. It is believed to have been intended as a gift for Edward VIII after the planned German invasion of Britain.

A 1939 770K Cabriolet B has made at least one appearance at the Pebble Beach Concours d'Elegance in California. This car is a 2-door, 5-passenger convertible, making it particularly unusual since the majority of W150 cars were built as hardtop limousines or convertible limousines. It is finished in dark red with a tan leather interior.

The Spanish Royal Guard has a 770 in the Royal Palace of El Pardo in Madrid, which was used by Francisco Franco.

A 770K once owned by King Abdullah I of Jordan is on display in the Royal Automobile Museum there.

A 770K Tourenwagen is on display at the Henri-Malartre automobile museum in Rochetaillée-sur-Saône, France. It was seized in May 1945 in Berchtesgaden by troops from General Leclerc's 2nd Armored Division. The windows are scratched from gunfire by soldiers who wanted to test its armor. Before being installed in the museum in 1969, the car had traveled for ten years in France, Belgium, and Holland to raise funds for war widows and orphans.

== Gallery ==
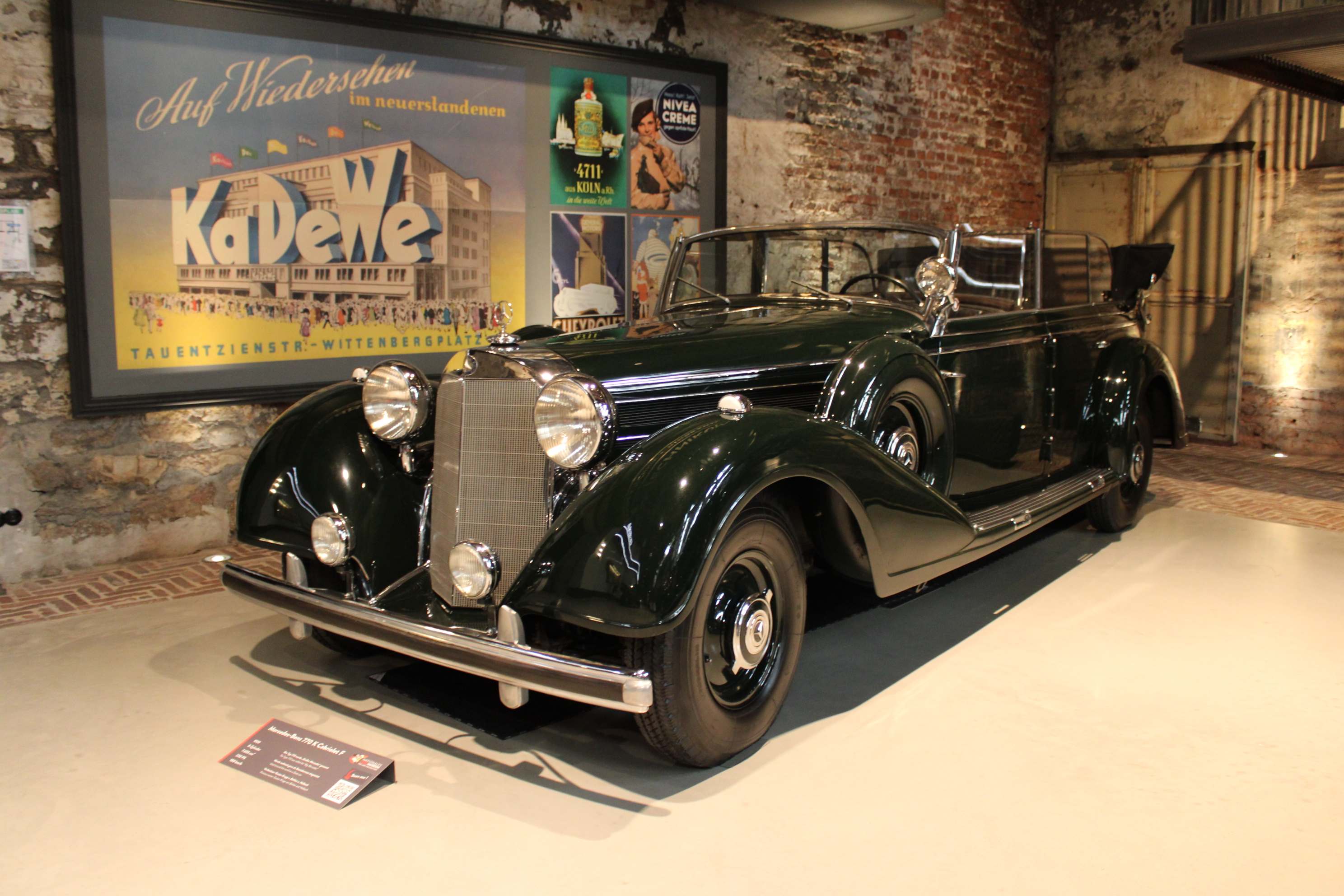
Mercedes-Benz W150 Cabriolet F

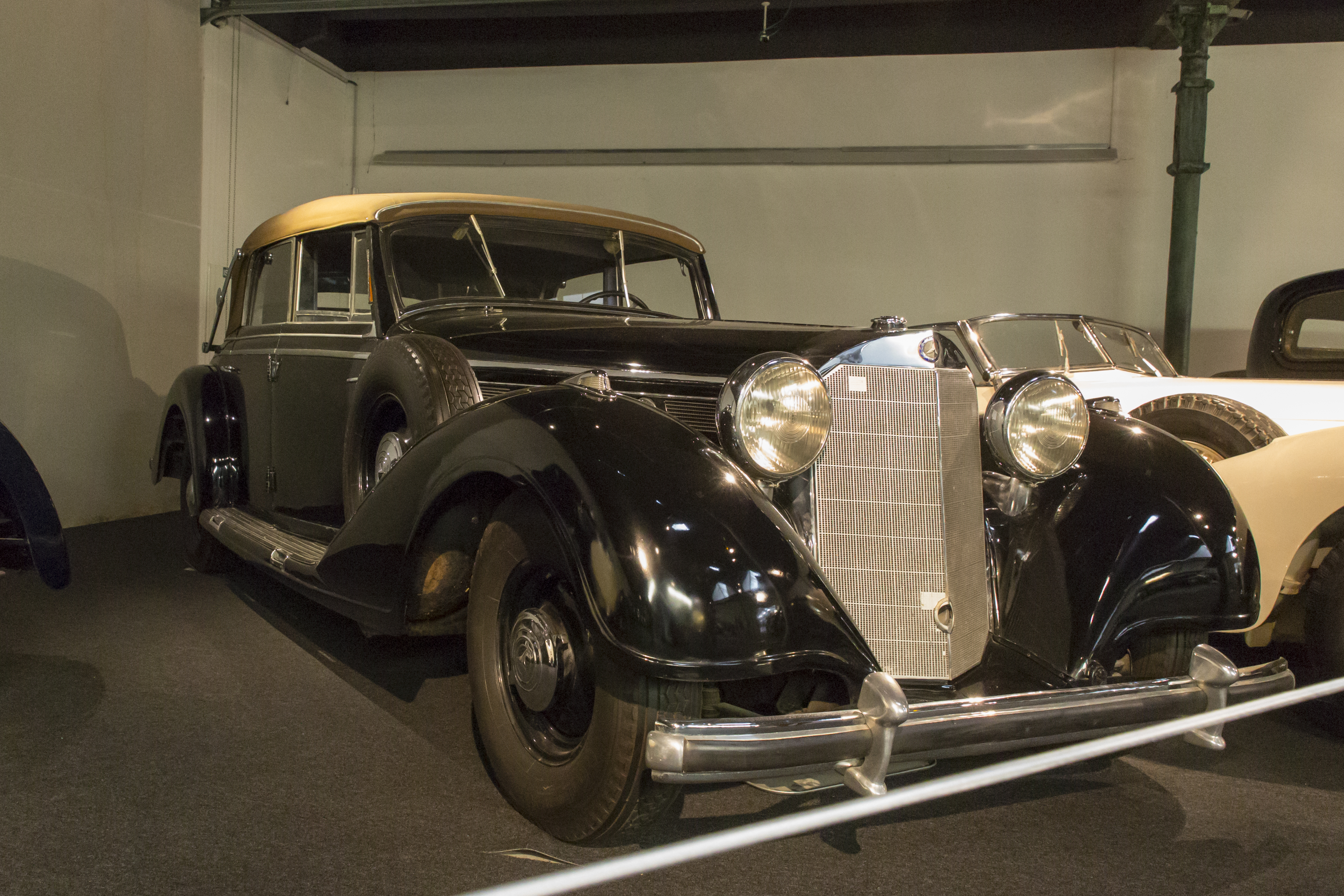
Mercedes 770 cabriolet

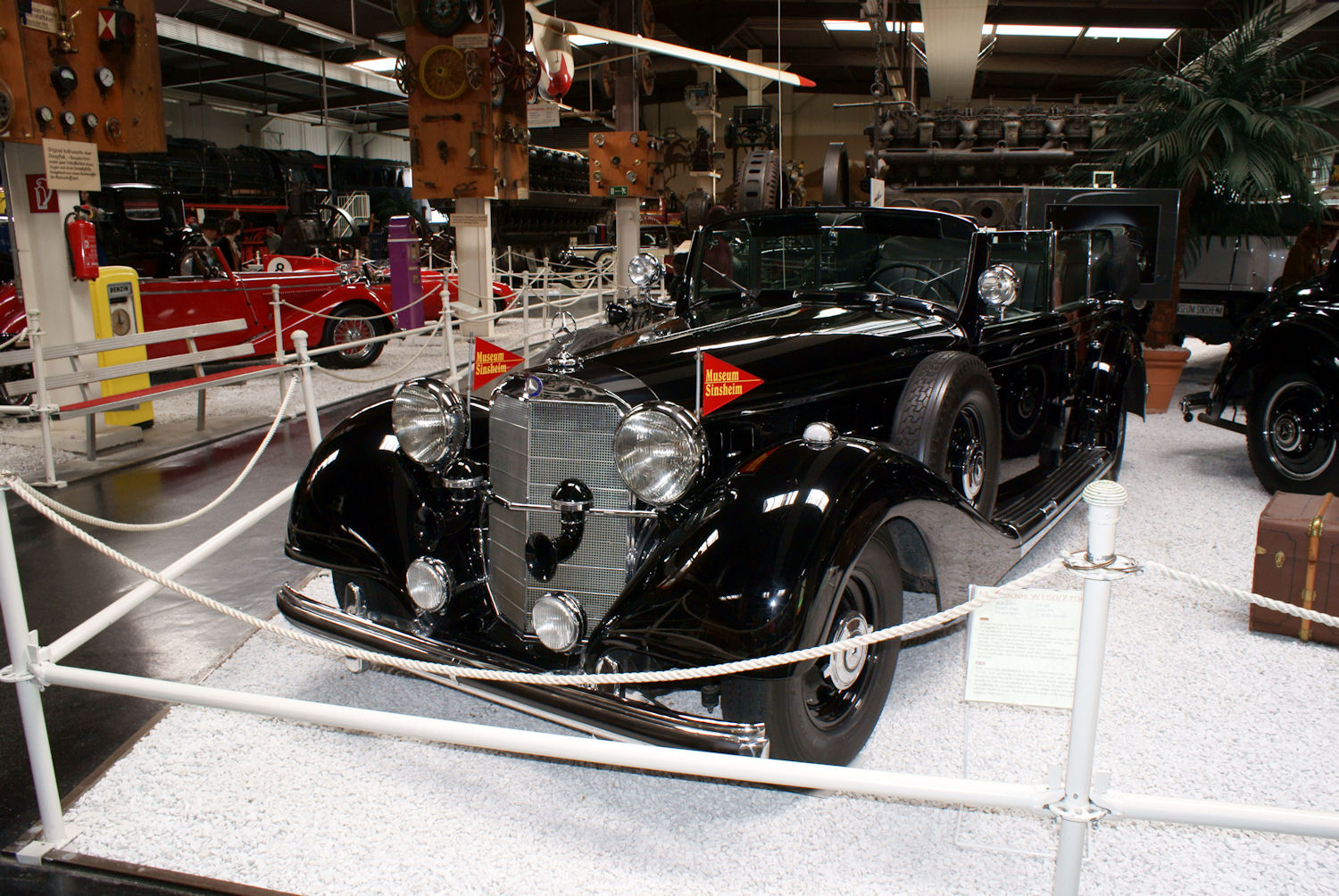
Mercedes-Benz 770K of Adolf Hitler

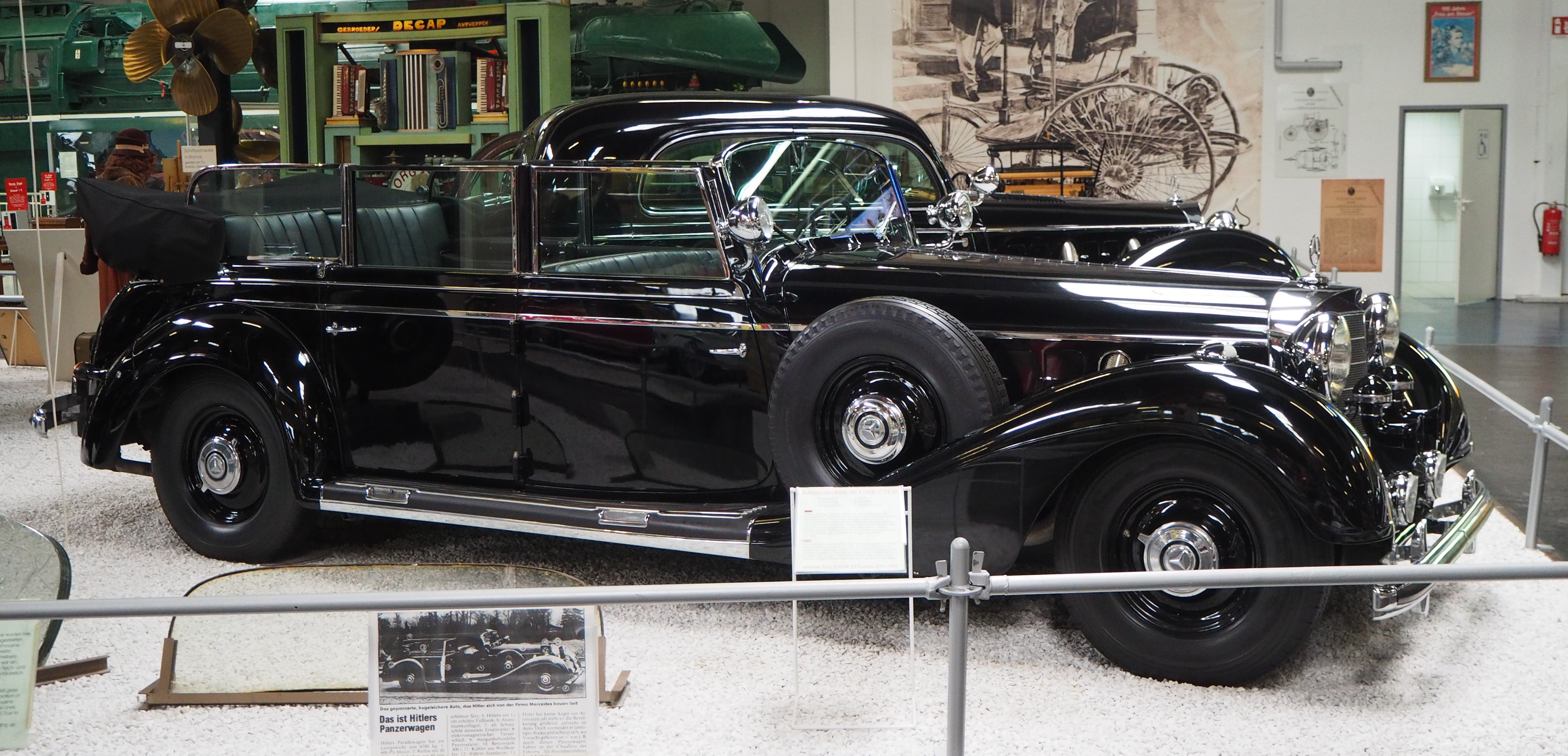
Mercedes-Benz 770K of Adolf Hitler

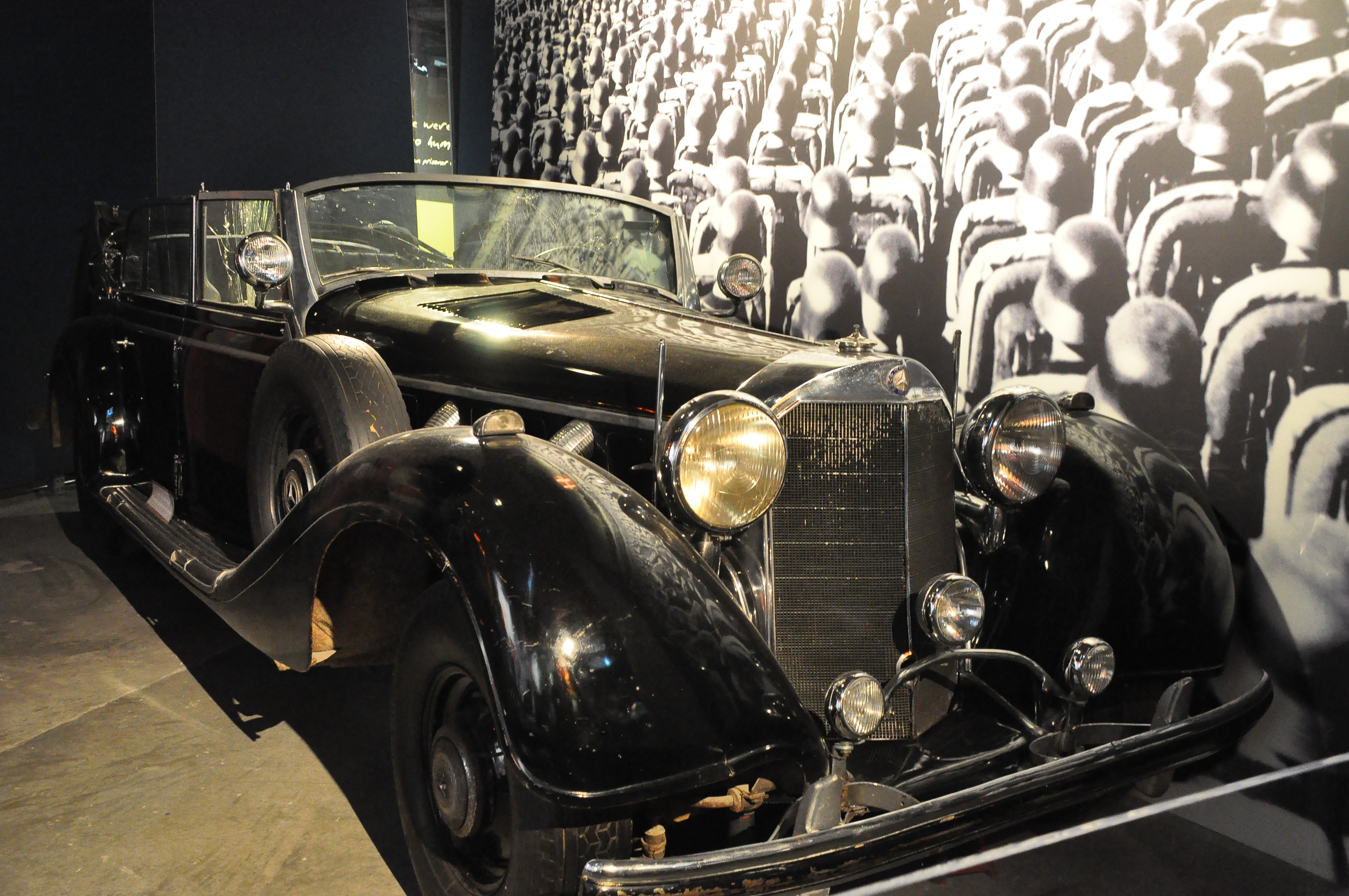
Mercedes-Benz 770K of Adolf Hitler

== Notable owners ==
Famous owners of the Mercedes-Benz 770 have included the following people, most of them part of the Axis powers during World War II.

=== Politicians and royalty ===
- Abdullah I of Jordan
- Adolf Hitler
- António Salazar
- Benito Mussolini
- Carl Gustaf Emil Mannerheim
- Emil Hácha
- Faisal I of Iraq (later used by Ghazi and Faisal II)
- Francisco Franco
- Haakon VII of Norway
- Hermann Göring
- Heinrich Himmler
- Hirohito
- Ion Antonescu
- Josef Terboven
- Óscar Carmona
- Paul von Hindenburg
- Pope Pius XI
- Reinhard Heydrich
- Vidkun Quisling
- Wilhelm II

=== Other notable people ===
- Clive Palmer (as a modern owner)
- Erik Charell

== See also ==
- Mercedes-Benz W31
- List of Mercedes-Benz cars
