= Bentley 4½ Litre =

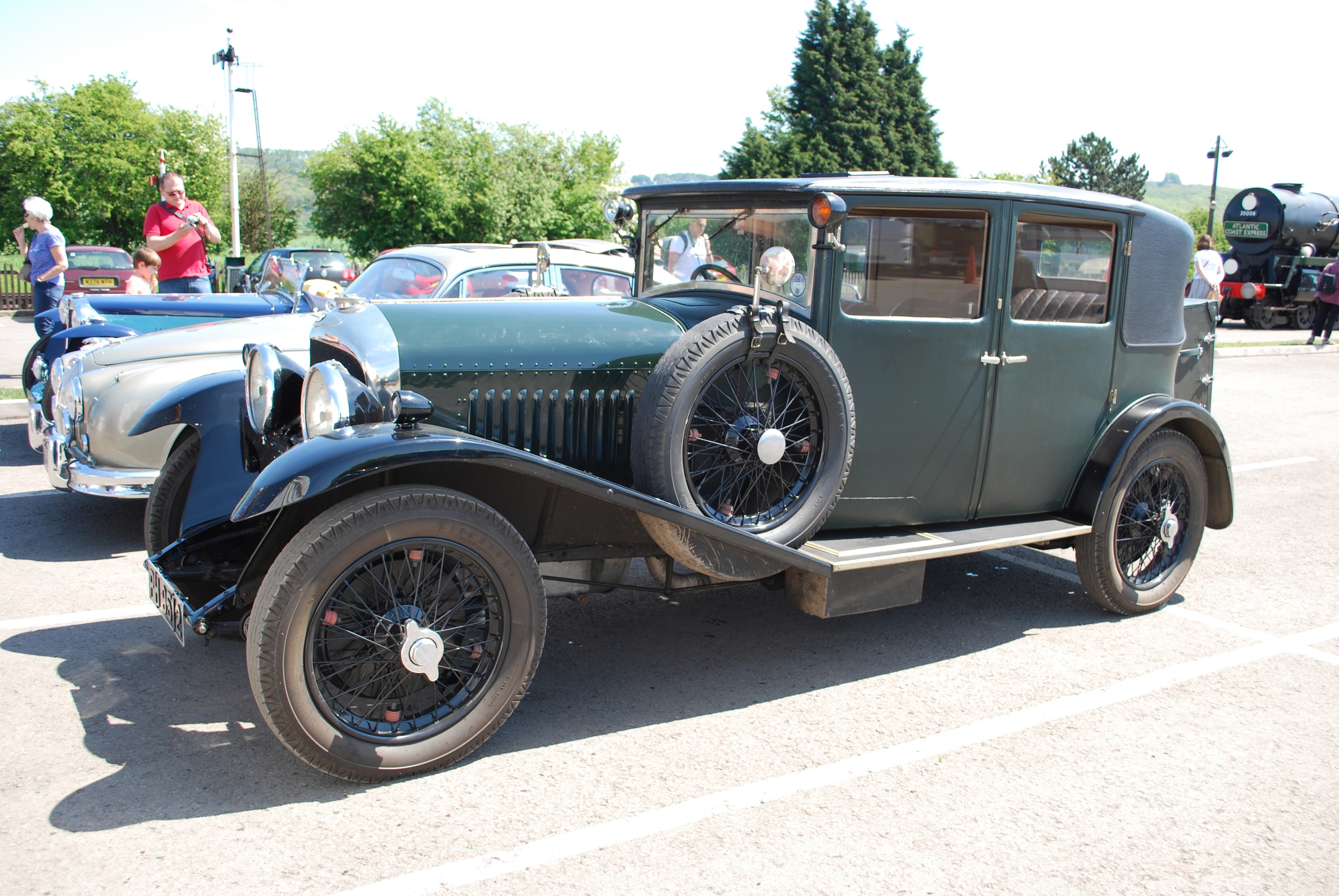
- Gurney Nutting saloon 1928; Chassis MF3155, Engine MF3155, Reg PH 9512; Weymann body all original with Brooks trunk

Overview
- Manufacturer: Bentley Motors Limited
- Production: 1927–1931; (supercharged model from 1929); (720 units); 2019–2020; (12 units)
- Assembly: United Kingdom: Cricklewood
- Designer: Walter Owen Bentley

Body and chassis
- Class: Sports car chassis
- Body style: as arranged with coachbuilder by customer
- Layout: FR layout
- Related: Blower Bentley (supercharged model)

Powertrain
- Engine: 4.4 L (270 cu in) SOHC I4; 4.4 L supercharged SOHC I4
- Transmission: 4-speed manual

Dimensions
- Wheelbase: Standard: 10 ft 10 in (3,300 mm); SWB (8 made): 117.5 in (2,980 mm)
- Length: 4,380 mm (172.4 in)
- Width: 1,740 mm (68.5 in)
- Kerb weight: 4½ Litre: 1,625 kg (3,583 lb); Blower: 1,727 kg (3,807 lb)

Chronology
- Predecessor: Bentley 3 Litre
- Successor: Bentley 6.5 Litre

The Bentley 4½ Litre is a British car based on a rolling chassis built by Bentley Motors. Walter Owen Bentley replaced the Bentley 3 Litre with a more powerful car by increasing its engine displacement to 4.4 litres (270 cubic inches). A racing variant was known as the Blower Bentley.

Bentley buyers used their cars for personal transport and arranged for their new chassis to be fitted with various body styles, mostly saloons or tourers. However, the publicity brought by their competition programme was invaluable for marketing Bentley's cars.

At the time, noted car manufacturers such as Bugatti and Lorraine-Dietrich focused on designing cars to compete in the 24 Hours of Le Mans, a popular automotive endurance course established only a few years earlier. A victory in this competition quickly elevated any car maker's reputation.

A total of 720 4½ Litre cars were produced between 1927 and 1931, including 55 cars with a supercharged engine popularly known as the Blower Bentley. A 4½ Litre Bentley won the 24 Hours of Le Mans in 1928. Though the supercharged 4½ Litre Bentley's competitive performance was not outstanding, it set several speed records, most famously the Bentley Blower No.1 Monoposto in 1932 at Brooklands with a recorded speed of 222.03 km/h (137.96 mph).

== Background and development ==
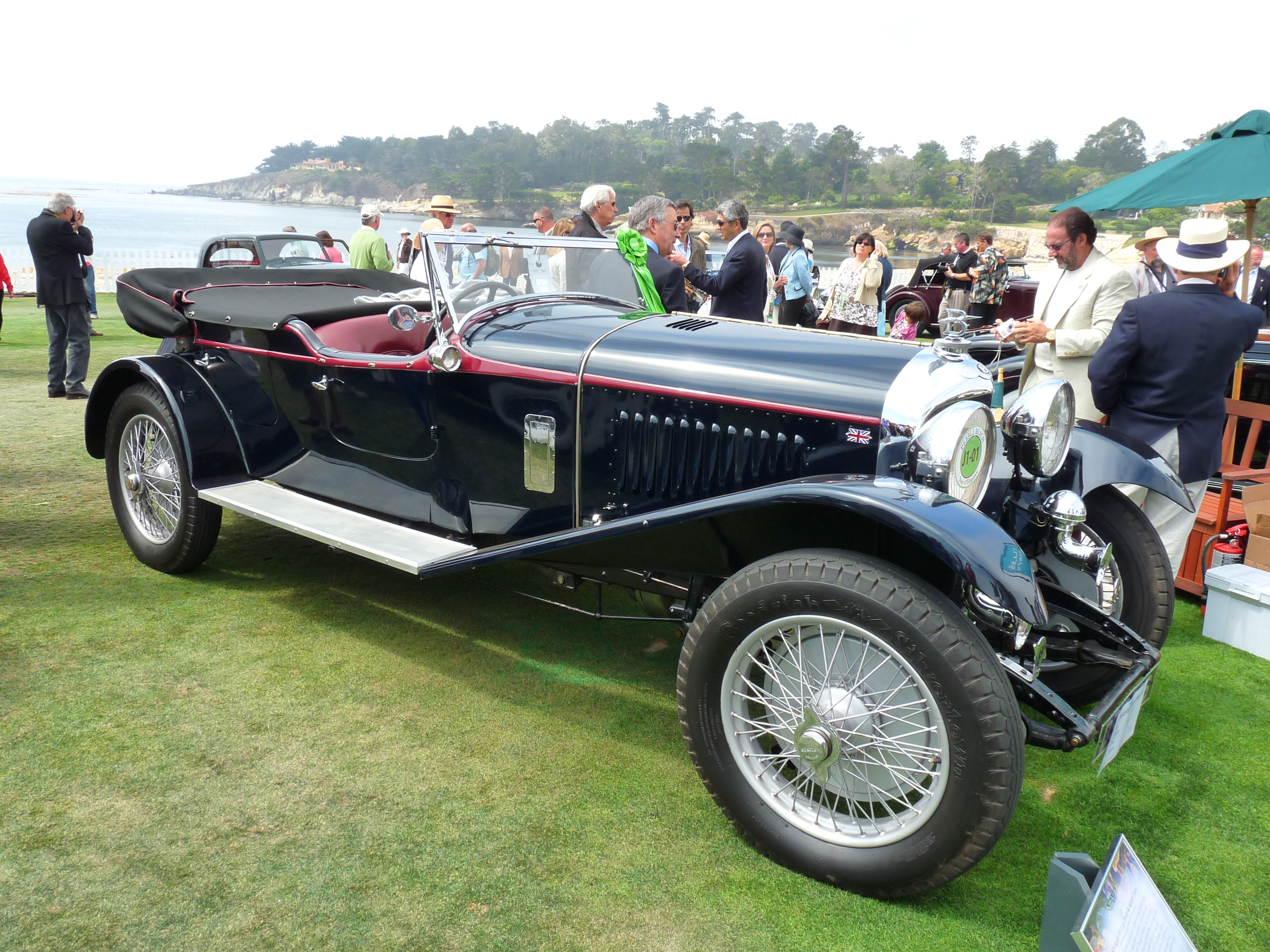
1929 4½ Litre with original Thrupp & Maberly four seat coachwork

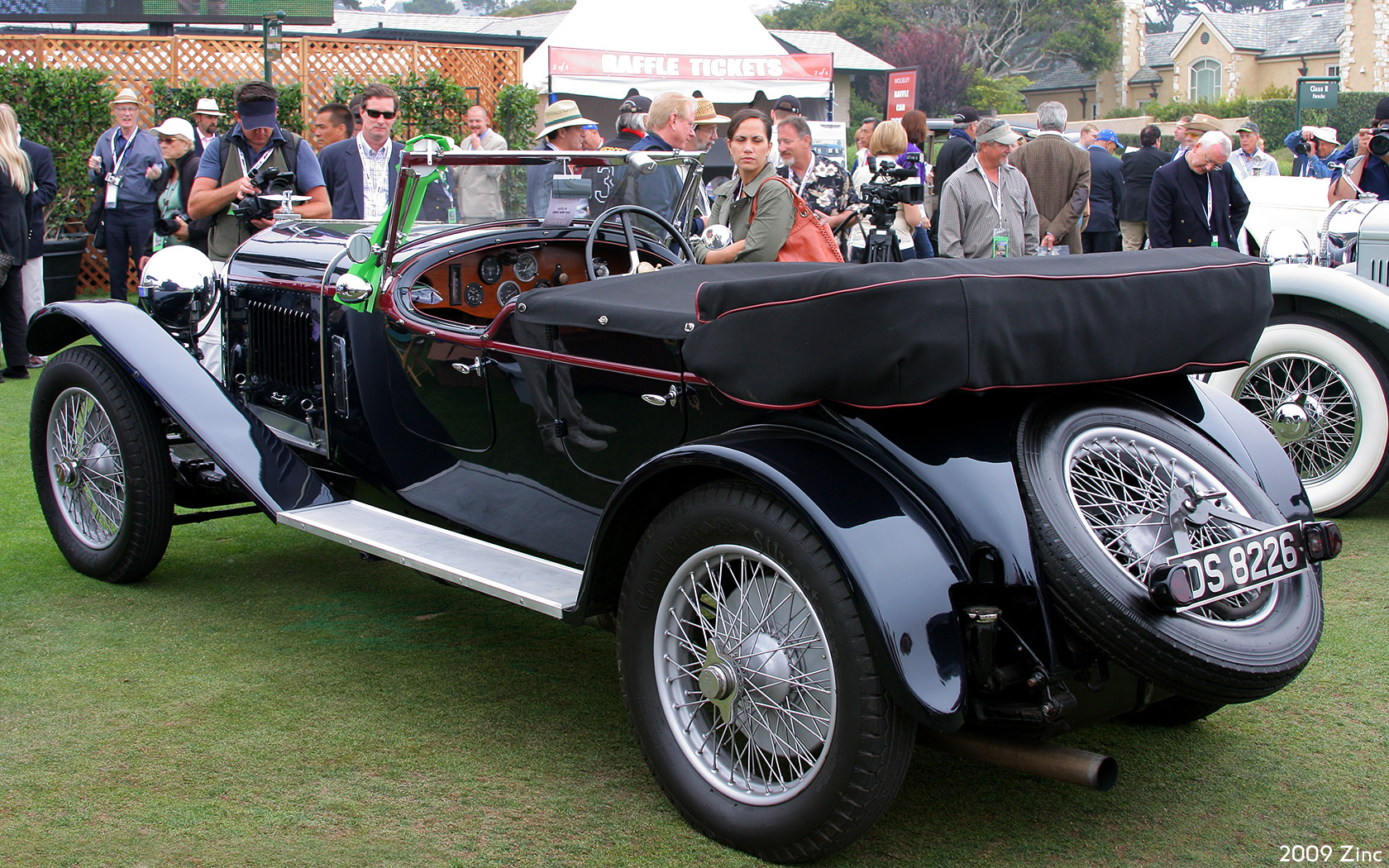
Very few vintage Bentleys have survived with their four-seater coachwork intact

=== Bentley at the 24 Hours of Le Mans ===
The 24 Hours of Le Mans endurance race is a 24-hour race around the Circuit de la Sarthe. The inaugural race was held 26–27 May 1923, and attracted many drivers, mostly French. There were two foreign competitors in the first race, Frank Clement and Canadian John Duff, the latter winning the 1924 competition in his personal car, a Bentley 3 Litre.

"Made with precision and the finest material," and with recent success, the luxurious Bentley cars attracted attention. After two years without success, Bentley convened a group of wealthy British men, "united by their love of insouciance, elegant tailoring, and a need for speed," to renew Bentley's success. Both drivers and mechanics, these men, later nicknamed the "Bentley Boys", drove Bentley automobiles to victory in several races between 1927 and 1931, including four consecutive wins at the 24 Hours of Le Mans, and forged the brand's reputation.

It was within this context that, in 1927, Bentley developed the Bentley 4½ Litre. Two cylinders were removed from the 6½ Litre model, reducing the displacement to 4.4 litres. At the time, the 3 Litre and the 6½ Litre were already available, but the 3 Litre was an outdated, under-powered model and the 6½ Litre's image was tarnished by poor tyre performance.

=== Tim Birkin and the Blower Bentley ===
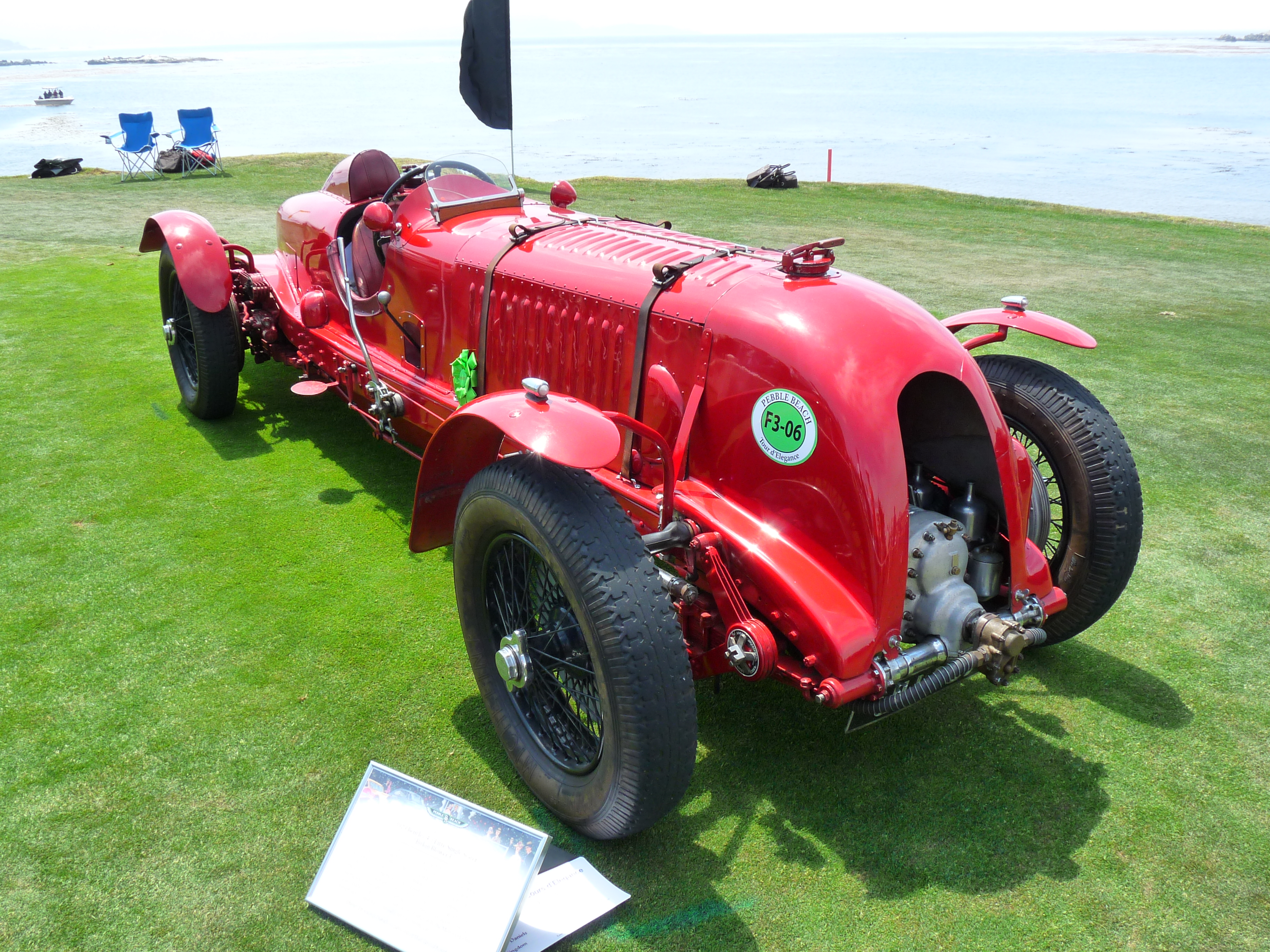
Tim Birkin's Bentley Blower No.1, shown at the 2009 Pebble Beach Concours d'Elegance

Sir Henry "Tim" Birkin, described as "the greatest British driver of his day" by W. O. Bentley, was one of the Bentley Boys. He refused to adhere strictly to Bentley's assertion that increasing displacement is always preferable to forced induction. Birkin, aided by a former Bentley mechanic, decided to produce a series of five supercharged models for the competition at the 24 Hours of Le Mans; Mercedes-Benz had been using superchargers for years.

Thus the 4½ litre Blower Bentley was born. The first supercharged Bentley had been a 3-litre FR5189 which had been supercharged at the Cricklewood factory in the winter of 1926/7. The Bentley Blower No.1 was officially presented in 1929 at the British International Motor Show at Olympia, London. The 55 copies were built to comply with 24 Hours of Le Mans regulations. Birkin arranged for the construction of the supercharged cars having received approval from Bentley chairman and majority shareholder Woolf Barnato and financing from wealthy horse racing enthusiast Dorothy Paget. Development and construction of the supercharged Bentleys was done in a workshop in Welwyn Garden City by Amherst Villiers, who also provided the superchargers.

W.O. Bentley was hostile to forced induction and believed that "to supercharge a Bentley engine was to pervert its design and corrupt its performance." However, having lost control of the company he founded to Barnato, he could not halt Birkin's project.

== Specifications ==
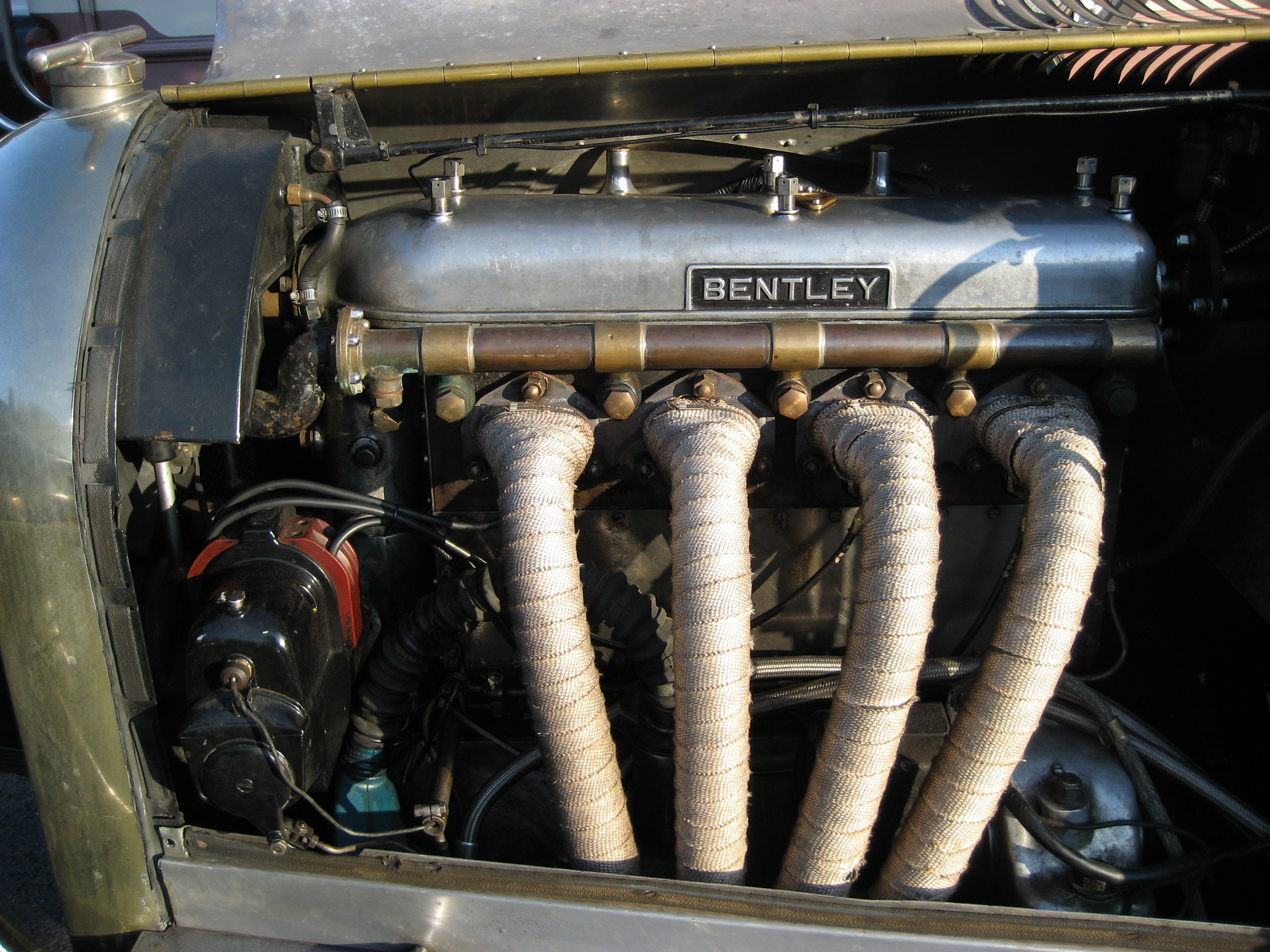
Engine near-side

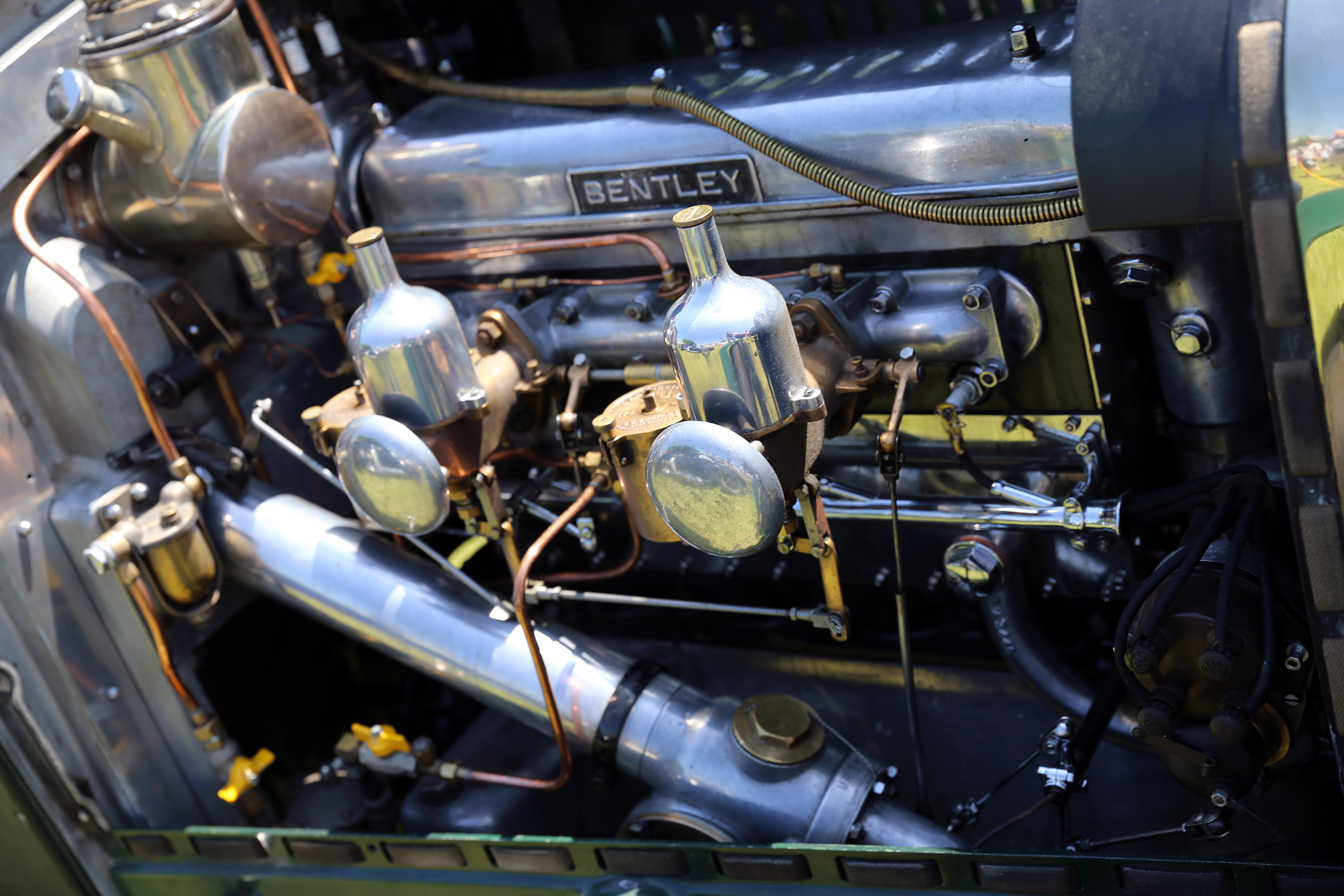
Engine off-side

Although the Bentley 4½ Litre was heavy, weighing 1,625 kg (3,583 lb), and spacious, with a length of 4,380 mm (172 in) and a wheelbase of 3,302 mm (130.0 in), it remained well-balanced and steered nimbly. The manual transmission, however, required skill, as its four gears were unsynchronised.

The robustness of the 4½ Litre's lattice chassis, made of steel and reinforced with ties, was needed to support the heavy cast iron inline-four engine.

The engine was "resolutely modern" for the time. The displacement was 4,398 cc (268.4 cu in): 100 mm (3.9 in) bore and 140 mm (5.5 in) stroke. Two SU carburetters and dual ignition with Bosch magnetos were fitted. The engine produced 110 hp (82 kW) for the touring model and 130 hp (97 kW) for the racing model. The engine speed was limited to 4,000 rpm. A single, crossflow, overhead camshaft actuated four valves per cylinder, inclined at 30 degrees. This was a technically advanced design at a time where most cars used only two valves per cylinder in a side-valve cylinder head. The camshaft was driven by bevel gears on a vertical shaft at the front of the engine, as on the 3 Litre engine.

The Bentley's tanks – radiator, oil and petrol – had quick release filler caps that opened with one stroke of a lever. This saved time during pit stops.

This 4½ was equipped with a canvas top stretched over a lightweight Weymann body. The hood structure was very light but with high wind resistance (24 Hours Le Mans rules between 1924 and 1928 dictated a certain number of laps for which the hood had to be closed). The steering wheel measured about 45 cm (18 in) in diameter and was wrapped with solid braided rope for improved grip.

Brakes were conventional, consisting of 17-inch (430 mm) drum brakes finned for improved cooling and operated by rod. Semi-elliptic leaf springs were used at front and rear.

fixed head coupé by Harrison 1928

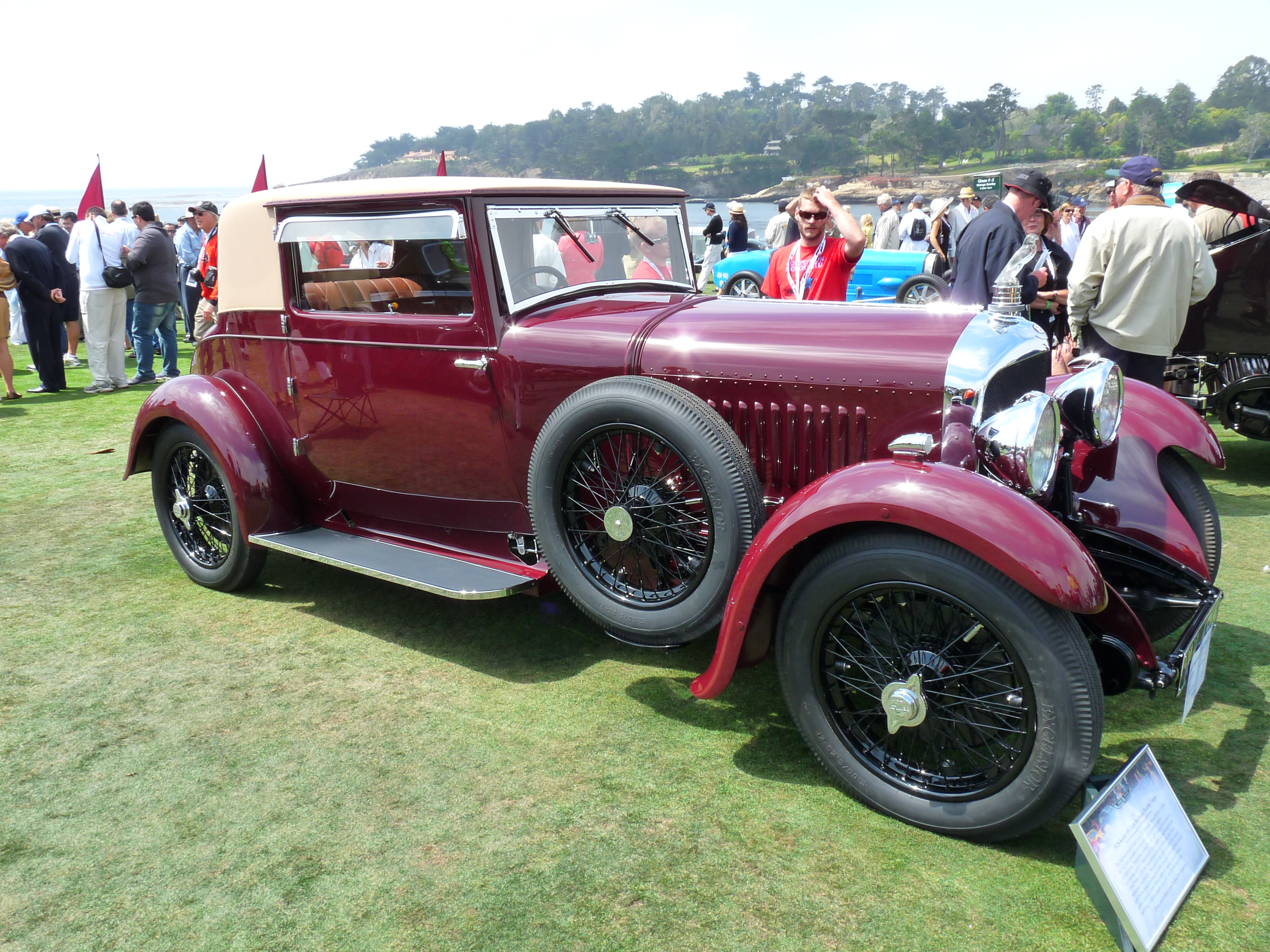

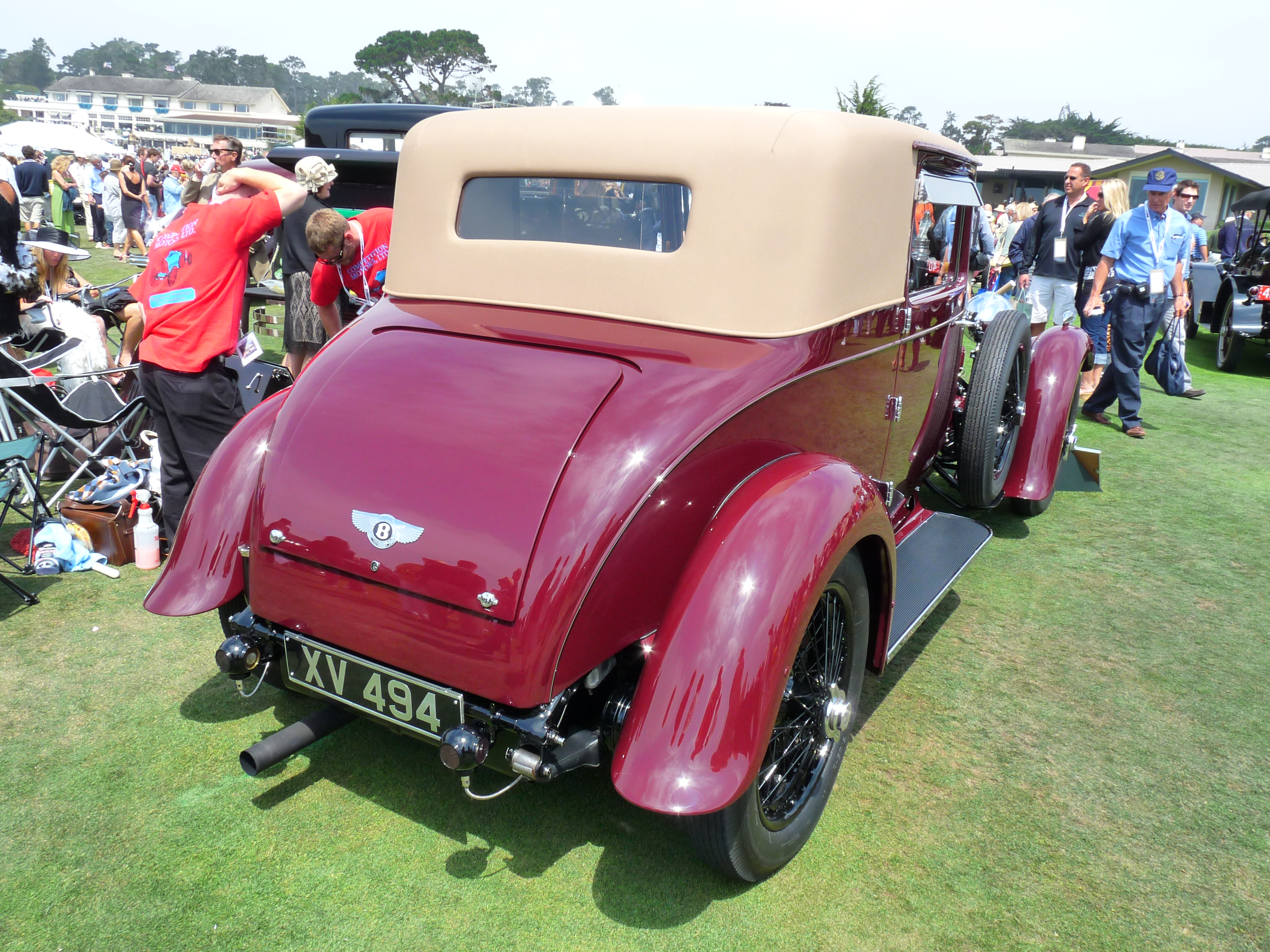

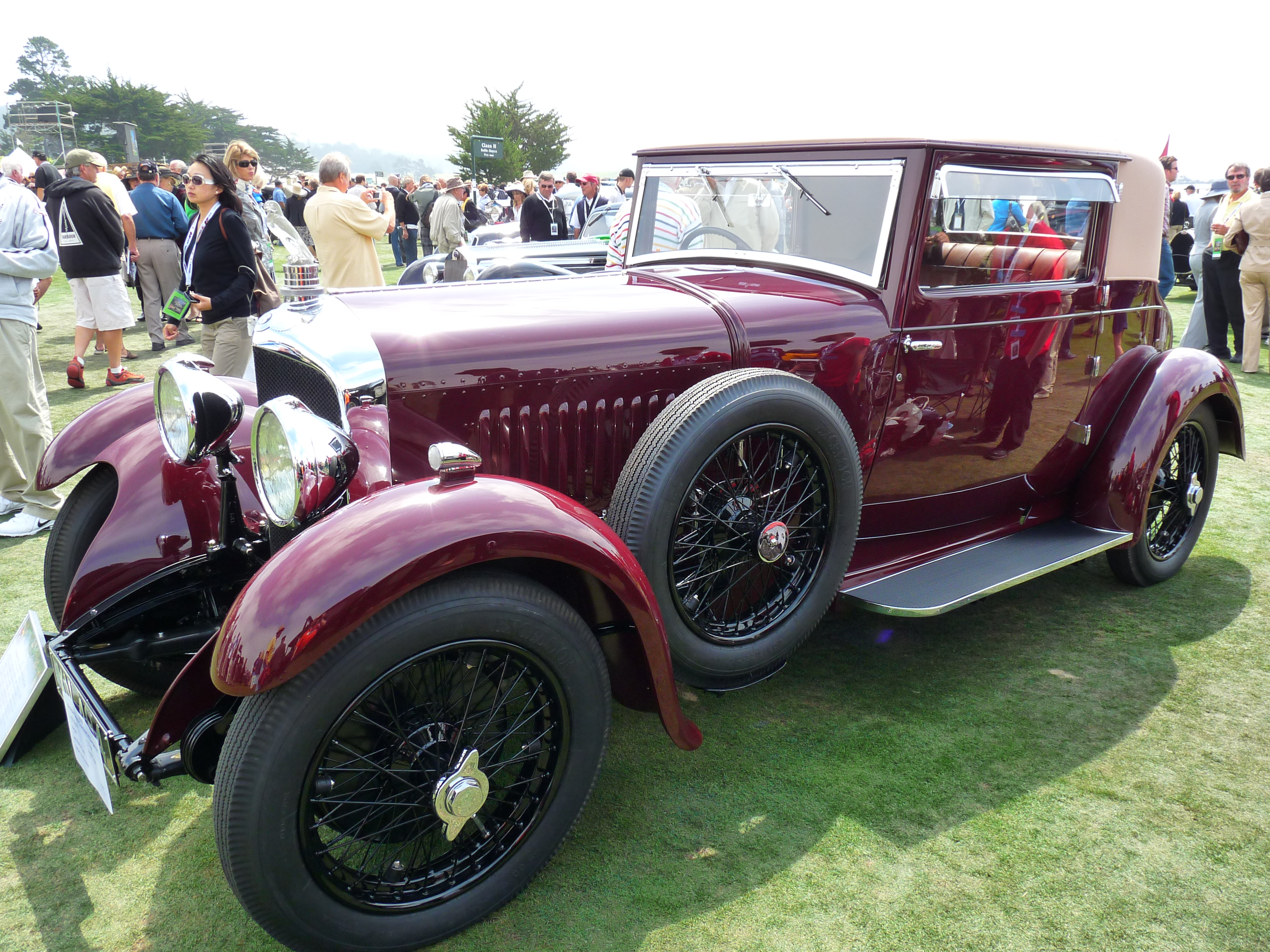

=== Blower Bentley ===
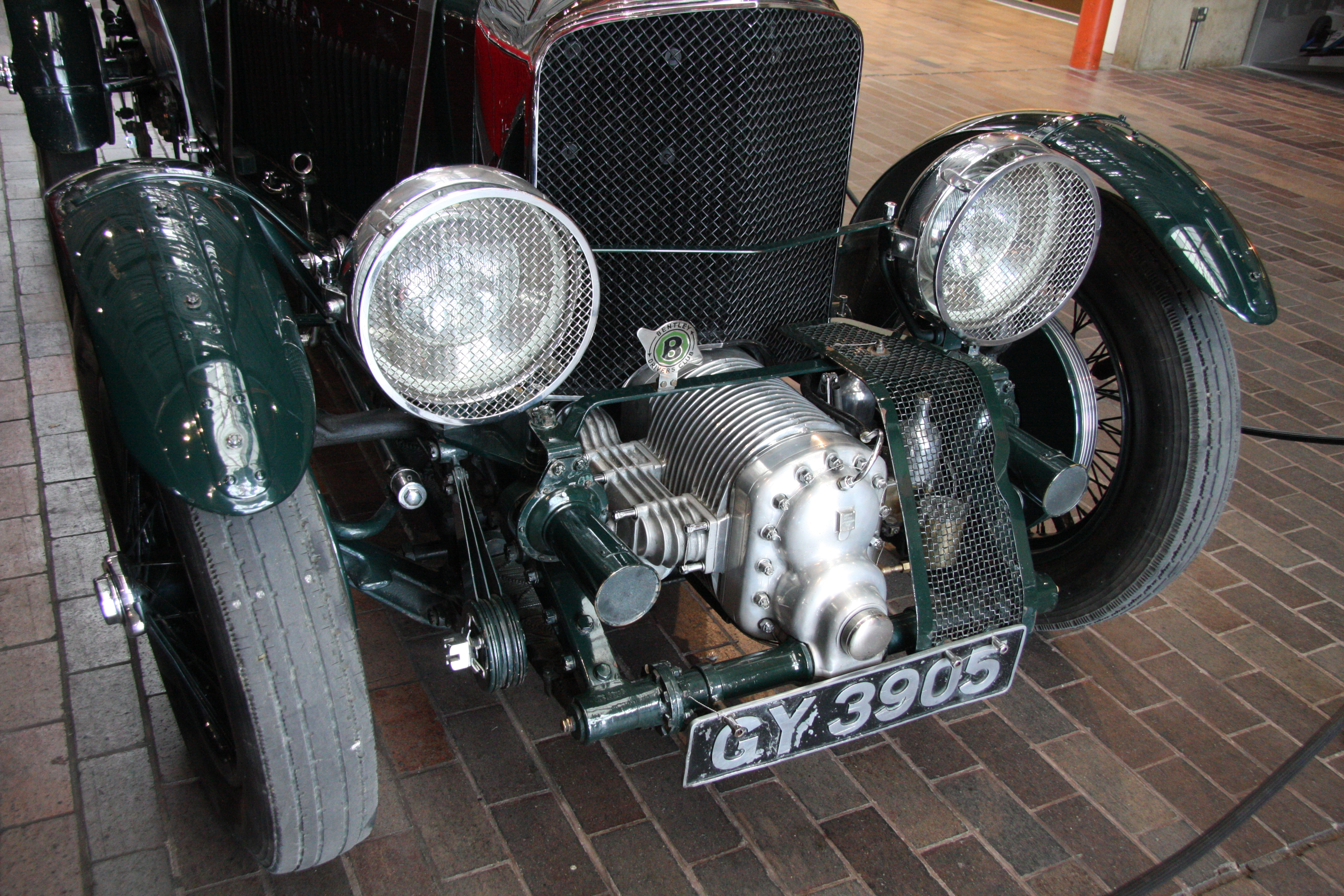
Front of a "Blower Bentley", showing the supercharger in front of the grille

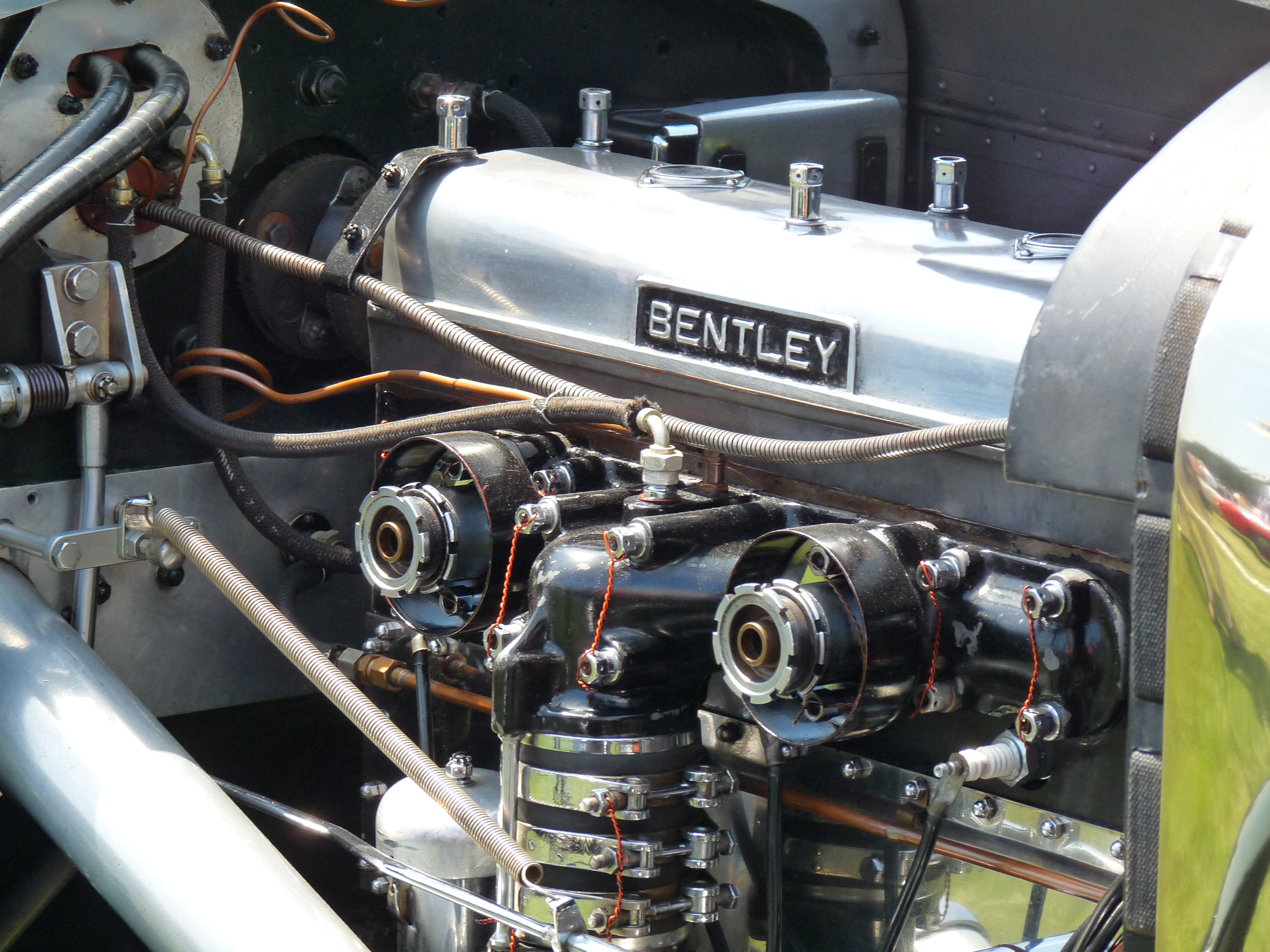
Intake manifold of a "Blower Bentley"

The essential difference between the Bentley 4½ Litre and the Blower was the addition of a Roots-type supercharger to the Blower engine by engineer Amherst Villiers, who had also produced the supercharger. W. O. Bentley, as chief engineer of the company he had founded, refused to allow the engine to be modified to incorporate the supercharger. As a result, the supercharger was placed at the end of the crankshaft, in front of the radiator. This gave the Blower Bentley an easily recognisable appearance and also increased the car's understeer due to the additional weight at the front. A guard protected the two carburetters located at the compressor intake. Similar protection was used, both in the 4½ Litre and the Blower, for the fuel tank at the rear, because a flying stone punctured the 3 Litre of Frank Clement and John Duff during the first 24 Hours of Le Mans, which contributed to their defeat.

The crankshaft, pistons and lubrication system were special to the Blower engine. It produced 175 hp (130 kW) at 3,500 rpm for the touring model and 240 hp (180 kW) at 4,200 rpm for the racing version, which was more power than the Bentley 6½ Litre developed.

In 2019–2020, Bentley scanned all 630 components that made up the Blower so that they could digitally re-create it and create 12 new models. In December 2020, Bentley Blower Car Zero, the first example of the Blower Continuation Series was presented. The car was built in Crewe according to the historic specifications and based on the production processes of that period.

4½ Litre supercharged cars

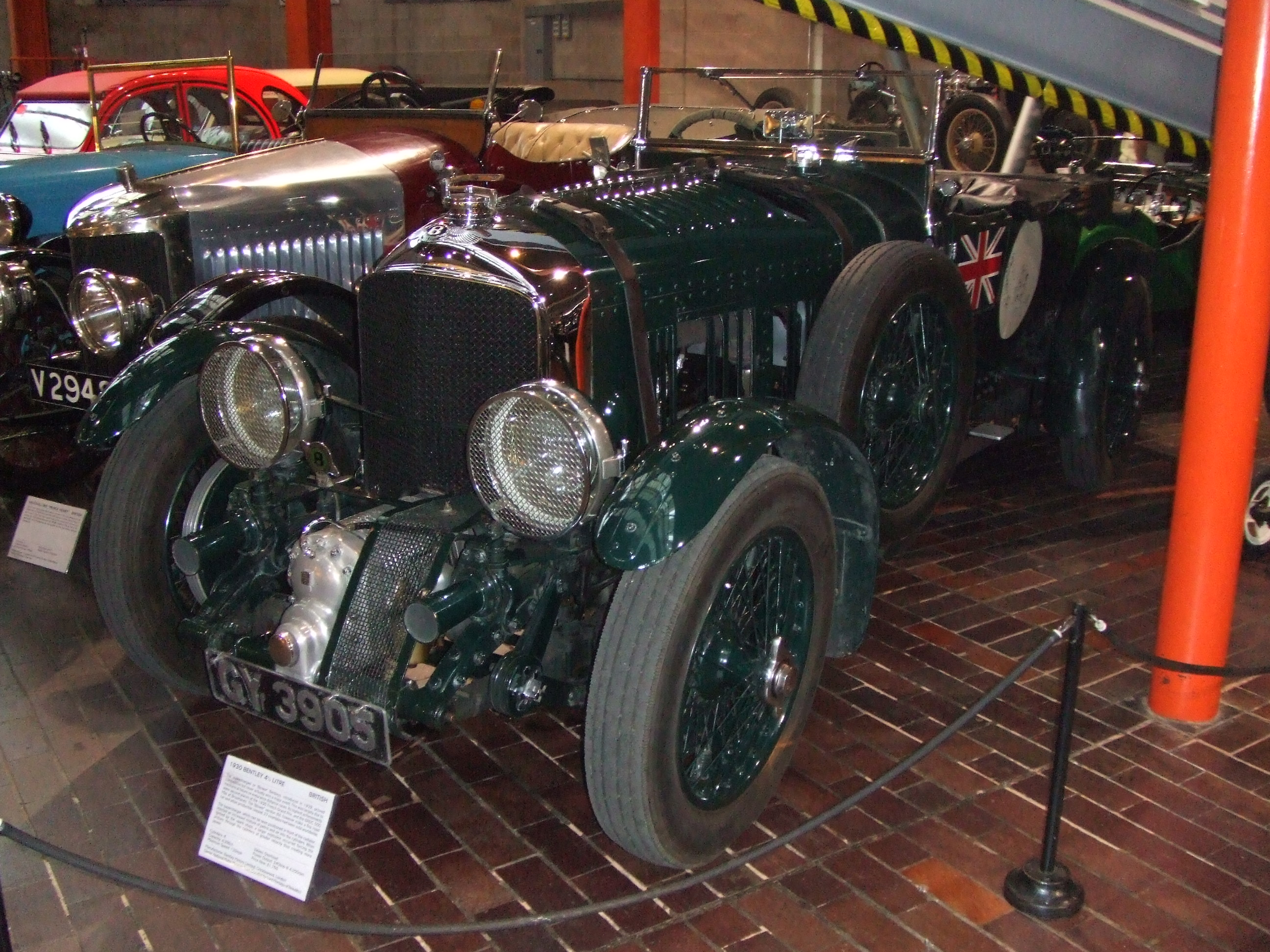
Supercharged engine MS3948, a late 1931 replica-bodied car in the Beaulieu National Motor Museum (see external link below)

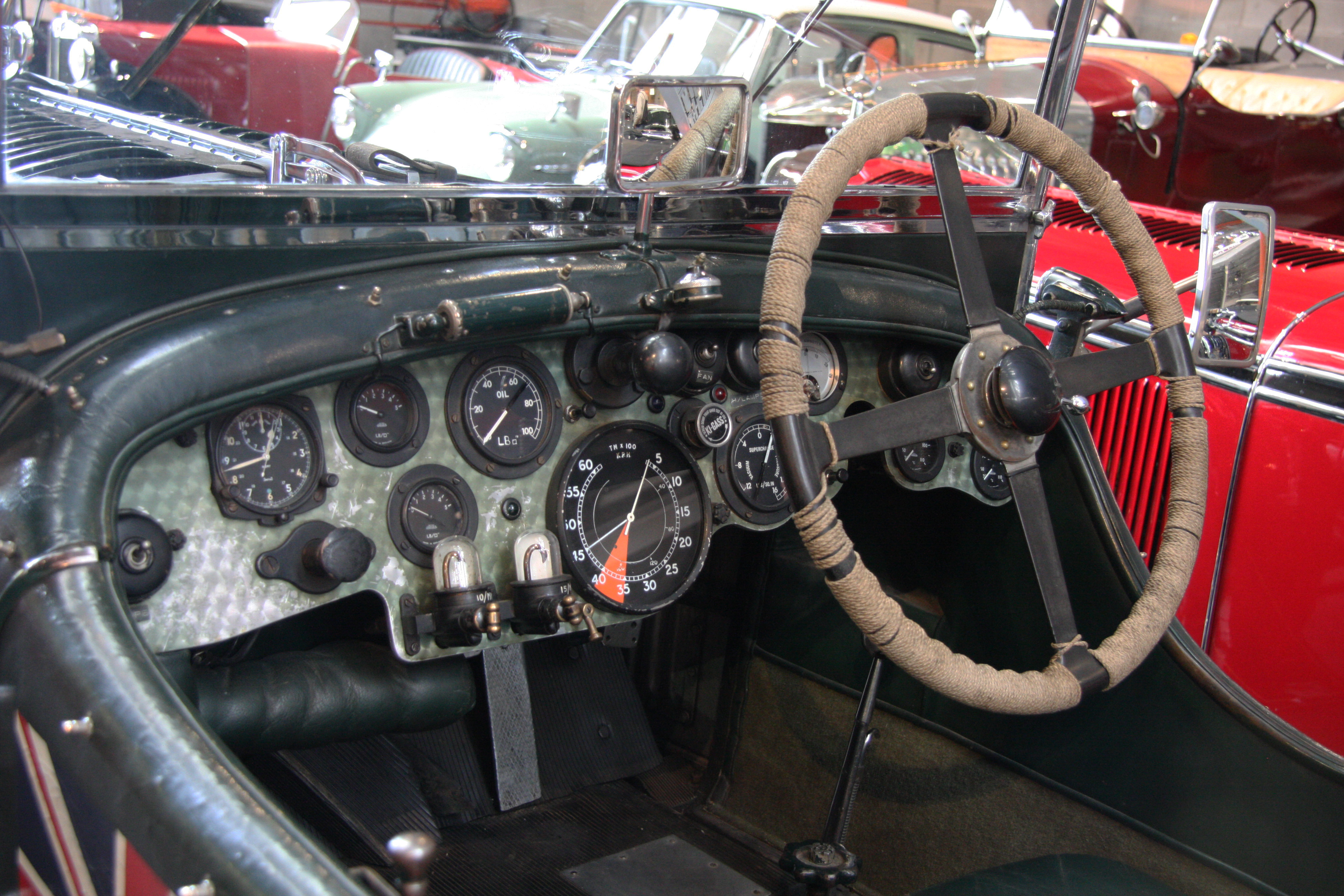
S/c engine MS3948 dashboard

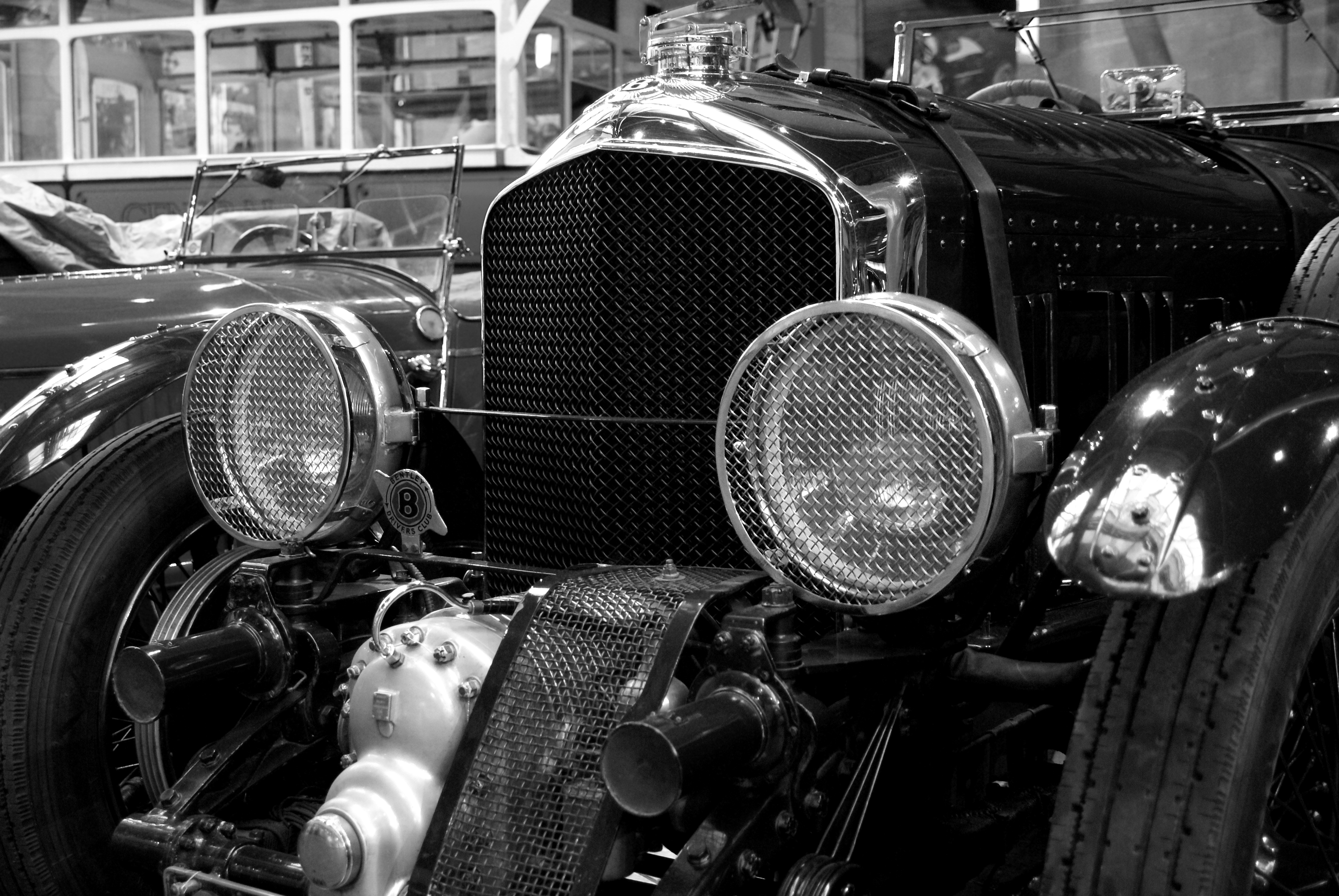
S/c engine MS3948 Another view of the grille, supercharger, and inlets

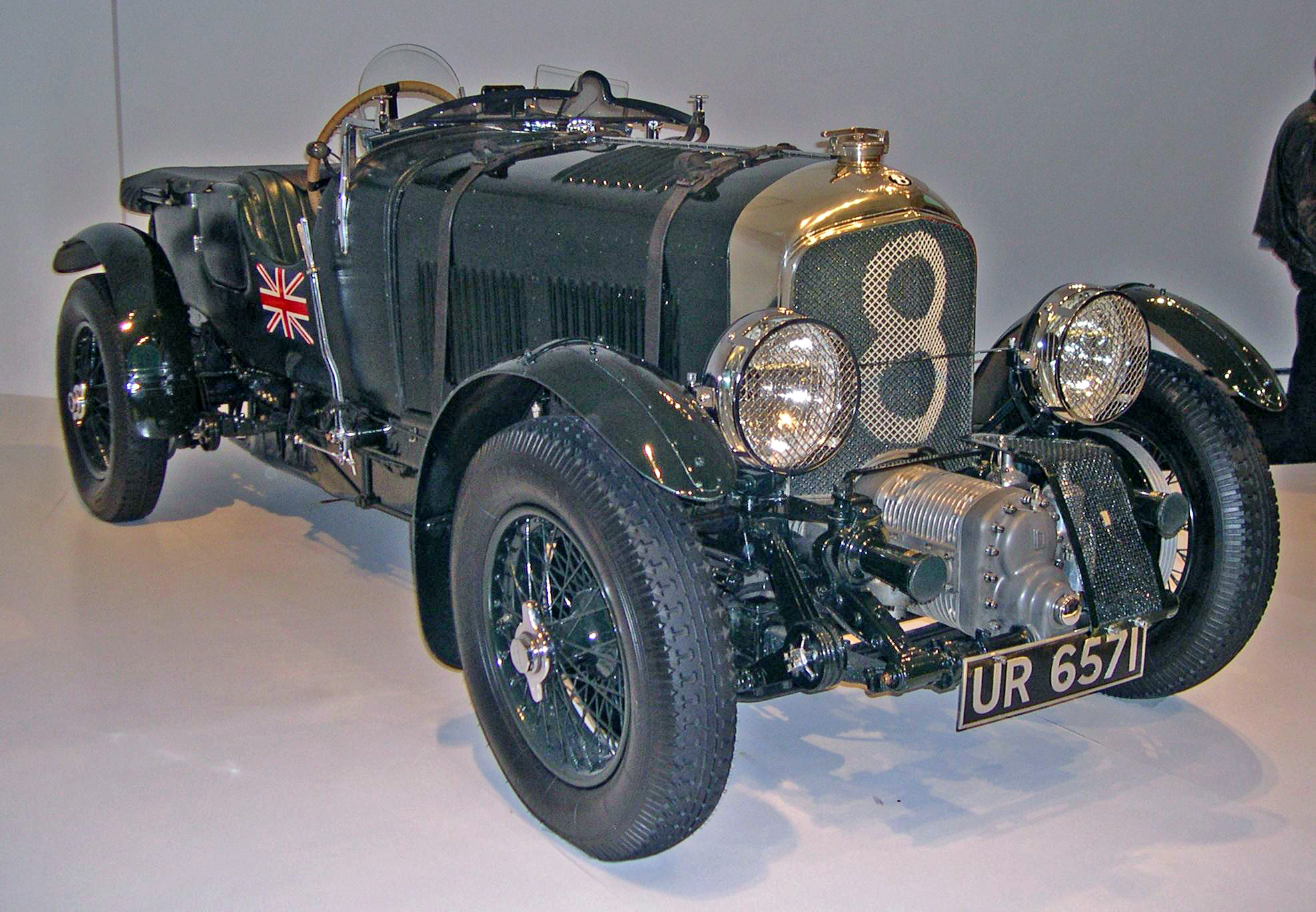
A Blower Bentley from the collection of Ralph Lauren.

== Competition performance ==
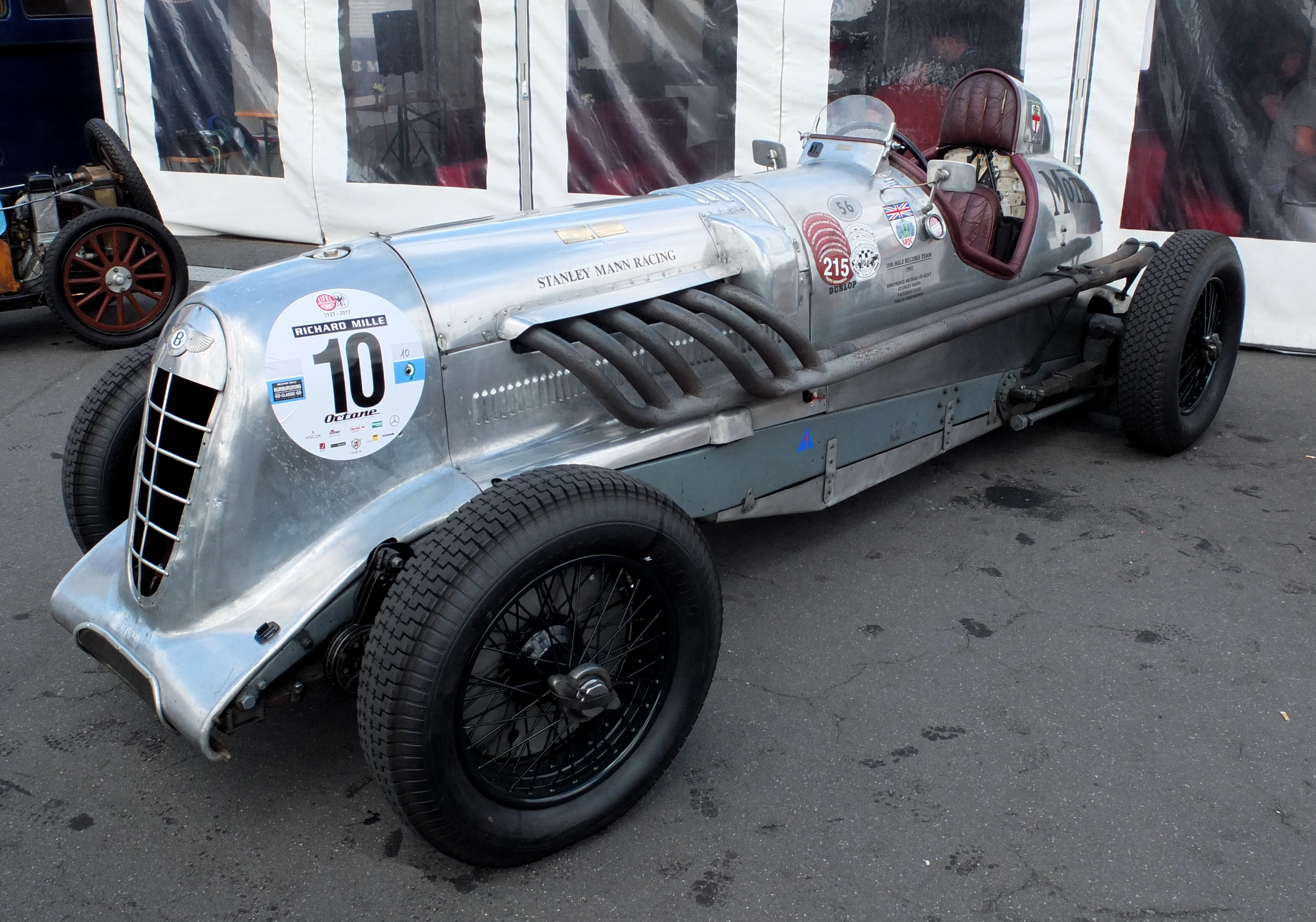
Bentley racing car "Mother Gun", built 1927, 4.5 L engine.

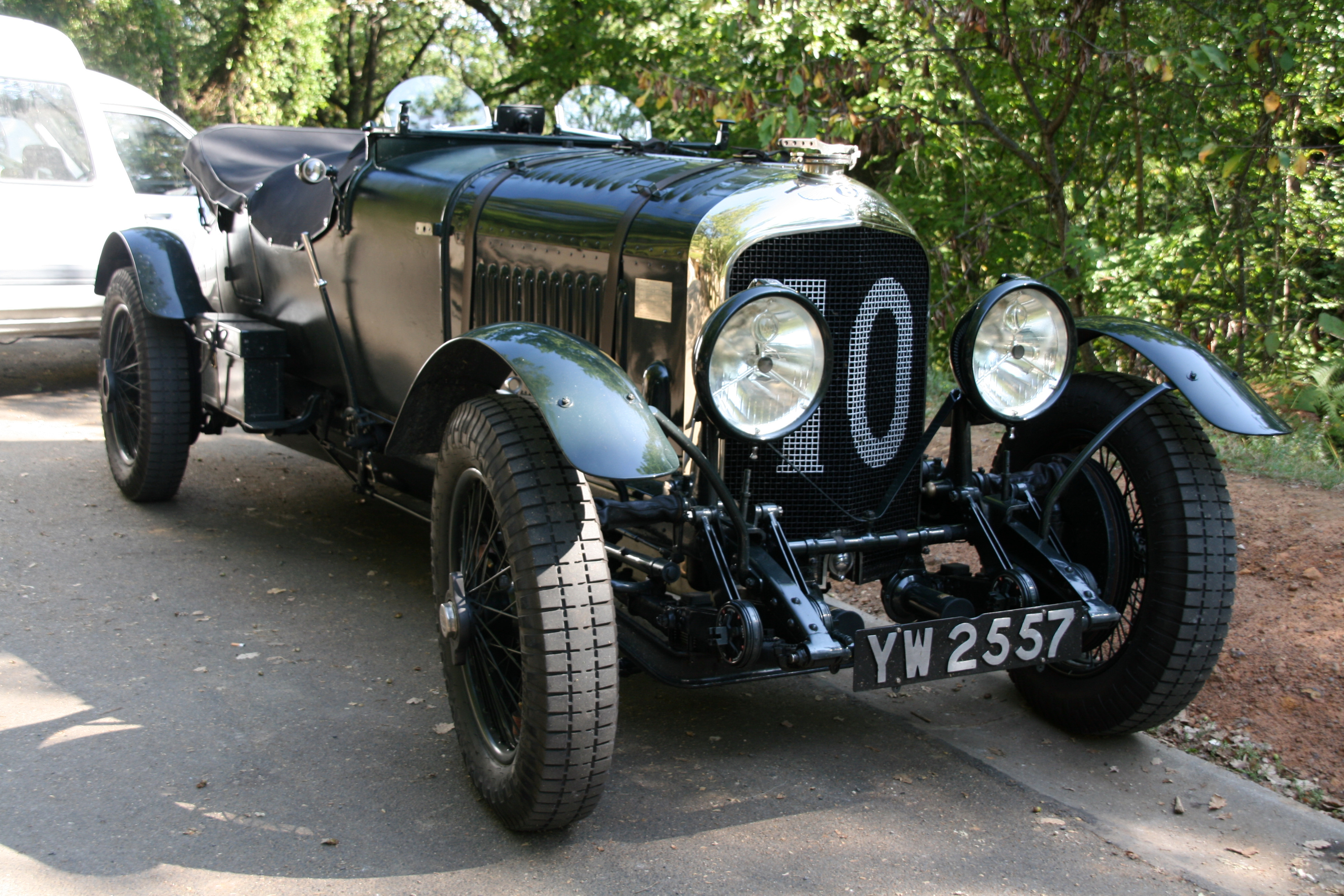
Bentley 4½ Litre No. 10 took third at the 1929 24 Hours of Le Mans

Between 1927 and 1931 the Bentley 4½ Litre competed in several competitions, primarily the 24 Hours of Le Mans. The first was the Old Mother Gun at the 1927 24 Hours of Le Mans, driven as a prototype before production. Favored to win, it instead crashed and did not finish. Its performance was sufficient for Bentley to decide to start production and deliver the first models the same year.

Far from being the most powerful in the competitions, the 4½ Litre of Woolf Barnato and Bernard Rubin, raced neck and neck against Charles Weymann's Stutz Blackhawk DV16, setting a new record average speed of 111.12 km/h (69 mph); Tim Birkin and Jean Chassagne finished fifth. The next year, three 4½ Litres finished second, third, and fourth behind another Bentley, the Speed Six, which possessed two more cylinders.

The naturally aspirated 4½ Litre was noted for its good reliability. The supercharged models were not; the two Blower models entered in the 1930 24 Hours of Le Mans by Dorothy Paget, one of which was co-driven by Tim Birkin, did not complete the race. In 1930, Birkin finished second in the French Grand Prix at the Circuit de Pau behind a Bugatti Type 35. Ettore Bugatti, annoyed by the performance of Bentley, called the 4½ Litre the "fastest lorry in the world." The Type 35 is much lighter and consumes much less petrol. Blower Bentleys consume 4 liters per minute at full speed.

Despite the Blower's record of poor reliability, Mildred Bruce, a British female racer, achieved a 24-hour distance record at Montlhéry in one, attaining an average speed of 89.4 mph (143.9 km/h). In 1930, the Daily Herald offered a trophy for the fastest driver at an event at Brooklands. The first year, Tim Birkin and Kaye Don competed and Kaye Don won with a speed of 137.58 mph (221.41 km/h). In 1932, Tim Birkin won driving his red Blower "Monoposto," clocking 137.96 mph (222.03 km/h).

Bentley 4½ Litre at Le Mans
| Year | Competition | Position | Drivers | Team | Model |
|---|---|---|---|---|---|
| 1928 | 24 Hours of Le Mans | 1 | (United Kingdom) Woolf Barnato (Australia) Bernard Rubin | (United Kingdom) Bentley Motors Ltd. | Bentley 4½ Litre |
| 1929 | 24 Hours of Le Mans | 2 | (United Kingdom) Jock Lawson Dunfee (United Kingdom) Glen Kidston | (United Kingdom) Bentley Motors Ltd. | Bentley 4½ Litre |
| 1929 | 24 Hours of Le Mans | 3 | (United Kingdom) Dr. Dudley Benjafield (France) André d’Erlanger | (United Kingdom) Bentley Motors Ltd. | Bentley 4½ Litre |
| 1930 | French Grand Prix | 2 | (United Kingdom) Sir Henry (Tim) Birkin | (United Kingdom) Bentley Motors Ltd. | Blower Bentley |
| 1930 | 500 miles of Brooklands | 2 | (United Kingdom) Dr. Dudley Benjafield (United Kingdom) Edward R. Hall | (United Kingdom) Bentley Motors Ltd. | Bentley 4½ Litre |

== End of production ==
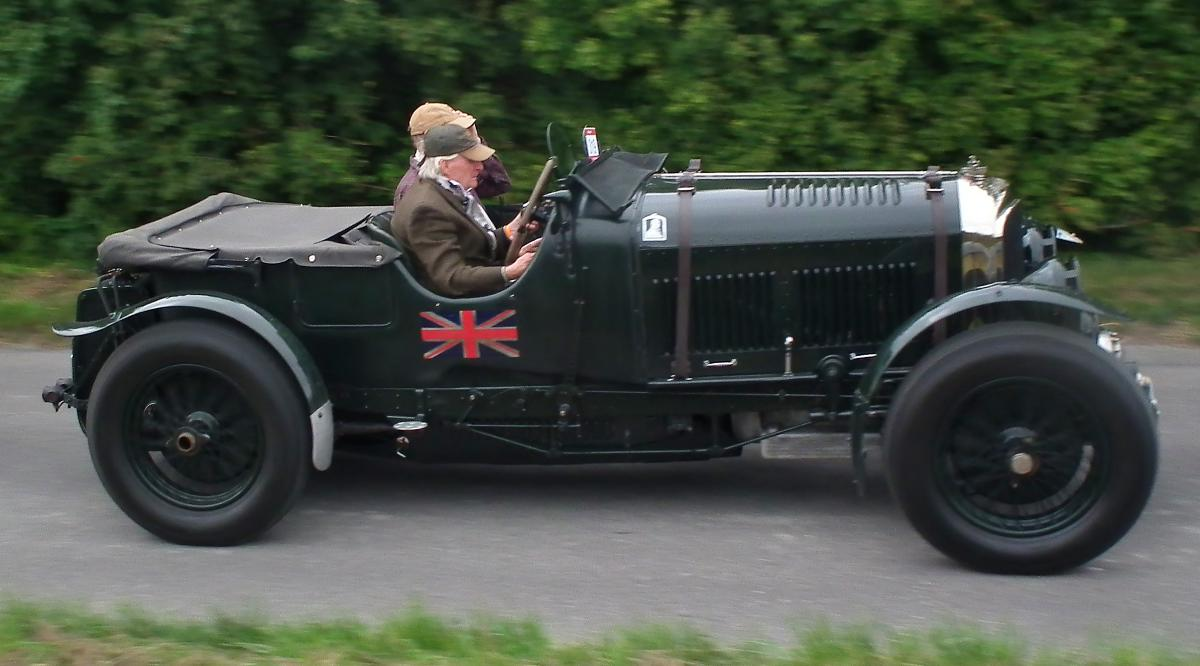
Supercharged car GN1767 mounts Kop Hill 22 September 2013

In November 1931, after selling 720 copies of the 4½ Litre – 655 naturally aspirated and 55 supercharged – in three different models (Tourer, Drophead Coupé and Sporting Four Seater), Bentley was forced to sell his company to Rolls-Royce for £125,175, a victim of the recession that hit Europe following the Wall Street crash of 1929.

== Current status ==
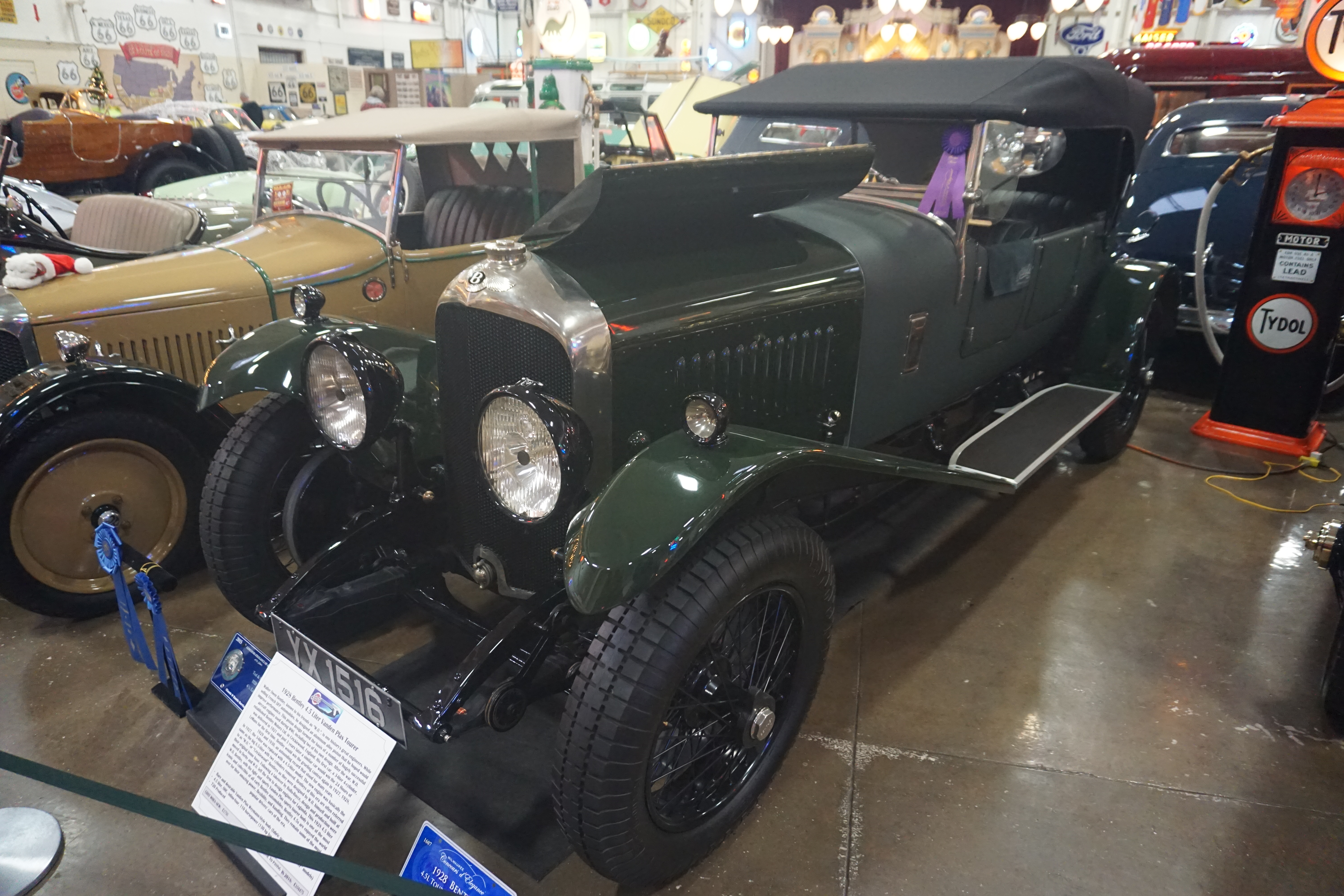
1928 Bentley 4½ Litre at Stahls Automotive Collection

As of 2013, Bentley 4½ Litre automobiles from this inter-war period – the "Belle Époque" of the automobile for some – sold for around €1,000,000. Blowers can fetch more than €7 million and are coveted by collectors despite never winning a single race. For many, the 4½ Litre is to automobiles what the Spitfire is to aircraft.

== Popular culture ==
James Bond drives a 1930 Blower Bentley in Ian Fleming's first three novels featuring the character, Casino Royale, Live and Let Die and Moonraker. In the books, Bond drives one of the last Blower Bentleys built, a battleship grey Convertible Coupé, with French Marchal headlamps.

== See also ==
- Bentley 6½ Liter

== Bibliography ==
- Bellu, Serge (1998). Histoire mondiale de l'automobile (in French). Flammarion. pp. 101–102. ISBN 978-2-08-013901-6.
- Bonnafous, Gilles (24 November 2006). "Historique Bentley avant-guerre" (in French). p. 1.
- Bonnafous, Gilles (7 December 2006b). "Bentley et la compétition". Motorlegend (in French). pp. 1–4.
- Bouzanquet, Jean Francois (2009). Fast Ladies: Female Racing Drivers 1888 to 1970. Veloce Publishing. p. 176. ISBN 978-1-84584-225-3.
- Cheetham, Craig (2006). Vintage Cars. Five-View Series. MotorBooks International. ISBN 978-0-7603-2572-8.
- Feast, Richard (2004). "Chapter 3: Vintage Years". The DNA of Bentley. St. Paul MN USA: MotorBooks International. pp. 46–50. ISBN 978-0-7603-1946-8. "W. O.'s answer was the four-cylinder 4 1/2-litre, which was essentially two-thirds of the six-cylinder 6 1/2; its actual engine displacement was 4.4 litres."
- de Geyer d'Orth, Niels (30 October 2008). "Un demi-siècle de James Bond cars". Autonews (in French). Archived from the original on 10 May 2009.
- Gunnhor, Richard (2006). Supercars : les voitures les plus extraordinaires au monde (in French). Gremese Editore. p. 320. ISBN 978-88-7301-623-6.
- Husband, Stuart (July 2009). "The Fabulous Bentley Boys" (PDF). The Rake (8). Revolution Press: 130–149. Archived from the original (PDF) on 13 June 2010. "They were a bunch of wild, fabulously wealthy devil-may-carers, united by a love of insouciance, elegant tailoring, and a need for speed, who established Bentley's reputation by revving their sports models past the winning posts of 24 Hours of Le Mans – the world's most famous endurance race – on four straight occasions between 1927 and 1930."
- Johnson, Harvey (Fall 2011). Verschoor, Ron (ed.). "The Eight-Litre: Bentley's Last is Bentley's Best". The Classic Car. LIX (3). Beverley Hills, CA USA: Classic Car Club of America: 3–11. ISSN 0009-8310. "The single-overhead-camshaft four-valves-per-cylinder design incorporating a shaft-bevel-gear drive was used in this 3-litre car (as well as in the later 4-1/2-litre cars)."
- Martin, Fraser (25 July 2010). "1930 Bentley Blower". Car Middle East. Archived from the original on 29 August 2010.
- Melissen, Wouter (29 May 2008). "Bentley 4.5 Litre 'Blower' Birkin Monoposto". Ultimatecarpage.
- Purdy, Ken W. (September 1969). "The Big Green Bentley". Boys' Life. 59 (9): 27, 72–73. ISSN 0006-8608.
- Rogliatti, Gianni (1973). Posthumus, Cyril Posthumus (ed.). Period Cars. Feltham, Middlesex, UK: Hamlyn. p. 132. ISBN 0-600-33401-5.
- Sparke, Penny (2003). Un siècle de design automobile (in French). Flammarion. ISBN 978-2-08-011083-1.
- Vaughan, Daniel (April 2008). "1927 Bentley 4.5 Liter". ConceptCarz.com.
- "Bentley 4,5 Litre". Christies.com. 2004.
- "Bentley 4 1/2-Liter "Blower"". Sports Car Market. 31 August 1995. Archived from the original on 7 August 2011.
- "History By Chassis – List of all W. O. Bentleys with original chassis nos. 4 1/2 Litre (Page 1)". VintageBentleys.Org. Houston, TX USA: Robert McLellan. 2006. Archived from the original on 9 October 2010.
- L'Atlas des bolides : 100 ans de voitures de course (in French). Atlas. 2003. p. 240. ISBN 978-2-7234-4315-9.
