= Bentley Blower No.1 =

Racing car developed from the Bentley 4.5L

Bentley Blower No.1 Brooklands Battleship
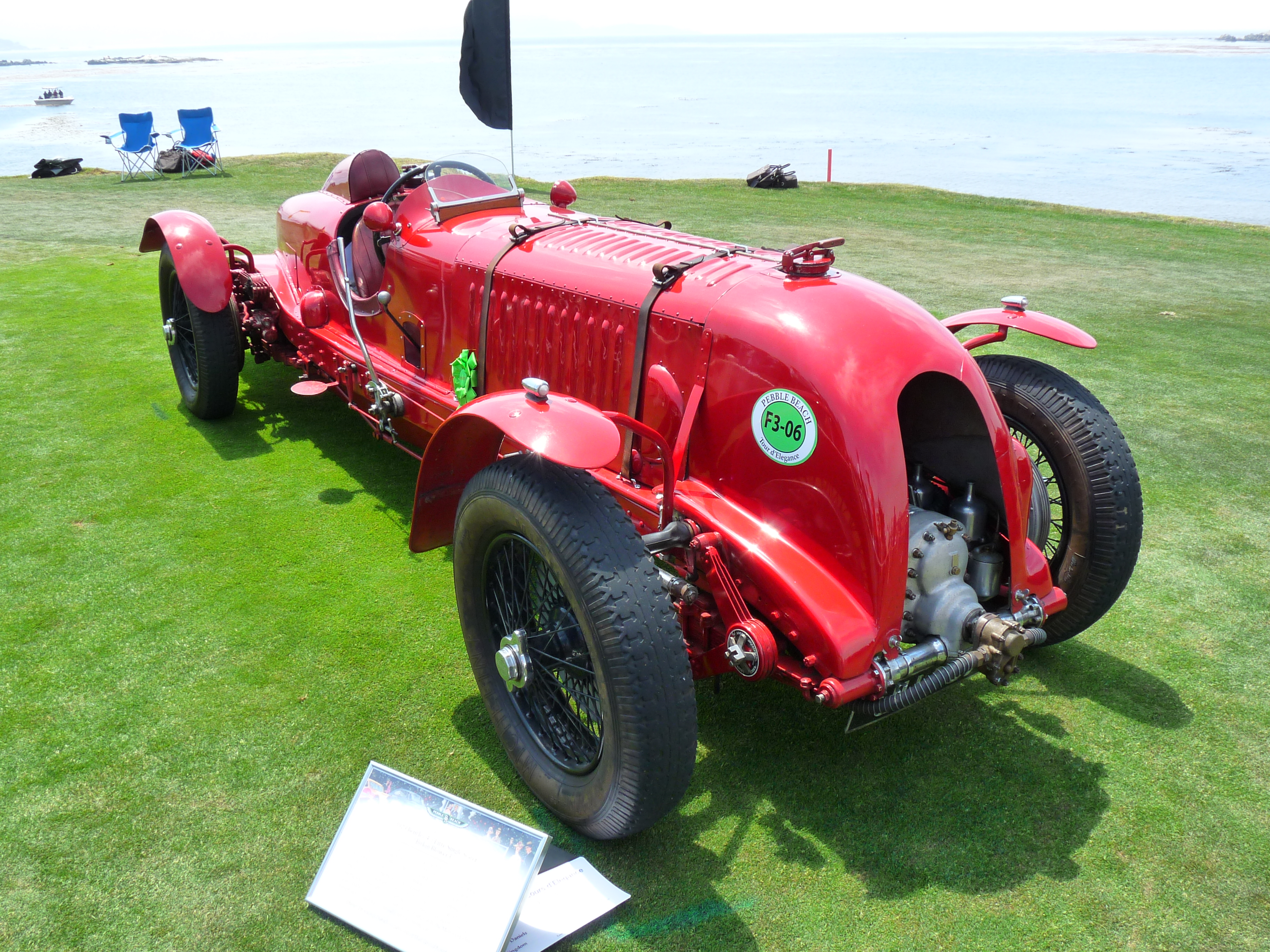
- Constructor: Sir Henry "Tim" Birkin
- Designers: Sir Henry "Tim" Birkin, Clive Gallop, Amherst Villiers

Technical specifications
- Chassis: Steel-lattice ladder
- Suspension (front): Semi-elliptic leaf springs, 17-inch (430 mm) drum brakes
- Suspension (rear): Semi-elliptic leaf springs, 17-inch (430 mm) drum brakes
- Length: 4,380 mm (172 in)
- Wheelbase: 3,302 mm (130.0 in)
- Engine: 4,398 cc (268.4 cu in); 100 mm (3.9 in) bore/140 mm (5.5 in) stroke front mounted inline 4
- Transmission: 4 speed unsynchronized manual
- Weight: 1,625 kg (3,583 lb)

Competition history
- Notable drivers: Sir Henry "Tim" Birkin
Races	F/Laps
1929 Brooklands 500 mile endurance	Brooklands, 1931 137.96 miles per hour (222.03 km/h)

Bentley Blower No.1 is a racing car developed from the Bentley 4½ Litre by Sir Henry "Tim" Birkin to win the Le Mans twenty-four-hour race. The car was developed into its current form for racing at Brooklands.

In June 2012, the car was sold by Bonhams for £5,042,000 at the Goodwood Festival of Speed.

== Background ==
In 1921 Sir Henry "Tim" Birkin turned to motor racing, competing in a few races at Brooklands. Business and family pressure then forced him to retire from the tracks until 1927 when he entered a three-litre Bentley for a six-hour race. For 1928 he acquired a 4½ litre car and after some good results decided to return to motor racing, very much against his family's wishes. Soon Birkin was one of the Bentley Boys, described as "the greatest Briton of his time" by W. O. Bentley. In 1928 Birkin entered the Le Mans race again, leading the first twenty laps until a jammed wheel forced him to drop back, finishing fifth. He won the race in 1929, racing the Speed Six as co-driver to Woolf Barnato.

== Base car ==
W. O. Bentley wanted a more powerful car, so he developed a bigger model, the Speed Six.

It was a huge car. Ettore Bugatti once referred to the Bentley as "the world's fastest lorry" ("Le camion plus vite du monde").

Bentley adhered strictly to his own assertion that increasing displacement is always preferable to forced induction:

To supercharge a Bentley engine was to pervert its design and corrupt its performance

However, in the winter of 1926/7, chassis FR5189, a 3-litre car, was the first car fitted with a supercharger at the factory. Using a Roots-type blower over the front axle, it was unsuccessfully raced by May Cunliffe in 1927.

By 1928, Birkin had come to the same conclusion that the future lay in getting more power from a lighter model, by fitting a supercharger to the 4½ litre Bentley. When Bentley Motors refused to create the supercharged model, Birkin determined to develop it himself.

== Development ==
Birkin set up his own engineering works for the purpose of developing the car at Welwyn Garden City, Hertfordshire. With financial backing from Dorothy Paget, a wealthy horse racing enthusiast financing the project after his own money had run out, and technical help from Clive Gallop, Birkin engaged supercharger specialist Amherst Villiers. Mercedes-Benz had been using compressors for a few years.

In the pursuit of power, the 4½ Litre Bentley engine had a distinct advantage. A single overhead camshaft actuated four valves per cylinder, inclined at 30 degrees, a technically advanced design at a time where most cars used only two valves per cylinder. Secondly the cars tanks – radiator, oil and petrol – had filler caps that did not unscrew but were easily removed with one stroke of a lever. This saved time during stops.

W.O. believed that the supercharger corrupted his design. The huge Roots-type supercharger, known in racing circles as a blower, was added in front of the radiator and driven straight from the crankshaft. This gave the Blower Bentley a unique and easily recognisable profile, and exacerbated its understeer. The crankshaft, pistons and lubrication system were also special to the Blower engine.

A guard protected the two carburetters located at the compressor intake. Similar protection was used (both in the 4½ Litre and the Blower) for the fuel tank at the rear, because a flying stone punctured the 3 Litre of Frank Clement and John Duff during the first 24 Hours of Le Mans, possibly depriving them of victory.

The mechanical additions and modifications took the power of the base car from:

- Unblown: touring model 110 bhp (82 kW); racing model 130 bhp (97 kW)
- Blower: touring model 175 bhp (130 kW) @ 3,500rpm; racing model 242 bhp (180 kW) @ 4,200 rpm

The Blower Bentley was born, more powerful than the 6½ Litre despite lacking the two additional cylinders. The downside was that Blower Bentleys consumed 4 litres of fuel per minute at full speed.

== Production ==
The original No.1 had a taut canvas top stretched over a lightweight Weymann aluminium frame, housing a two-seat body. This presented a very light but still resistant to wind structure. It was officially presented in 1929 at the British International Motor Show at Olympia, London.

No.1 first appeared at the Essex six hour race at Brooklands on 29 June 1929. However, the car initially proved to be very unreliable. W.O. had never accepted the Blower Bentley, but with effective company owner and financial backer Barnato's support, Birkin persuaded W.O. to produce the fifty supercharged cars necessary for the model to be accepted for Le Mans.

In addition to these production cars built by Bentley Motors, Birkin put together a racing team of four remodelled prototypes plus a spare

- No.1: a track car for Brooklands, but with headlights and mudguards
- No.2, 3 and 4: road registered (No.2 – GY3904; No.3 – GY3905)
- No.5: a fifth car, registered for the road, assembled from spare parts

== Racing ==
While the naturally aspirated 4½ Litre was noted for its good reliability, the supercharged models were generally not.

=== 1929 ===
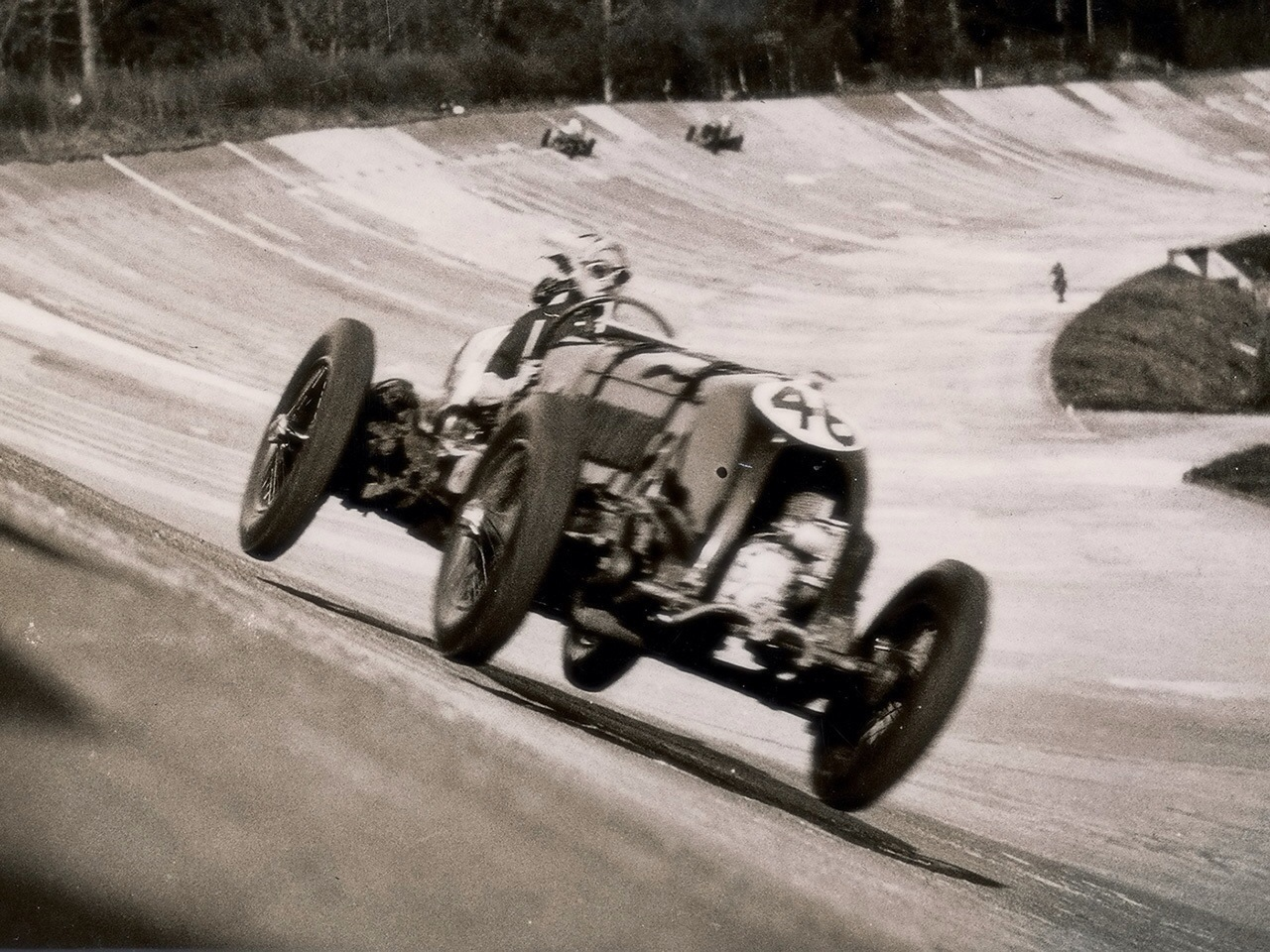
Tim Birkin racing Bentley Blower No.1 at Brooklands in 1929.

Birkin entered No.1 in a 500 miles (800 km) endurance race at Brooklands in 1929. However, during the race its lightweight fabric two-seater body caught fire due to a cracked exhaust. Earning itself the nickname the Brooklands Battleship, as after putting the fire out Birkin kept racing. Paget resultantly paid for No.1 to be re-bodied with a single aluminium shell by Reid Railton, and painted in their racing red colour.

=== 1930 ===
==== Le Mans ====
The cars were too late for Le Mans in 1929, hence Birkin's co-driving of the Speed Six, and only two of the cars reached the start line in 1930. After an epic duel between Dudley Benjafield and Birkin's privately entered Blower Bentleys, and Rudolf Caracciola's Mercedes SSK, all three retired leaving the victory to the Bentley works team Speed Six of Barnato and Glen Kidston. According to some, Birkin's courage and fearless driving, in particular his selflessly harrying Caracciola into submission, are regarded as embodying the true spirit of the vintage racing era.

==== French Grand Prix ====
For 1930, motor sports enthusiast Eugène Azemar, who was involved with the Tourist Board in Saint-Gaudens in southern France, succeeded in persuading the Automobile Club du Midi to arrange a Grand Prix race in the region. Laying out a triangular, Le Mans-type track, the circuit became known as the Circuit de Morlaas.

Hoping to run the race to the International Formula, when the response was poor the event was postponed and changed to a Formula Libre event instead. The new date meant that the Italian teams were unable to attend, leaving it to be mostly an internal French affair with sixteen Bugattis, two Peugeots and a Delage among the twenty five starters. Birkin did not race No. 1, he raced the second road race-prepared supercharged 4.5., registered UR 6571.

The race distance was twenty five laps of the 15.8 kilometres (9.8 mi) track, making a total of 396 kilometres (246 mi). Philippe Étancelin nursed his Bugatti Type 35 home with a 2.5 minute lead to take victory, Birkin was next, 14 seconds behind, and Zanelli third.

=== 1931 ===
Bentley Motors withdrew from racing in 1930, and closed down the following year. It was purchased by Rolls-Royce Limited in 1931, which did not authorise racing for a few more. Dorothy Paget withdrew her support for Birkin's racing team in October 1930, but continued to support Birkin in No.1.

In 1930, the Daily Herald offered a trophy for the fastest driver at an event at Brooklands. The first year, Birkin and Kaye Don competed in opposing Blower tourers, with Kaye winning with a speed of 137.58 miles per hour (221.41 km/h). In 1932, Tim Birkin won driving his red Blower Monoposto, clocking 137.96 mph (222.03 km/h).

The track record stood for two years, before being beaten by John Cobb driving the 24 litre Napier-Railton.

== Birkin's death ==
Birkin kept his motor workshop going for two years after the withdrawal of Paget's financial support in 1930, by entering into a partnership with Mike Couper. The partnership developed a business specialising in tuning high performance cars, but closed down together with the works in 1932.

On 7 May 1933 Birkin started the Tripoli Grand Prix in a new 3 L Maserati 8C owned by fellow driver Bernard Rubin, finishing third. During his pit stop Birkin burnt his arm badly against the hot exhaust pipe while picking up a cigarette lighter. There are different opinions of what then happened. The traditional view is that the wound turned septic, whilst others say Birkin suffered from a malaria attack. It was probably a combination of both that proved fatal, and Birkin died at Countess Carnavon Nursing Home, London on 22 June 1933.

== Sale ==
In light of his penniless estate, the family sold off most of his non-core assets, including No.1. In the 1970s, the car was bought by noted watchmaker and vintage car collector George Daniels. In June 2012, after Daniels' death, the car was sold by Bonhams for £5,042,000 at the Goodwood Festival of Speed.

== Bentley Blower Continuation Series, Car Zero (2020–) ==
It is a limited (12 units) version of 1930's Bentley Blower, built from the design drawings and tooling jigs used for the original four Blowers built and raced by Sir Henry 'Tim' Birkin in the late 1920s, which included Bentley's own Team Car (Chassis HB 3403, engine SM 3902, registration UU 5872 – Team Car #2).

The Car Zero prototype took 40,000 hours of work.
