= Tim Birkin =

British racing driver

Sir Tim Birkin
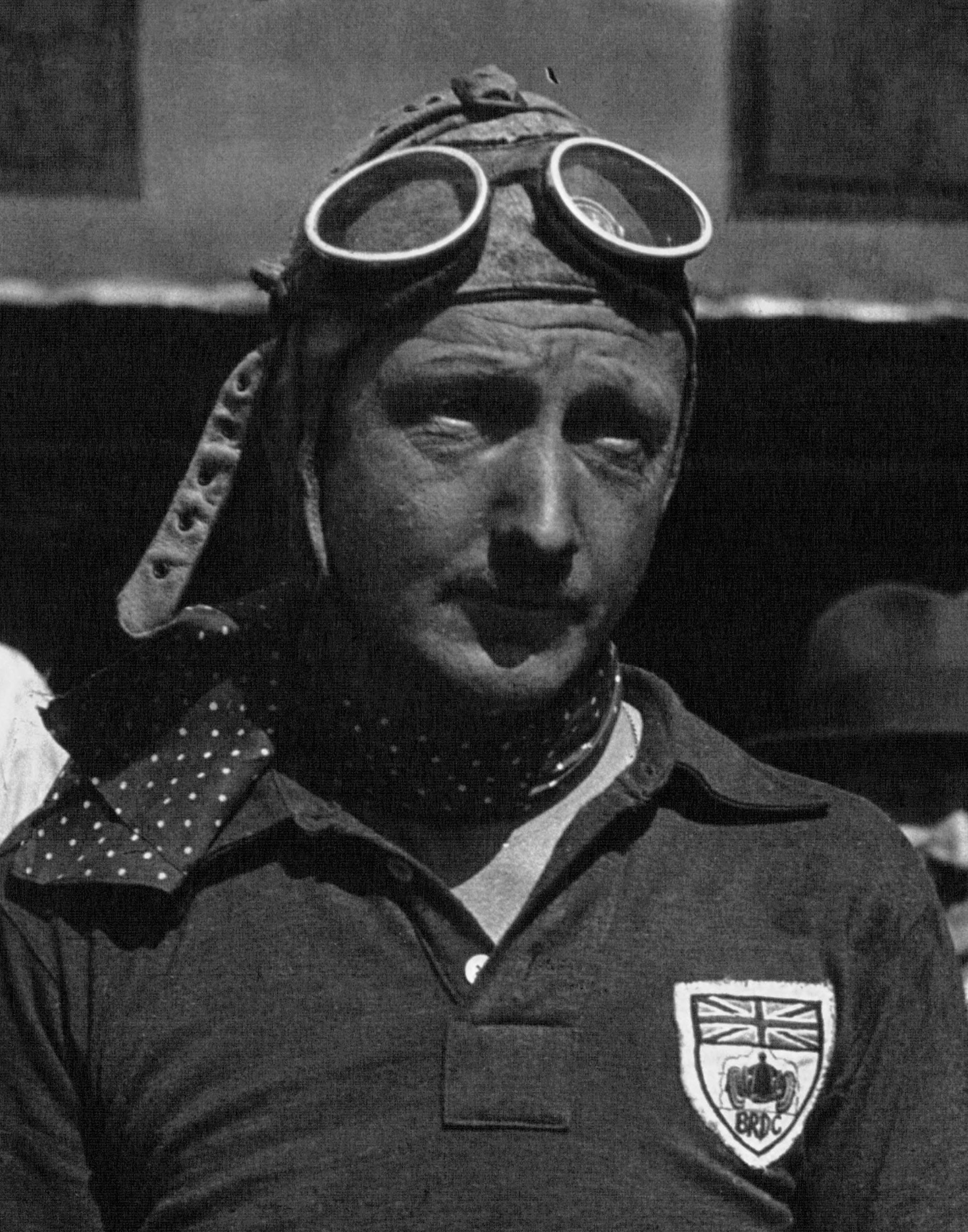
- Tim Birkin at the 1931 24 Hours of Le Mans
- Nationality: (United Kingdom) British
- Born: Henry Ralph Stanley Birkin; 26 July 1896 Nottingham, United Kingdom
- Died: 22 June 1933 (aged 36) London, United Kingdom
- Relatives: Archie Birkin (brother); Cindy Buxton (granddaughter); Rose Hanbury (great-granddaughter)

24 Hours of Le Mans career
- Years: 1928–1932
- Teams: Bentley Motors Ltd. Private
- Best finish: 1st (1929, 1931)
- Class wins: 2 (1929, 1931)

Sir Henry Ralph Stanley Birkin, 3rd Baronet (26 July 1896 – 22 June 1933), known as Tim Birkin, was a British racing driver, one of the "Bentley Boys" of the 1920s.

== Background and family ==
Birkin was born into a wealthy Nottingham family in 1896, the son of Sir Thomas Stanley Birkin, 2nd Baronet, and the Hon. Margaret Diana Hopetoun Chetwynd. In childhood, Henry Birkin gained the nickname "Tim", after the children's comic book character Tiger Tim, created by Julius Stafford Baker, who was extremely popular at the time. It was his nickname for the rest of his life.

Birkin married Audrey Clara Lilian Latham, daughter of Sir Thomas Paul Latham, 1st Baronet, and Florence Clara Walley, and sister of Sir Herbert Latham, 2nd Baronet, on 12 July 1921; they divorced in 1928. He and Audrey had two daughters, Pamela and Sara, both of whom married and had issue. The elder daughter Pamela (d. 1983) married two Buxton cousins in succession, and her second husband was the Life Peer Baron Buxton of Alsa, KCVO, MC. She had seven children including wildlife film-maker Cindy Buxton. The younger daughter Sara (d. 1976) married twice, and had two sons by her first husband.

At his death in 1933, without sons of his own, Birkin was succeeded by his next surviving male relative, his paternal uncle Sir Alexander Russell Birkin, 4th Baronet (died 1942). His younger brother, Archie Birkin, was killed during practice for the 1927 Isle of Man TT motorcycle races.

== Military career ==
Birkin joined the Royal Flying Corps during World War I and gained the rank of Lieutenant in the service of the 108th (Norfolk and Suffolk Yeomanry) Field Brigade, serving in Palestine where he contracted malaria, a disease from which he would suffer for the rest of his life.

== Racing career ==
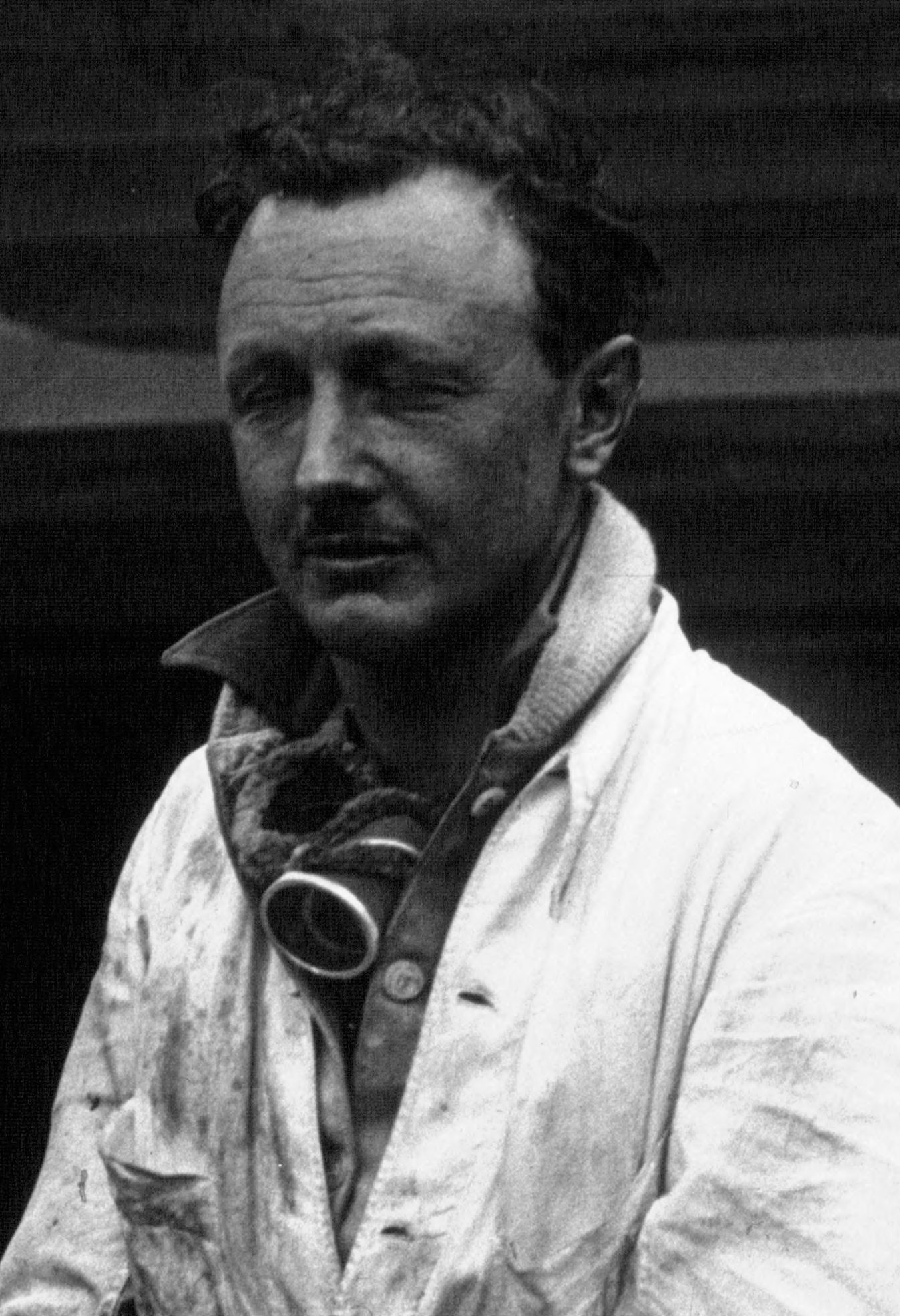
Tim Birkin at the 1929 24 Hours of Le Mans.

In 1921, Birkin turned to motor racing, competing in a few races at Brooklands. Business and family pressures then forced him to retire from the tracks until 1927 when he entered a three-litre Bentley for a six-hour race. For 1928 he acquired a 4½ litre car and after some good results decided to return to motor racing, very much against his family's wishes. Soon Birkin, racing with a blue and white spotted silk scarf around his neck, would be a familiar sight on the race tracks driving with the works team (the "Bentley Boys"). In 1928, Birkin entered the Le Mans race again, leading the first twenty laps until a jammed wheel forced him to drop back, finishing fifth with co-driver Jean Chassagne who heroically rescued the abandoned, damaged car, winning the hearts of the crowds; Chassagne received a trophy from W.O. Bentley in recognition of this extraordinary feat.

The next year, Birkin was back as winner, racing the "Speed Six" as co-driver to Woolf Barnato. If Bentley wanted a more powerful car he developed a bigger model and the Speed Six was a huge car. Ettore Bugatti once referred to the Bentley as "the world's fastest lorry" ("Le camion plus vite du monde"). Back in 1928, however, Birkin had come to the conclusion that the future lay in getting more power from a lighter model by fitting a supercharger to the 4½ litre Bentley. When Bentley Motors refused to create the supercharged model, Birkin sought he determined to develop it himself. With technical help from Clive Gallop and supercharger specialist Amherst Villiers, and with Dorothy Paget financing the project after his own money had run out, Birkin rebuilt the car at the engineering works he had set up for the purpose at Welwyn Garden City in Hertfordshire. Adding a huge Roots-type supercharger ("blower") in front of the radiator driven straight from the crankshaft gave the car a unique appearance. The 242 bhp "blower Bentley" was born.

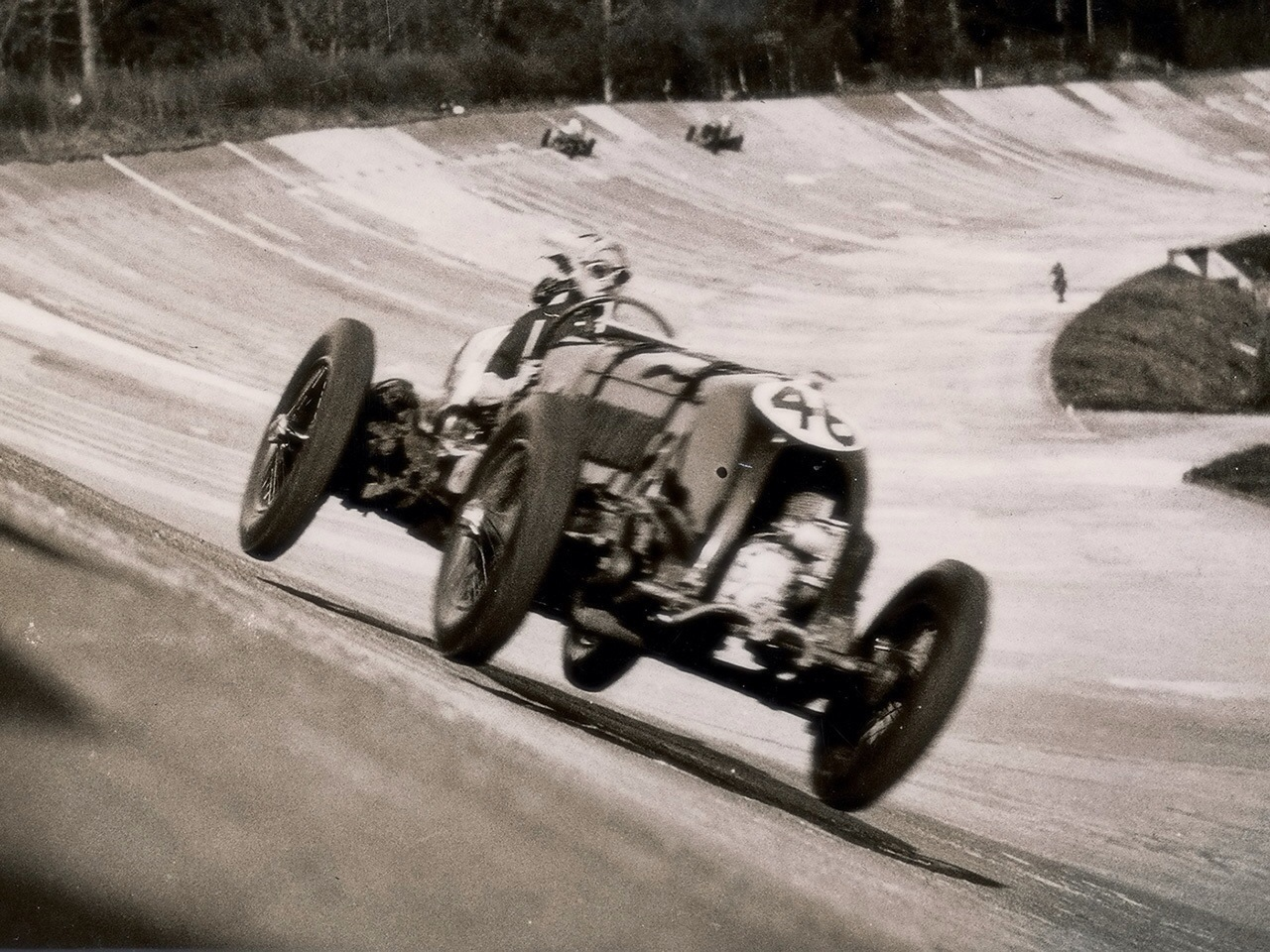
Tim Birkin racing Bentley Blower No.1 at Brooklands in 1929.

The first car, a stripped down Brooklands racer known as Bentley Blower No.1, first appeared at the Essex six-hour race at Brooklands on 29 June 1929. However, the car initially proved to be very unreliable. W.O. Bentley himself had never accepted the blower Bentley. Nevertheless, with Woolf Barnato's support, Birkin persuaded "W.O." to produce the fifty supercharged cars necessary for the model to be accepted for the Le Mans twenty-four-hour race. In addition to these production cars built by Bentley Motors, Birkin put together a racing team of four remodelled "prototypes" (three road cars for Le Mans and Blower No.1) and assembled a fifth car from spare parts. Birkin's blower Bentleys were too late for Le Mans in 1929 and only two of the cars reached the start line in 1930. After an epic duel between Dudley Benjafield and Birkin's privately entered blower Bentleys and Rudolf Caracciola's Mercedes SSK all three retired, leaving the victory to the Bentley works team Speed Six of Barnato and Glen Kidston. Birkin's courage and fearless driving, in particular his selflessly harrying Caracciola into submission, are regarded as embodying the true spirit of the Vintage Racing era.

Back in 1925, the energetic motor sports enthusiast Eugène Azemar, who was involved with the Tourist Board in Saint-Gaudens in southern France, succeeded in persuading the Automobile Club du Midi to arrange a Grand Prix race in the region. A great success, the Saint-Gaudens track later got the honor of hosting the 1928 French Grand Prix. If they can, so can we, thought the city council in the nearby town of Pau and decided to try to take the French Grand Prix to their own town. Pau had some Grand Prix traditions, as the town held the honour of arranging the first race ever to be called a Grand Prix back in 1901. For the 1930 Grand Prix a triangular, Le Mans-type track outside the city was selected. Known as the Circuit de Morlaas it should not be confused with the well-known street track in the Parque Beaumont. The French had hoped to run the race to the International Formula, but when the response was poor the event was postponed and changed to a Formula Libre event instead. The new date meant that the Italian teams were unable to attend, leaving it to be mostly an internal French affair with sixteen Bugattis, two Peugeots and a Delage among the twenty five starters. Among the top Bugatti drivers were Louis Chiron, Marcel Lehoux, Count Stanislas Czaikowski, Jean-Pierre Wimille, Philippe Étancelin and William Grover-Williams.

A curiosity in the largely single-seat entry list was Birkin's blower Bentley touring car, stripped down to racing trim, with headlights and mudguards removed. The race distance was twenty five laps of the 15.8 km track, making a total of 396 km. Guy Bouriat took an early lead, followed by Williams, Zanelli, Czaikowski and Étancelin, with Birkin as first non-Bugatti driver, in sixth place. Williams in a works Bugatti then became the next leader. Czaikowski fell back through the field and Bouriat in the other works Bugatti made a pitstop giving over the car to Chiron. Then Williams also had to make a stop for a new wheel. That all made way for Étancelin to advance and he was followed by Birkin, the track with its long straights suiting the supercharged Bentley perfectly.

At one-third distance Chiron led, followed by Étancelin, Williams and Birkin. Birkin's fourth place became a third as Williams got engine troubles but then Zanelli, who had made an early stop, came rushing through the field pushing Birkin back to fourth. At lap ten "Sabipa" crashed and was thrown out of his Bugatti, Birkin only avoiding the injured driver by the slightest of margins. After eleven laps Chiron encountered problems with oil pressure and Étancelin took over the lead. Soon Chiron was also passed by Zanelli and Birkin. The Bentley driver used his horn to warn the Bugatti to move over, surely a unique occurrence in Grand Prix racing! With seven laps to go Zanelli made another pitstop and Birkin was up into second place. While Étancelin, with a 2.5-minute lead, nursed his Bugatti home to take victory, Zanelli had not given up and was catching Birkin fast. At the flag the margin was down to fourteen seconds but it was enough for the British Bentley driver to make Grand Prix history.

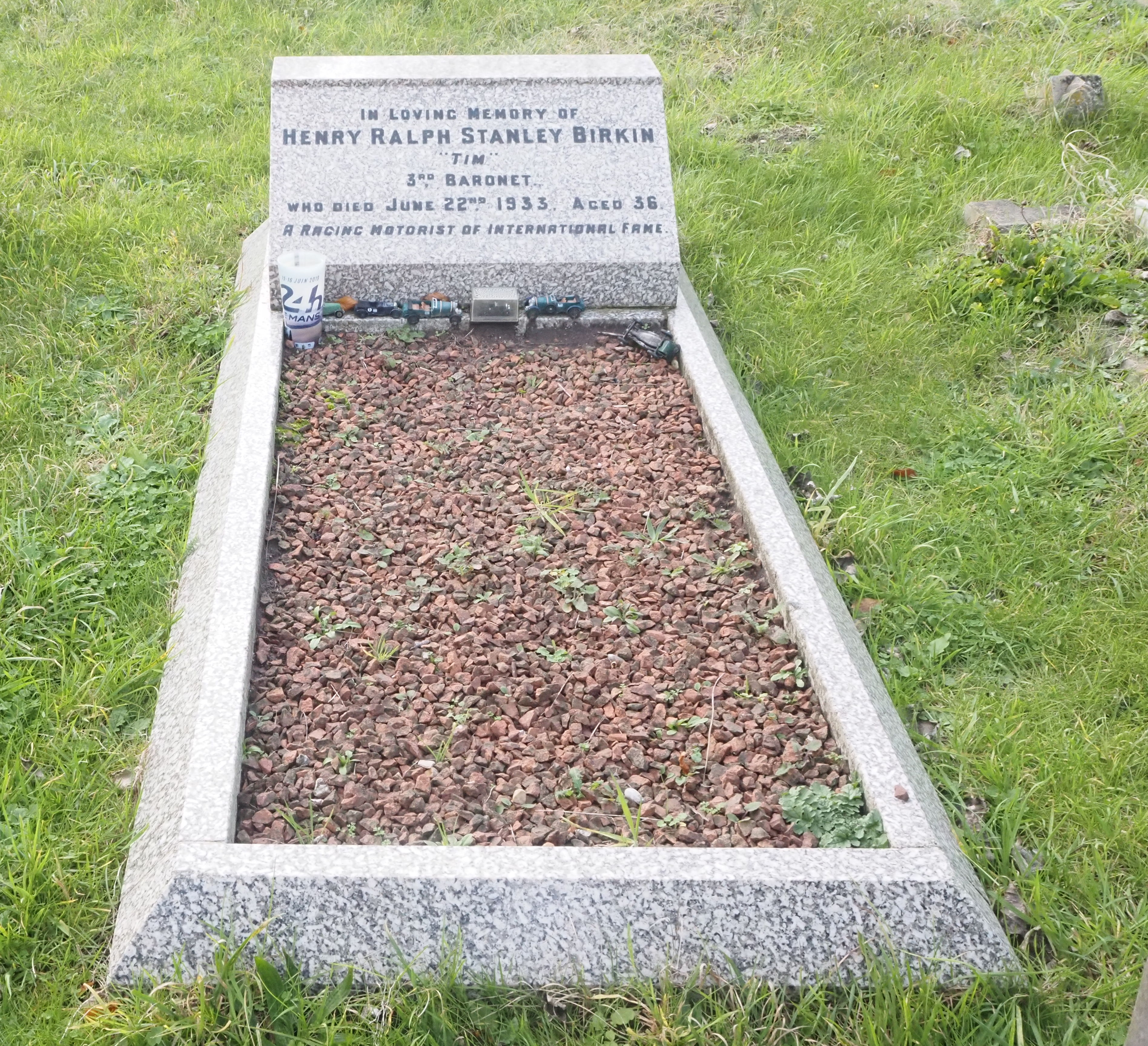

== Death ==
Birkin's life changed dramatically at the end of 1930. Bentley Motors withdrew from racing and closed down the following year. (Although purchased by Rolls-Royce the marque did not reappear for several years.) Dorothy Paget withdrew her support for Birkin's road team in October 1930. She continued however to support Birkin's red single seater track car, the original Blower No.1. The car (nicknamed the Brooklands Battleship) had been re-bodied with a single shell by Reid Railton after its lightweight fabric two seater body had caught fire in the 1929 500-mile race due to a cracked exhaust. Birkin kept his motor workshop going by entering into a partnership with Mike Couper and developing a business specialising in tuning high performance cars. In addition, an "electric model Brooklands" – an elaborate miniature racetrack game with motorized cars running on single rails – was manufactured at the works. Birkin's partnership with Couper came to an end in 1932 however and the works closed.

Birkin continued racing despite these setbacks. In 1931, he won Le Mans with Earl Howe in an Alfa Romeo, even receiving a telegram from Mussolini congratulating him on his "win for Italy". On 24 March 1932, he raised the Brooklands Outer Circuit lap record to 137.96 mph in the Brooklands Battleship, a record which stood for another two years before being beaten by John Cobb driving the 24-litre Napier Railton. On 7 May 1933, he started the Tripoli Grand Prix in a new 3 L Maserati 8C owned by fellow driver Bernard Rubin, finishing third. During his pit stop, Birkin burnt his arm badly against the hot exhaust pipe while picking up a cigarette lighter. There are different opinions of what then happened. The traditional view is that the wound turned septic, whilst others say Birkin suffered from a malaria attack. It was probably a combination of both that proved fatal, as Birkin died at Countess Carnavon Nursing Home in London 22 June 1933, aged thirty-six. He was buried in the churchyard at St Nicholas Church, Blakeney, Norfolk.

== Memorial ==
Birkin's life was portrayed in the 1995 TV drama Full Throttle with comedian Rowan Atkinson in the role of Birkin.

In 2000, the last 54 of the Bentley Arnage Green label powered cars were created as a limited edition, called "The Birkin Arnage." German aftermarket tuner MTM have latterly produced a tuned version of the Bentley Continental GT called "The Birkin Edition," producing 641 hp.

Birkin House, a Victorian country guest house in Stinsford, Dorchester, is named after Birkin.

The artist Terence Cuneo unveiled his painting The 'Spirit of Brooklands', which shows Tim Birkin racing John Cobb as the result of a wager, three laps of Brooklands to win. Cobb drove a ten and a half-litre Delage, once holder of the land speed record, and Birkin his four and a half supercharged Bentley, the 'Brooklands Battleship.' The higher top speed of the Bentley gave Birkin the edge over the distance, and the painting depicts Birkin on the outside line of the high banking edging past Cobb to win. The actual race had taken place in the August Bank Holiday of 1932, and Birkin had won by 25 yards after a third lap at 137 mph.

== Racing record ==
=== Complete European Championship results ===
(key) (Races in bold indicate pole position)

Year	Entrant	Make	1	2	3	EDC	Points	Ref
1931	Private entry	Maserati	ITA	FRA; 4	BEL; 4	16=	16	

=== Complete 24 Hours of Le Mans results ===
Year	Team	Co-Drivers	Car	Class	Laps	Pos.	Class Pos.
1928	(United Kingdom) Bentley Motors Ltd	(France) Jean Chassagne	Bentley 4½ Litre	5.0	135	5th	5th
1929	(United Kingdom) Bentley Motors Ltd	(United Kingdom) Woolf Barnato	Bentley Speed Six	8.0	174	**1st**	**1st**
1930	(United Kingdom) Hon. Dorothy Paget	(France) Jean Chassagne	Bentley 4½ Litre 'Blower'	>3.0	138	DNF (Engine)	
1931	(United Kingdom) Earl Howe (private entrant)	(United Kingdom) Francis Curzon, Earl Howe	Alfa Romeo 8C-2300 LM	3.0	184	**1st**	**1st**
1932	(United Kingdom) Earl Howe (private entrant)	(United Kingdom) Francis Curzon, Earl Howe	Alfa Romeo 8C-2300 LM	5.0 **	110	DNF (Engine)	
Sources:

- Note **: equivalent class for supercharging, with x1.33 modifier to engine capacity.

== Bibliography ==
- Birkin, Henry Ralph Stanley (1932). Full Throttle (Hardback). London: G.T. Foulis & Co. Ltd.
- Kenny, Paul (2009). The Man Who Supercharged Bond: The Extraordinary Story of Charles Amherst Villiers (Hardback). Sparkford: Haynes Publishing. ISBN 978-1-84425-468-2.

Sporting positions
Preceded by Woolf Barnato; Bernard Rubin	Winner of the 24 Hours of Le Mans; 1929 with Woolf Barnato	Succeeded by Woolf Barnato; Glen Kidston
Preceded by Woolf Barnato; Glen Kidston	Winner of the 24 Hours of Le Mans; 1931 with The Earl Howe	Succeeded by Raymond Sommer; Luigi Chinetti
Baronetage of the United Kingdom
Preceded by Thomas Birkin	Baronet (of Ruddington Grange); 1931–1933	Succeeded by Alexander Birkin
