= Amherst Villiers =

English automotive engineer and painter (1900–1991)

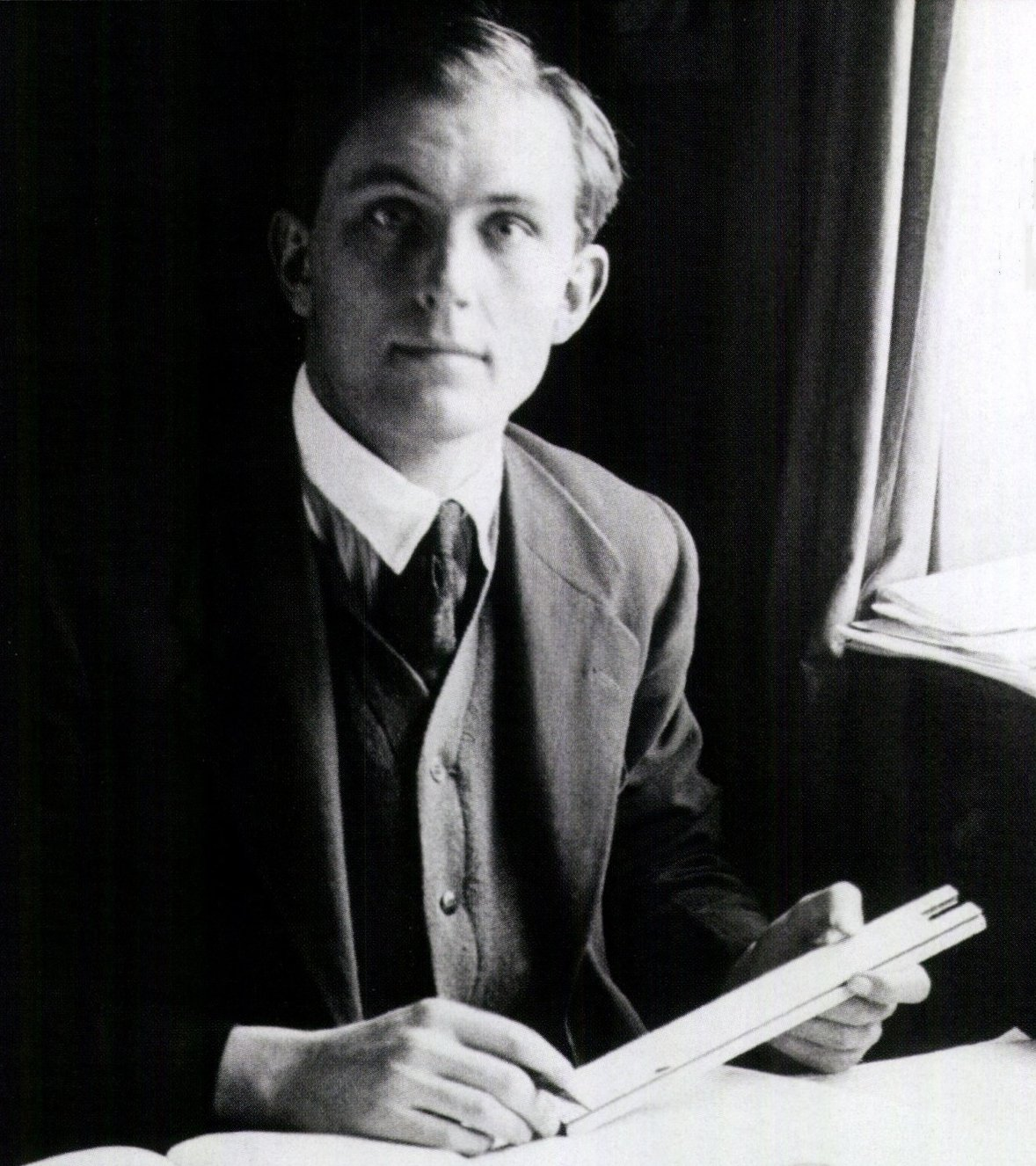
- Born: 9 December 1900; London, England
- Died: 12 December 1991 (aged 91)
- Education: Oundle School
- Alma mater: Gonville and Caius College, Cambridge
- Spouse(s): Maya de Lisle Adam (divorced); Juanita Lorraine Brown
- Children: 2
- Parent(s): Ernest Amherst Villiers; Elaine Augusta Guest

Amherst Villiers (1900–1991) was an English automotive, aeronautical and astronautic engineer and portrait painter. He designed a land speed record-breaking car for Malcolm Campbell, and developed the supercharged "Blower Bentley", driven by Henry Birkin and (in fiction) by James Bond.

== Early life ==
Charles Amherst Villiers was born in London on 9 December 1900, the son of Ernest Amherst Villiers and the Hon. Elaine Augusta Guest.

He was educated at Oundle School and at Gonville and Caius College, Cambridge.

== Career ==
Villiers began his automotive career modifying Brescia Bugattis and supercharging a Vauxhall for racing driver Raymond Mays. He designed the Napier-Campbell Blue Bird which Malcolm Campbell used to break the land speed record in 1927 with an average speed of 174.88 mph.

The 'Blower Bentley' was developed in 'Bentley Boy' Henry 'Tim' Birkin's workshop in 1929, using an Amherst Villiers supercharger bolted to the front of a Bentley 4½ Litre, to boost its maximum power in the production version to 175 brake horsepower (130 kW). The first of five racing specials was the Brooklands-designed Bentley Blower No.1, which had an output of 242 brake horsepower (180 kW). The Blower Bentley's never won a major race, but it set new lap records at Brooklands. Apart from the racing specials, fifty production blower Bentleys were built in order that the car could be entered at Le Mans.

In 1930 he bought from the Air Ministry one of the Gloster IV biplanes which had been used by the RAF High Speed Flight as practice machines for the Schneider Trophy. He was planning to install an unsupercharged geared Napier Lion racing engine and remove the floats for an attempt to break the world air speed record, but the plans did not come to fruition.

In 1936 Villiers developed a 120/130 hp four-cylinder aero engine, the Amherst Villiers Maya I (named after his wife). The engine was first tested in a B.A. Eagle and later in Villiers' own Miles Whitney Straight, but did not go into production.

During the Second World War he served as a ferry pilot.

After the war he joined the "Brain drain" of scientists and engineers moving to the United States to work on the space programme. He became a portrait painter in New York, and his portraits of his friends Ian Fleming and Graham Hill hang in the National Portrait Gallery in London. In Fleming's first James Bond novel, Casino Royale, Bond drives a 4.5-litre Bentley with the Amherst Villiers supercharger.

== Personal life ==
Charles Amherst Villiers married, first, Maya de Lisle Adam. After they were divorced he married Juanita Lorraine Brown. Juanita Lorraine Brown Villiers and Charles Amherst Villiers had two children, Charles Churchill Villiers and Veronica Jane Villiers.

He died on 12 December 1991.

== Bibliography ==
- Kenny, Paul (2009). The Man Who Supercharged Bond: The Extraordinary Story of Charles Amherst Villiers (Hardback). Sparkford: Haynes Publishing. ISBN 978-1-84425-468-2. Official Author Website
