= John Cobb (racing driver) =

British racing driver (1899–1952)

John Rhodes Cobb
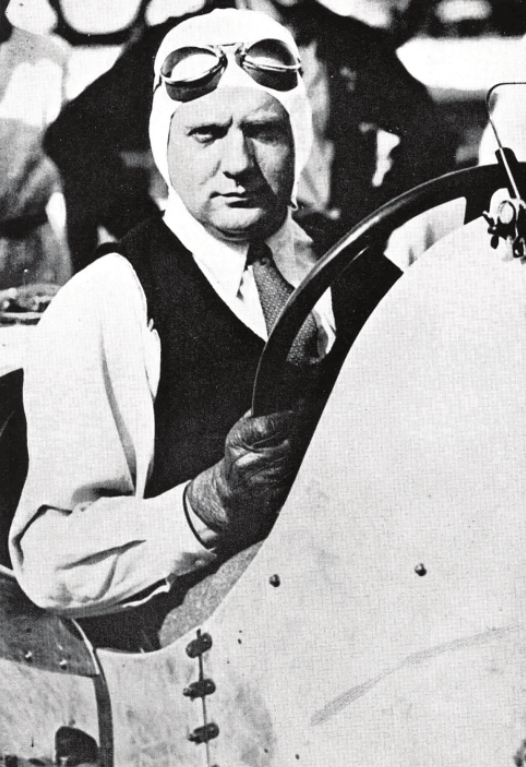
- At Brooklands
- Born: 2 December 1899; Esher, Surrey, England
- Died: 29 September 1952 (aged 52); Loch Ness
- Cause of death: Crash during water speed record attempt
- Resting place: Christ Church, Esher
- Known for: Speed record holder
- Spouse(s): Elizabeth Mitchell-Smith (1947–1948) (her death); Vera Victoria Henderson (m. 1950–1952) (his death)

John Rhodes Cobb (2 December 1899 – 29 September 1952) was an early to mid 20th century English racing motorist. He was three times holder of the World Land Speed Record, in 1938, 1939 and 1947, set at Bonneville Speedway in Utah, US. He was awarded the Segrave Trophy in 1947. He was killed in 1952 whilst piloting a jet-powered speedboat attempting to break the World Water Speed Record on Loch Ness in Scotland.

== Early life ==
Cobb was born in Esher, Surrey, on 2 December 1899, near the Brooklands motor racing track which he frequented as a boy. He was the son of Florence and Rhodes Cobb, a wealthy furs broker in the City of London. He received his formal education at Eton College and Trinity Hall, Cambridge, before joining his father's firm and pursuing a successful career as the managing director of a number of companies in the trade, the personal financial resources from which he used to fund a passion for large-capacity motor, high-speed racing. In 1924 he acquired a Royal Aero Club aviator's certificate, qualifying as a pilot in the Sopwith Grasshopper.

== Racing and speed records career ==
Cobb won his first track race in a 1911 10-litre Fiat in 1925, and raced in the Higham Special at Brooklands race track in 1926.

In 1928, Cobb privately purchased a 10.5-litre Delage which was imported to England from the factory in Paris, which he raced at Brooklands from 1929 to 1933, breaking the flying start outer lap Record three times in these years, and being clocked at a top speed of 138.88 miles per hour on 2 July 1932. In 1932 he also won the British Empire Trophy at Brooklands.

In 1933, Cobb privately commissioned the design and construction of the 24-litre "Napier Railton" from "Thomson & Taylor", with which he broke a number of track speed records, including setting the ultimate lap record at the Brooklands race track which was never surpassed, driving at an average speed of 143.44 mph (230.84 km/h) achieved on 7 October 1935, having earlier overtaken the 1931 record set by Sir Henry "Tim" Birkin driving Bentley Blower No.1, and regaining it from his friend Oliver Bertram. With the Napier-Railton, he also won the International 500 Miles Race at Brooklands in 1935 with Tim Rose-Richards, and won with a solo drive two years later, when the race was run to 500 kilometers.

In the 1934 RAC Tourist Trophy race on the Ards Circuit near Belfast, the Lagondas of Cobb and the Hon Brian Lewis competed in the class for larger sports cars against Eddie Hall in a Bentley.

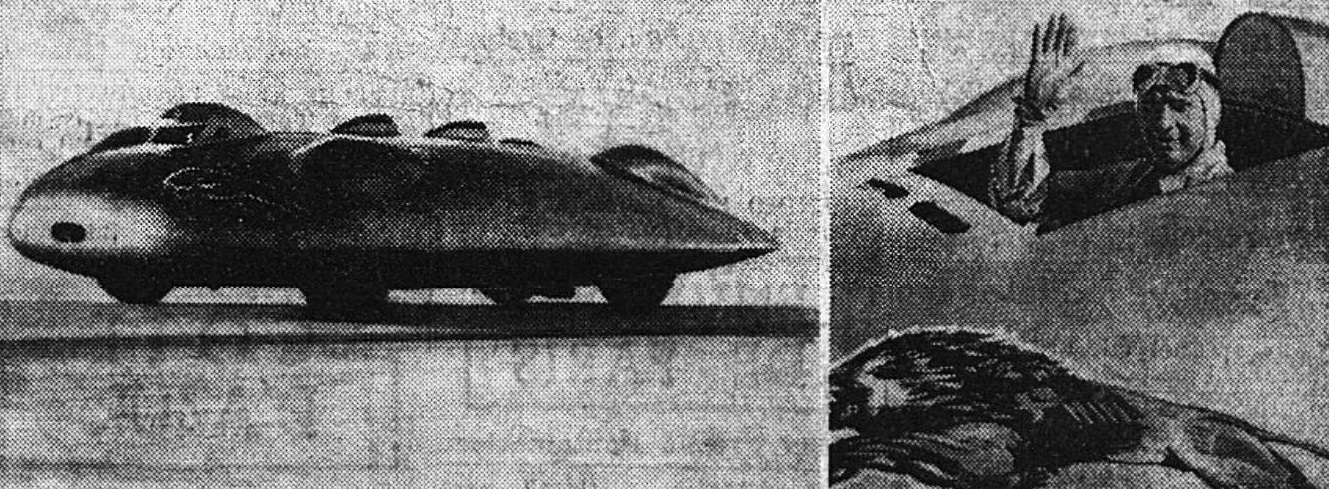
The Railton Special and John Cobb in the cockpit

Driving the piston-engined, wheel-driven Railton Special, he also broke the World Land Speed Record at Bonneville salt flats on 15 September 1938 by achieving 350 miles per hour. He broke it a second time at the same site on 23 August 1939, achieving 369 miles per hour.

Cobb was inducted into the Motorsports Hall of Fame of America in 2021 for all his achievements in motorsports.

== War service ==
During World War II, Cobb served as an officer in the Royal Air Force, and between 1943 and 1945 served with the Air Transport Auxiliary, being demobilised with the rank of Squadron Leader. He made an (uncredited) appearance in the wartime propaganda film Target for Tonight (1941).

== Post-war speed record career and death ==
Cobb returned to Bonneville salt flats again in 1947, where on 16 September he beat his own standing 1939 World Land Speed Record by reaching 394.19 miles per hour (634.39 km/h) (on one of the two runs he was clocked at having reached 403 miles per hour (649 km/h)), earning him the press moniker "The Fastest Man Alive". This record remained in place until 1963, when it was surpassed by the American Craig Breedlove.

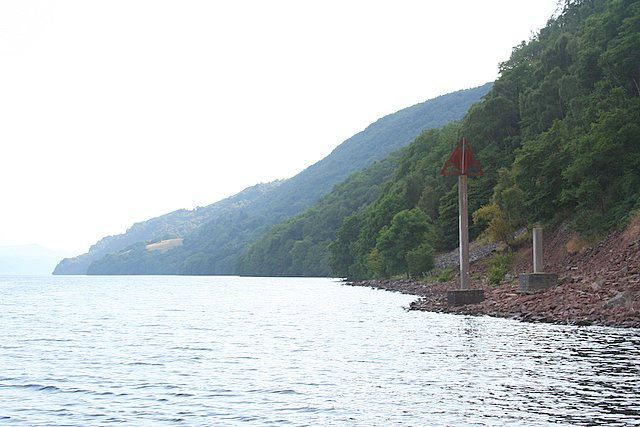
Start of John Cobb's measured mile where he lost his life

After the 1947 achievement, Cobb turned his mind to becoming on water what he now was on land and went after the simultaneous World Water Speed Record. He commissioned from Vospers the jet-engine powered speedboat Crusader and selected the long water loch of Loch Ness in Scotland for the speed trial. On 29 September 1952 he was killed at the age of 52 whilst attempting to break the world Water Speed Record at Loch Ness whilst piloting Crusader at a speed in excess of 200 mph (320 km/h). During the run the boat lost stability and disintegrated about Cobb. After extensively studying footage of the crash, Reid Railton, the designer of the boat, concluded the crash was caused by an undamped oscillation which caused a loss of control authority. Cobb's body, which had been thrown 50 yards (46 m) beyond the wreckage, was recovered from the loch, and subsequently conveyed back to his home county of Surrey, where it was buried in the graveyard of Christ Church, Esher. A memorial was subsequently erected on the Loch Ness shore to his memory by the townsfolk of Glenurquhart.

In 2002 the remains of the jet engine speedboat Crusader were located on the bed of Loch Ness at a depth of 200 metres (656 ft) and the site was designated as a scheduled monument in 2005. The wreck was filmed by a research team from National Geographic in 2019.

== Personal life ==
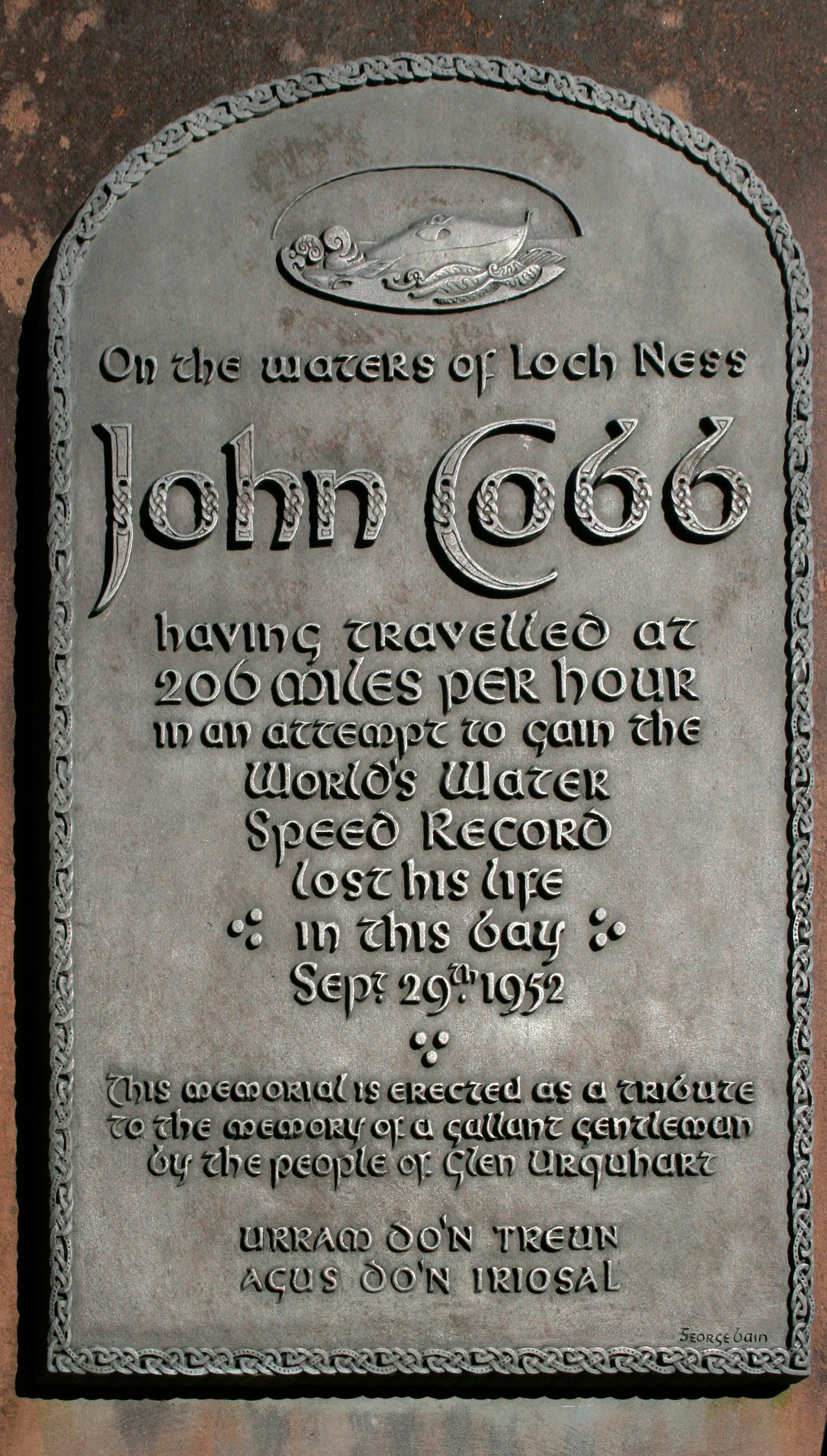
The memorial to John Cobb

John Cobb married Elizabeth Mitchell-Smith in 1947. Elizabeth died from Bright's Disease 14 months later. In 1950 he married Vera Victoria Henderson (1917–2007).

Cobb's parental home was 'The Grove' in Esher, an 18th-century mansion, which was demolished in the late 20th century for building development. A public green in Esher (located at 51.37933 -0.36472) was named 'Cobb Green' in tribute to his achievements. In 2013 an archaeological excavation of meadowland at Arran Way at Esher's Lower Green uncovered the foundations of The Grove. In 2017 a Blue plaque was unveiled by Richard Noble to Cobb's memory at the newly re-built Cranmere Primary School which partially occupies the site of the former Grove House estate.

== Awards ==
- British Empire Trophy (1932).
- Segrave Trophy (1947).
- Queen's Commendation for Brave Conduct (1953).
