= 1929 24 Hours of Le Mans =

7th 24 Hours of Le Mans endurance race

| Previous: 1928 | Next: 1930 |
Index: Races | Winners

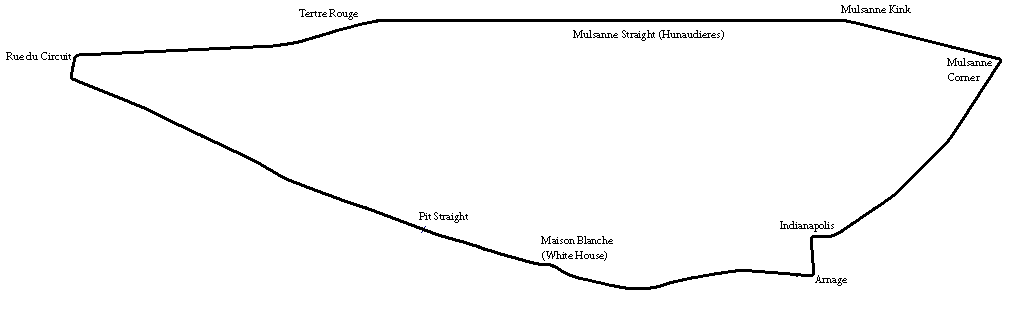
The new 1929 circuit

The 1929 24 Hours of Le Mans was the 7th Grand Prix of Endurance that took place at the Circuit de la Sarthe on 15 and 16 June 1929.

In the most dominant display in the race to date, Bentley achieved a comprehensive victory taking the first four places on distance. Bentley director Woolf Barnato repeated his victory of the previous year, co-driven this time by fellow Bentley Boy Sir Henry “Tim” Birkin. They had led from start to finish, setting a new distance record and lap record.

The race was relatively quiet, without serious incident, aside from a fuel fire burning Stutz driver Édouard Brisson. Half of the reduced field had retired by dawn on the Sunday and the Bentley team was able to stage a formation finish for its four finishers.

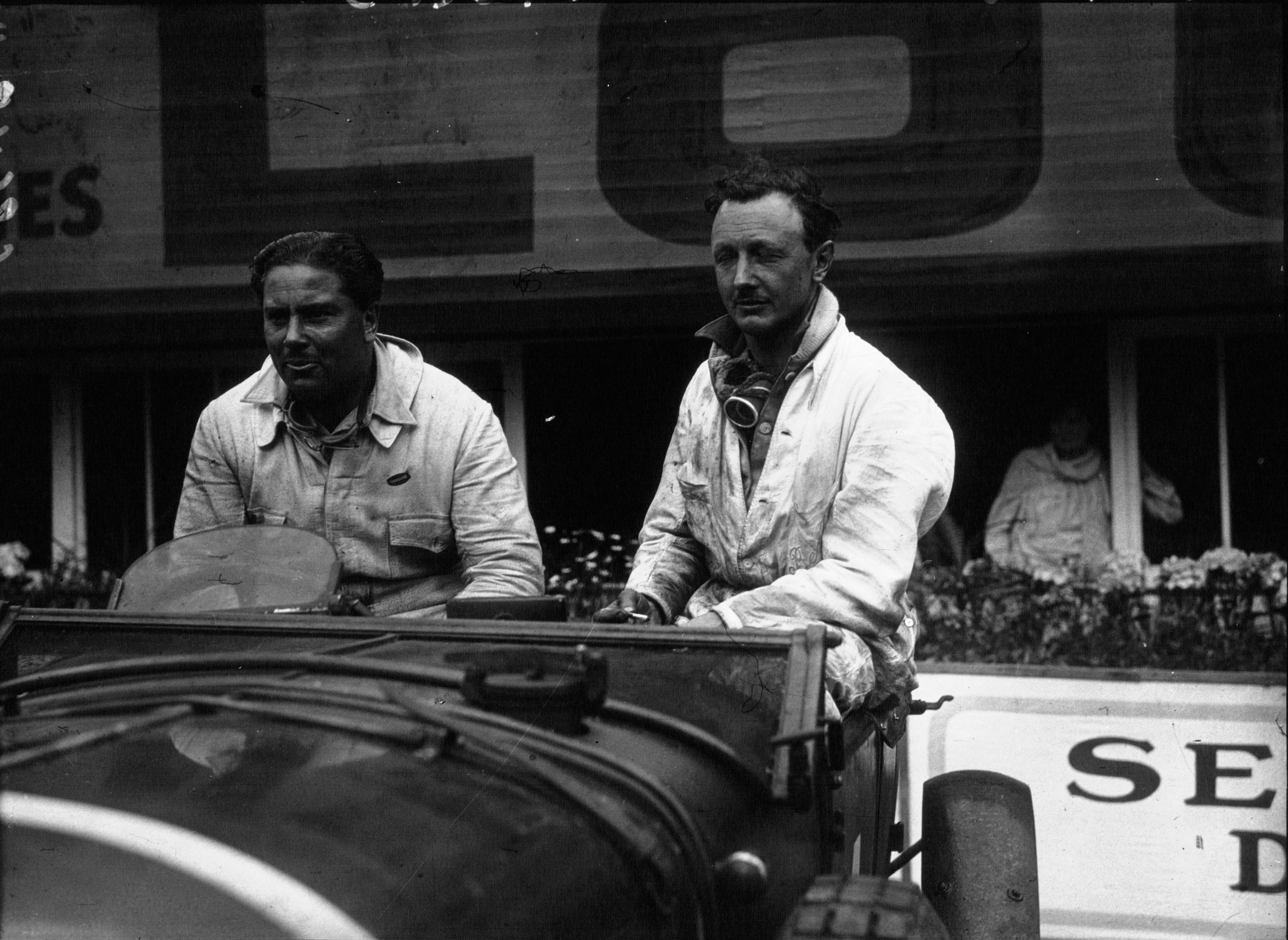
Winners Woolf Barnato and Henry Birkin after the race

== Regulations ==
The international regulations remained unchanged. However, for its part, the Automobile Club de l'Ouest (ACO) decreed that 2-seater cars could now be no bigger than 1000cc (either supercharged or not) and the 3-seat dispensation for 1500cc cars was removed after two years. This year Shell petrol was the official fuel for all cars.

Residents of southern Le Mans city were successful in petitioning the council. A new by-pass road, the Rue de Circuit, was built 600 metres ahead of the Pontlieue hairpin at the edge of the city. It reduced the track length by 922 metres from 17.362 km (10.788 mi) to 16.340 km (10.153 mi).

The road surface experiments continued on the track. The left-hand turn approaching Arnage was partially re-surfaced with bricks and named Indianapolis, after the famous American “Brickyard”. A new spectator area was opened between the two corners. Also, many roadside trees had their trunks painted white for visibility and all the corners were signposted.

The media centre was also enlarged to include six phone booths and a telegraph table.

== Entries ==
The global recession was hitting the auto-industry hard and only 26 cars made it to the start-line. For the first time French cars were in the minority with none in line for outright distance honours. It became a three-nation entry list with cars only from France, Great Britain and the United States. In lieu of a lack of direct manufacturer support, more privateer entries arrived. Supercharged engines were very popular with ten cars having ‘blown’ engines. Dunlop Tyres now shod all the cars in the field. Of the sixteen places open in the Biennial Cup final, thirteen were taken up.

| Category | Entries | Classes |
|---|---|---|
| Large-sized engines | 14 / 12 | over 2-litre |
| Medium-sized engines | 12 / 11 | 1.1 to 2-litre |
| Small-sized engines | 4 / 3 | up to 1.1-litre |
| Total entrants | 30 / 26 | |

- Note: The first number is the number of entries, the second the number who started.

Belying its precarious financial position, defending winners Bentley arrived with a very strong five-car entry, led by the new Speed Six sport version of its 6½-litre tourer. The engine was developed by Harry Weslake using a magnesium-alloy (elektron) crankcase to reduce weight. It put out over 190 bhp and get to 185 kp/h (115 mph). The previous year's winner, and company director, Woolf Barnato would drive it with Henry “Tim” Birkin. Another Le Mans winner, Dudley Benjafield, was slated to drive the car, but he gave his place to Birkin believing he would have a better chance of winning.

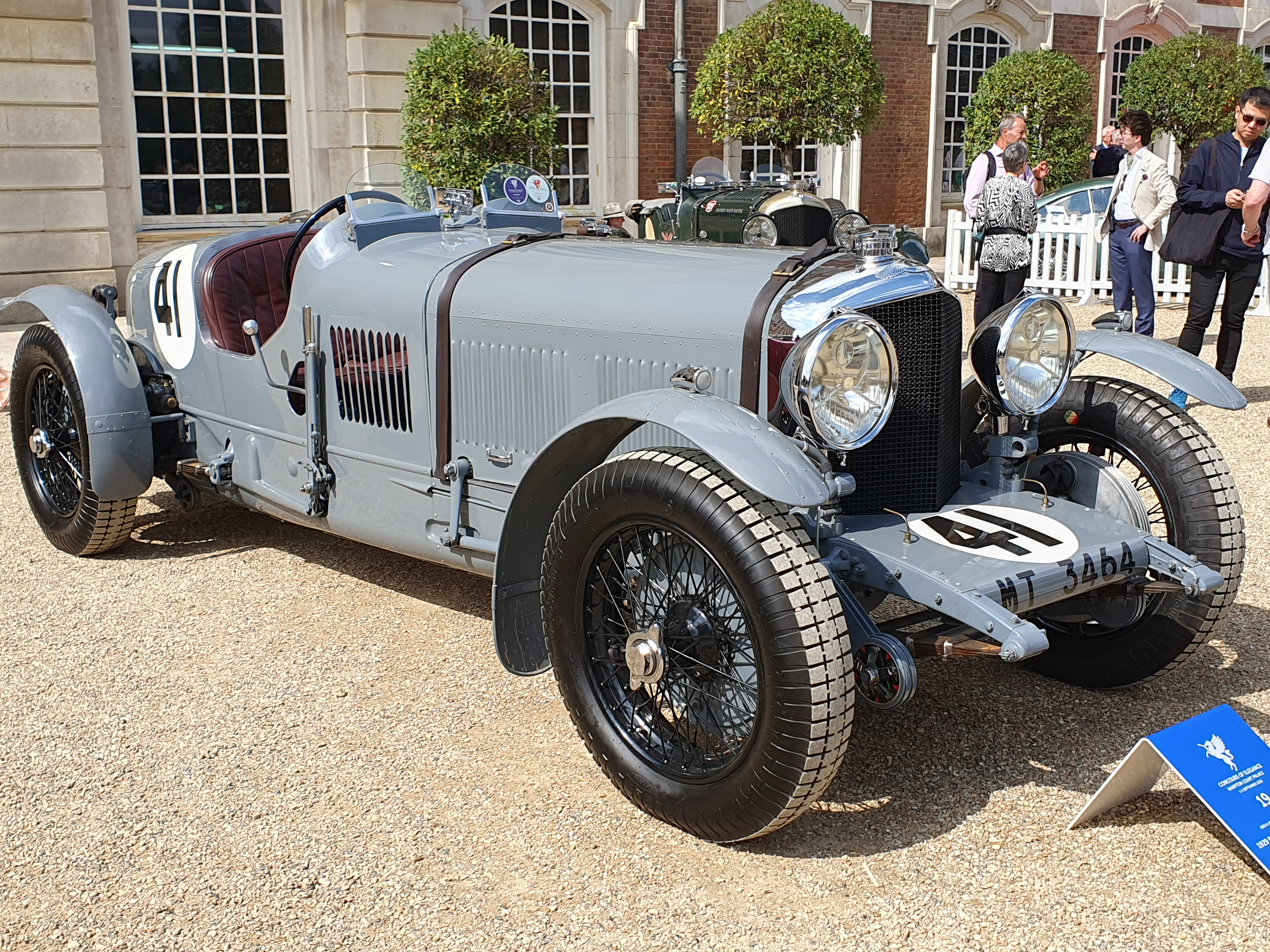
Bentley Speed Six "Old Number One", MT3464 seen at Hampton Court in 2023

The remaining four cars were the reliable 4½-litre tourers, the chassis strengthened after the issues from the previous year. They were assigned to more of the “Bentley Boys”: Frank Clement / Jean Chassagne, Benjafield with Baron André d’Erlanger and Glen Kidston/Jack Dunfee. The fourth car, of Earl Howe/Bernard Rubin, had only a week earlier been used in a 24-hour record-breaking attempt at Montlhéry by Mary Petre and her husband Victor Bruce. The experienced driving squad was supported by Bertie Kensington-Moir, back from Lagonda as team manager, and Walter Hassan as lead mechanic.

After the close-fought duel the previous year, Stutz returned with three cars. The new Model M Blackhawk had a 5.3-litre engine capable of 155 bhp through a four-speed gearbox. The cars were entered by their European dealerships. British agent Warwick Wright had George Eyston/Dick Watney as drivers. Automobiles Elite, of Paris, hired Guy Bouriat and Philippe de Rothschild; while Paris-based American Charles Terres Weymann had grand-prix master Louis Chiron with the experienced Édouard Brisson. Their car was fitted with an optional Roots-supercharger.

Like Stutz, Du Pont was in the American luxury car market. The new Model G had a big 5.3-litre Continental sidevalve engine. However, this was a two-seater tourer, and refused entry by the ACO under its new maximum engine-size rule. So, the company quickly fashioned four four-seater speedster models, however only one of the two entries was ready in time for the race. It would be driven by the first Americans at Le Mans – Charles Moran Jr. (a friend of E. Paul du Pont, who had raced in Europe the previous year) and Alfredo Luis Miranda (the Mexican-born New York dealer for DuPont).

Once again, the Grand Garage St Didier entered two of their Chrysler Six's. The ‘75’ was the 1929 model, driven by team regular Henri Stoffel, this time along with French GP racer Robert Benoist. The ‘77’ was a preview of the 1930 model and manned by Cyril de Vere and Marcel Mongin.

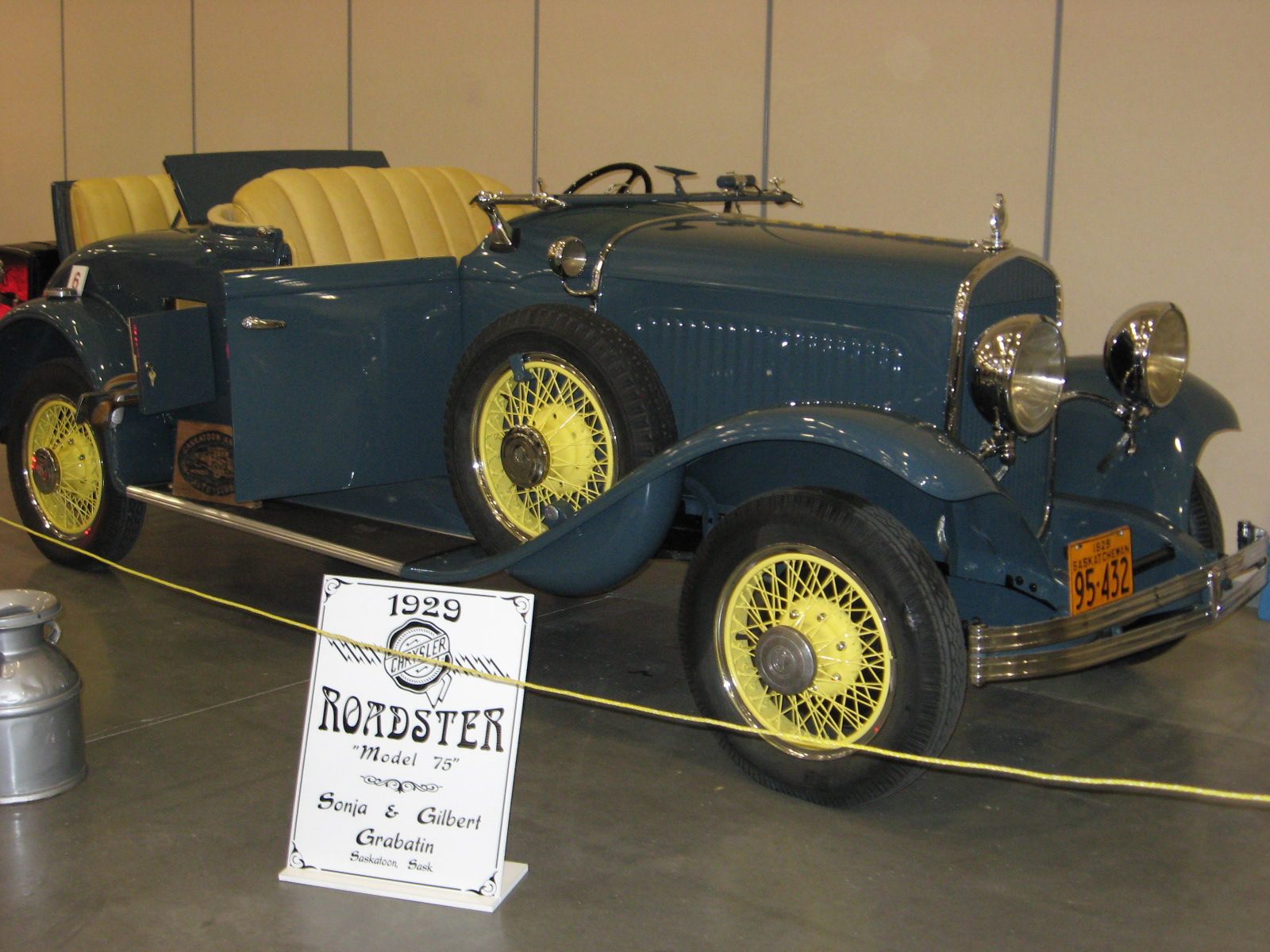
1929 Chrysler Six

Invicta was an English firm founded in 1919. Offering a standard design in three wheelbase lengths, the 1928 LC (“large-chassis”) version featured the current 4.5-litre Meadows engine that put out 100 bhp. Cecil Twisleton-Wykeham-Fiennes, a major in the Royal Marines, put in a privateer entry for the race.

Similarly, Lea-Francis was an English firm manufacturing since 1920. The S-Type had arrived in 1927, with the Meadows 1.5-litre engine used in several English sports cars. Once fitted with a supercharger (as the S-Type Hyper) it could reach 145 kp/h (90 mph) and became very popular with privateer drivers and Kaye Don won the RAC Tourist Trophy handicap. Enthused by this, gentleman racer Ken Peacock entered a car with Lea-Francis distributor Sammy Newsome as his co-pilot.

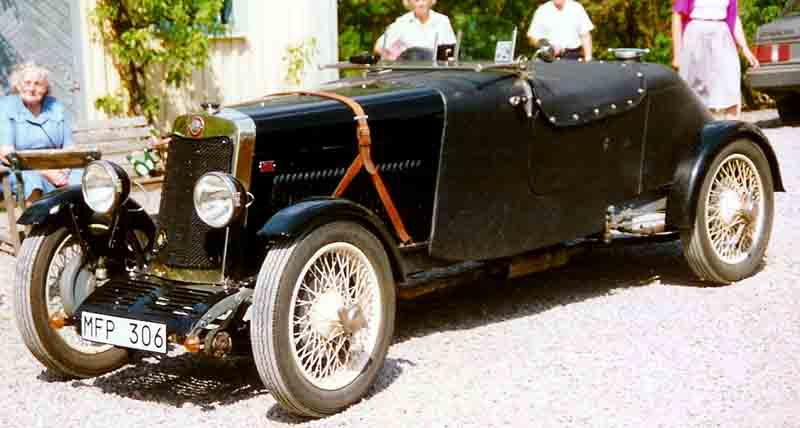
Lea-Francis S-Type Hyper

The Lagonda works team had had a very disappointing season in 1928, with only one finish from seven entries in three races. However, a new team of Lagonda-owners (PERR) and the company's main agents, Fox & Nichol, approached the company to prepare four cars for racing. Major revisions were made to the 2-Litre Speed, including lowering the chassis, uprating the engine and fitting a tougher gearbox and suspension, all combining to give it a top speed of 160 kp/h (100 mph). One was entered for Le Mans, driven by Tim Rose-Richards and Brian Lewis, Baron Essendon. By contrast, the Alvis had been successful and returned with two of their new FA8/15 model. Still with front-wheel drive, the 1.5-litre engine now had a Roots supercharger. Drivers were 1927-winner and journalist Sammy Davis with Leon Cushman and Cyril Paul with Bill Urquhart-Dykes.

SARA was the only other manufacturer apart from Bentley to have been at every Le Mans to date. Since the last race founder Auguste Tisserant had sold the license for his patented air-cooled pushrod engine to Scottish entrepreneur H.E. Plaister's new company Scotsman Motors who intended to manufacture touring cars around the 1.5 and 1.8-litre engines. In a joint-venture the companies entered a pair of four-year-old SARA SP-7s for SARA works driver Gaston Mottet along with three British drivers.

The success of Tracta’s patented front-wheel drive system had attracted considerable investment from Charles Terres Weymann, which helped to allow the team to enter four cars to the race. The new regulations meant their two-seater Type A could only have a 1-litre engine, but each SCAP engine was fitted with a Cozette supercharger. Once again, owner Jean-Albert Grégoire drove one of his cars. Lucien Lemesle, the mechanic in the crowd who had volunteered to help Grégoire in the debacle that was their 1927 race, returned as a co-driver to Maurice Benoist. The fourth car was a streamliner special. The unique Cozette engine had opposed pistons at each end of the cylinders powered by the supercharger pressure, thus dispensing with a cylinder head and crankcase. Grégoire prudently assigned his head mechanic Tribaudot, who had assembled the engine, to co-drive Roger Bourcier (given the rule that only the drivers could work on the car during the race). Its distinctive engine easily made it the loudest, and smokiest, car in the race.

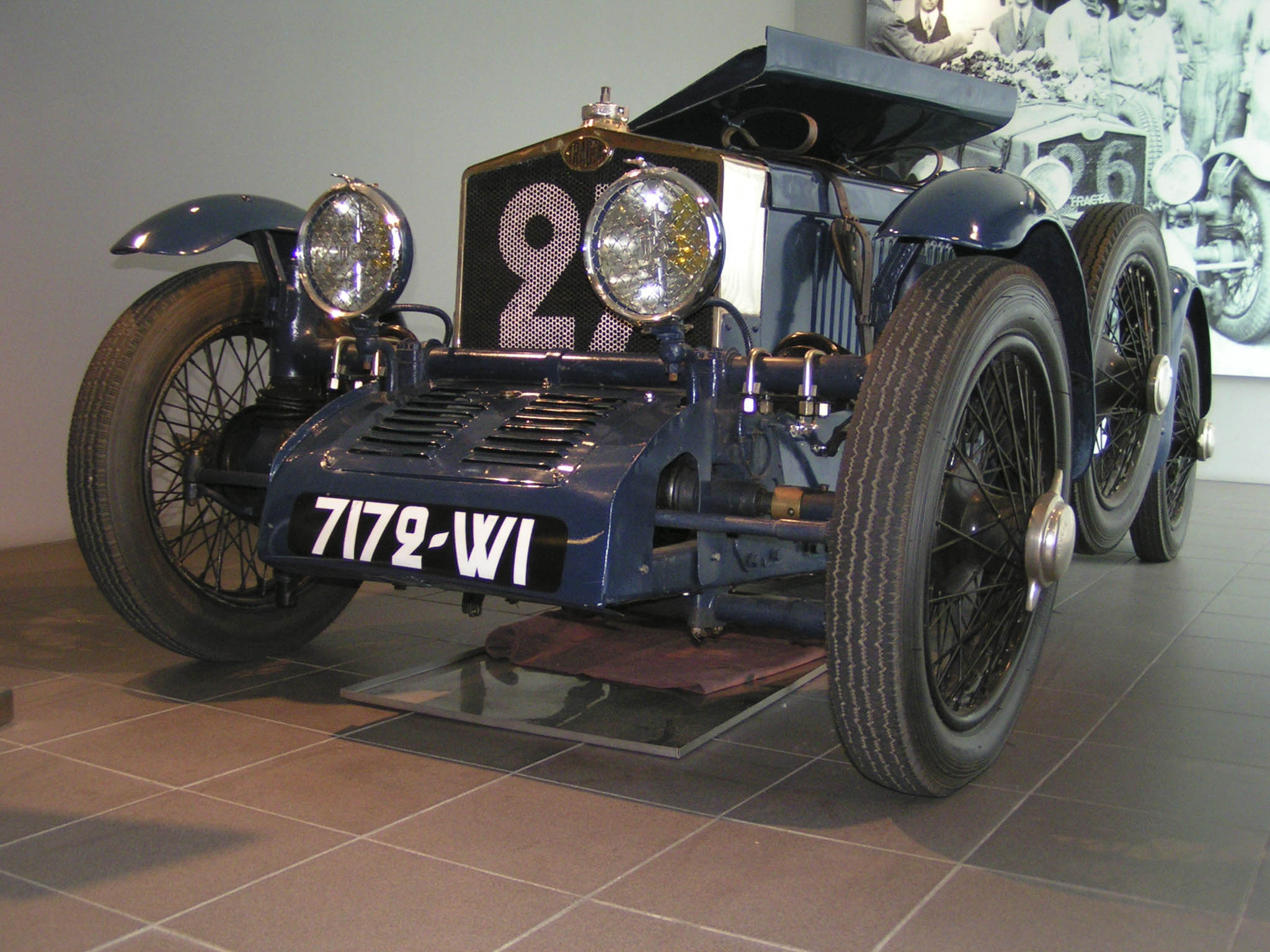
Tracta Type A

Bollack Netter and Co (BNC) had collapsed and been bought out by entrepreneur Charles de Ricou, who would also buy the struggling Rolland Pilain and Lombard companies. Two new models came to Le Mans: the four-seater Acacias, with a supercharged 1.5-litre Meadows engine, and a pair of the BNC 527, with its small 1-litre Ruby engine. One of those was also took the entry in the Biennial Cup.

Smallest car in the field was the D’Yrsan Grand Sport. After withdrawing its entries for the 1928 race, the company arrived this year. The low-slung car had a patented independent front suspension and ran with a supercharged 749cc Ruby engine. A normally-aspirated 1.1-litre entry was also submitted, but later withdrawn.

== Practice ==
The British teams got to the track at the start of the week, to familiarise themselves with the circuit and the new layout in unofficial practices (with the roads still for public use). After testing and a shake-down run for the DuPont at the Montlhéry circuit, Moran was concerned about Miranda's lack of pace and decided to drive the whole event himself.

== Race ==
=== Start ===
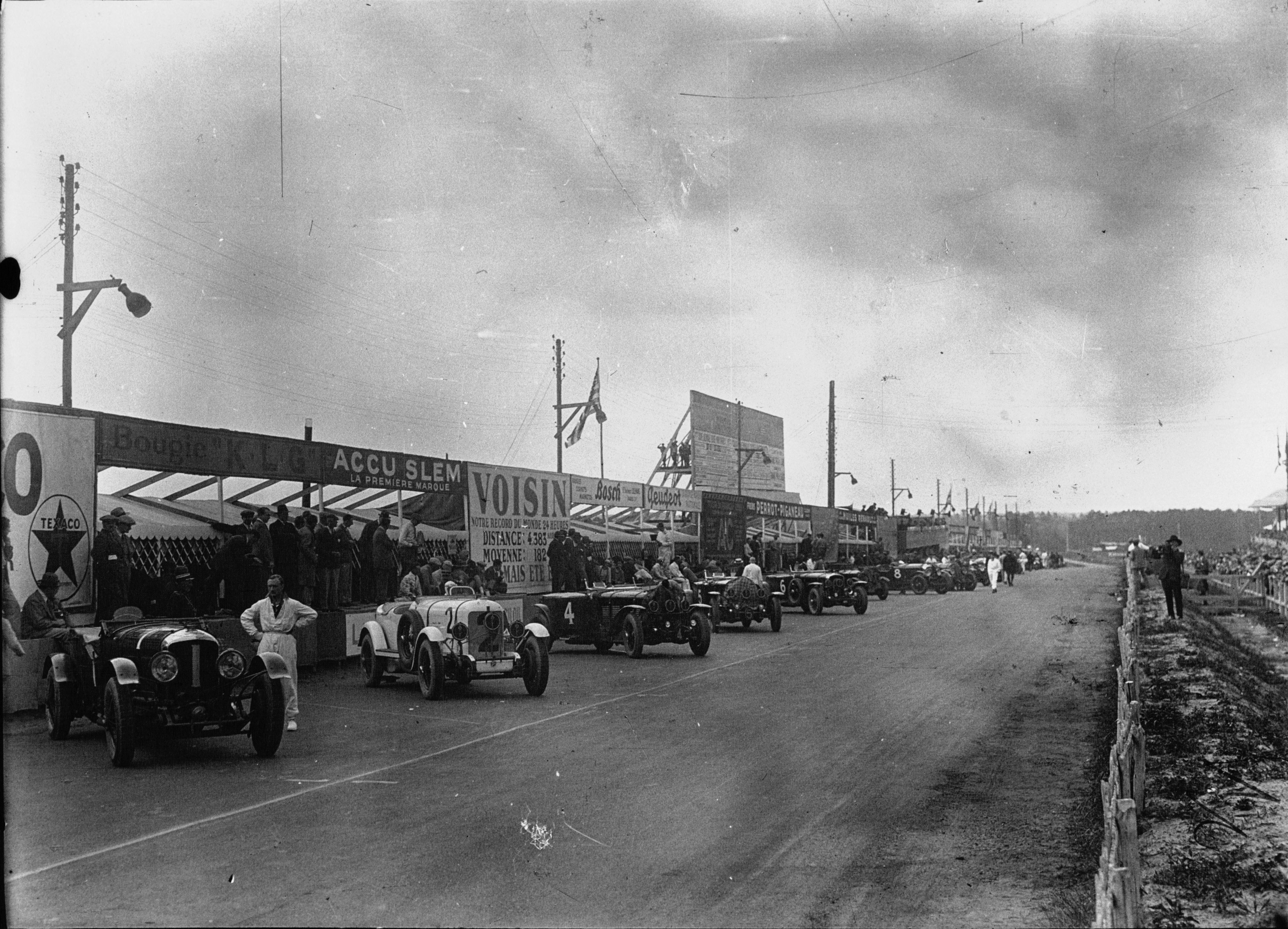
Grid at the start of the race

Once again, the race began under grey clouds and drizzling rain. First away were the DuPont and the Lagonda but Birkin, in the big Bentley Speed Six, was in the lead under the Dunlop bridge. Left at the line was the D’Yrsan with Trillaud losing seven minutes pushing the car up the road trying to get his engine fired (technically a disqualification offense). At the end of the first lap Birkin had already set a new lap record of 7m57s, from a standing start. The other Bentleys of Clement, Kidston and Benjafield were in formation behind, chased by the Stutzes of Bouriat and Eyston. Howe was next, though he soon moved up as the rain stopped to join his teammates, with Benoist and Mongin in their Chryslers and Moran's DuPont making up the top ten. Already there was a sizeable gap (over a kilometre) back to the Lagonda leading the smaller cars.

After three-quarters of an hour, Earl Howe was in the pits, his progress stymied by electrical issues. Replacing the sparkplugs and the magneto took an hour but was ultimately unsuccessful. The DuPont retired with a bent propshaft badly affecting its handling. Unlike most other teams who now used secured lead weights, the team had loaded their ballast as sandbags. These had broken through the floor and damaged the propshaft. With their twenty lap minimum done, the other cars started making their first pit stops for driver changes and refuelling. The well-drilled Bentley drivers were in and out in 3minutes. Alarmingly, fuel spilled onto the hot exhaust of Brisson's Stutz which quickly burst into flames. Brisson was burnt and had to be taken to hospital. After extended repairs to the car, Grand Prix driver Louis Chiron resolved to carry on driving solo.

Overtaken by the Alvis, the Lagonda was still going well until Lewis bought the car into the pits, saying the floorboards has been on fire. Initially thought it was thought a hot exhaust pipe had got bent, but when it was found to have a leak from a head gasket the team's race was over. In the meantime, the Alvis had also been put out, with a cracked cylinder head.

By 10pm as night fell, Barnato and Dunfee, having completed 44 laps, now had a lap's lead on the rest of the field. The remaining two Bentleys were next, themselves with a lap over Bouriat's Stutz (42) and with Eyston's Stutz and the Chryslers a further lap back (41).

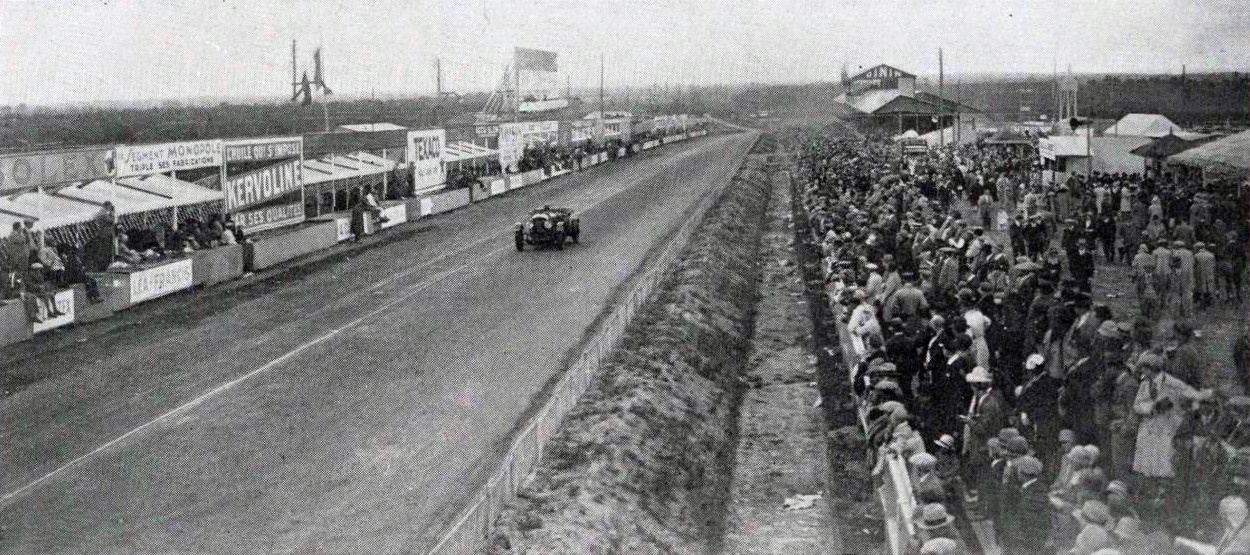
Bentley #10 on the main straight

=== Night ===
Through the night, the Bentley team kept building their lead. Dunfee lost second place when he had to pit to replace his lightbulbs, which had burnt out their wiring while he was doing 100mph down the Mulsanne Straight. He was livid when he found out the mechanics had installed bigger replacement bulbs for the event. Stoffel started pushing his Chrysler when he took over at 2am, making up ground with his track experience. Then around 3am the Benjafield/d'Erlanger car, running fourth, got a water leak and electrical fault. By the time the niggly faults were repaired, they were being closely pursued by a resurgent Bouriat and Benoist. Then Benoist's skill as a Grand Prix driver came to the fore in the darkness as he successively overtook the Stutz and the Bentley to push up to fourth by 6am. Just before halftime the Tracta special – which had been in danger of disqualification as a driving hazard because of its excessive exhaust – broke a fuel line and retired. The Invicta, that had been running as high as 9th at nightfall, was retired when a complete loss of engine-oil had broken a big-end bearing. They had been “the best of the rest”, leading the Lea-Francis, a Tracta, BNC and SARA. Around dawn Clement's Bentley had to stop when the rear ballast came loose and went through the floorboards, damaging the suspension. He lost an hour undertaking repair.

=== Morning ===
So, as the spectators were rousing for breakfast, there were only a dozen cars left running. Barnato and Birkin were still running smoothly out in front. Kidston and Dunfee were now only a lap ahead of the Benoist/Stoffel Chrysler. Behind were the two delayed Bentleys and the two Stutzes. Chiron's solo-drive through the night had finally come to an end just after dawn when the clutch gave out. Then at 7 am, Eyston's Stutz ran out of fuel out on the track (with just a lap before his next pit-stop) because of a split fuel tank, leaving just one Stutz in the running.

A similar malady then forced the Chrysler to pit. Stoffel was under his car for nearly two hours doing extended repairs. That restored the Bentleys to the top four positions. The Lea-Francis had moved up the order through the night to eighth and was running well when one of the shock-absorbers broke. Despite a rough ride they made it to the finish.

=== Finish and post-race ===
From there it was a routine run to the finish. With over 700 km (430 mi) spreading the small field, the only real point of excitement was the Chrysler trying hard to reel in the Stutz to take fifth place. In the last hour, W. O. Bentley put the word out to his team to line up for a formation finish. Quite a novelty at the time, the “Motor” magazine described it as “superb, disposed in line ahead like a squadron of battleships.”

Bouriat/Rothschild bought the Stutz home in fifth, barely a lap ahead of the hard-charging Benoist in his Chrysler, with his teammate three laps further back. Ken Peacock's privateer Lea-Francis was the first smaller-engined car, in eighth, with two of the Tractas rounding out the ten finishers. Team-owner Grégoire almost had a race-ending spin at Arnage near the end of the race, but they were the only French cars to finish this year.

It was the most dominant display by a manufacturer in the short history of the race to date, and not matched until 1957 by Jaguar. The leading two Bentleys had not missed a beat. In the mighty Speed Six, Tim Birkin had stamped an impressive new lap record, fully 46 seconds faster, helped by the slightly abbreviated track layout. They also broke the race distance record, covering over 2,800 km (1,700 mi). The Speed Six's performance was so strong that they also won all three major awards, becoming the biggest car to win the Index.

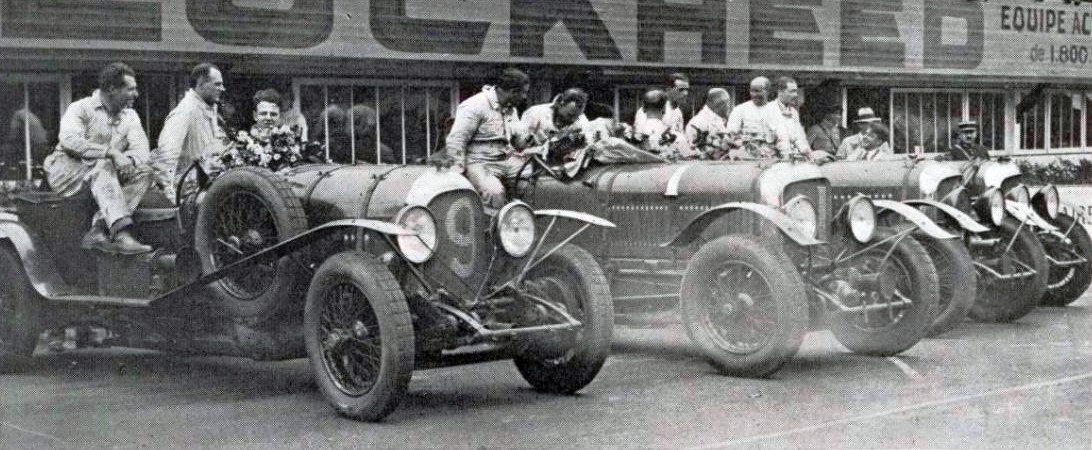
The four Bentley finishers lined up, the winning #1 second from left

In finishing fourth, Frank Clement has the distinction of being the only driver to have participated in all seven of the Le Mans through the 1920s, all for Bentley and including the distance victory in 1924. Feeling very pleased with his consecutive victories, Barnato loaned Bentley another £25000.

In August, the innovative supercharging pioneer René Cozette was killed making a speed-record attempt when he crashed at 200 kp/h at Montlhéry. In November, Kidston was badly burned when he was the sole survivor in an air-crash in England of a Luft Hansa passenger flight.

== Official results ==
=== Finishers ===
Results taken from Quentin Spurring's book, officially licensed by the ACO Although there were no official engine classes, the highest finishers in unofficial categories aligned with the Index targets are in Bold text.

| Pos | Class ** | No. | Team | Drivers | Chassis | Engine | Tyre | Target distance* | Laps |
|---|---|---|---|---|---|---|---|---|---|
| 1 | **8.0** | **1** | **(United Kingdom) Bentley Motors Ltd** | **(United Kingdom) Woolf Barnato** **(United Kingdom) Sir Henry “Tim” Birkin** | Bentley Speed Six | Bentley 6.6L S6 | D | 137 [B] | 174 |
| 2 | **5.0** | **9** | **(United Kingdom) Bentley Motors Ltd** | **(United Kingdom) Glen Kidston** **(United Kingdom) Jack Dunfee** | Bentley 4½ Litre | Bentley 4.4L S4 | D | 135 | 167 |
| 3 | 5.0 | 10 | (United Kingdom) Bentley Motors Ltd | (United Kingdom) Dr Dudley Benjafield (France) Baron André d'Erlanger | Bentley 4½ Litre | Bentley 4.4L S4 | D | 135 [B] | 159 |
| 4 | 5.0 | 8 | (United Kingdom) Bentley Motors Ltd | (United Kingdom) Frank Clement (France) Jean Chassagne | Bentley 4½ Litre | Bentley 4.4L S4 | D | 135 | 157 |
| 5 | 8.0 | 5 | (France) Automobiles Elite Paris | (France) Guy Bouriat (France) Philippe de Rothschild | Stutz Model M Blackhawk | Stutz 5.3L S8 supercharged | D | 136 | 153 |
| 6 | 5.0 | 14 | (France) Grand Garage Saint-Didier Paris | (France) Robert Benoist (France) Henri Stoffel | Chrysler Six Series 75 | Chrysler 4.1L S6 | D | 134 [B] | 152 |
| 7 | 5.0 | 12 | (France) Grand Garage Saint-Didier Paris | (France) Cyril de Vere (France) Marcel Mongin | Chrysler Six Series 77 | Chrysler 4.1L S6 | D | 134 [B] | 149 |
| 8 | **1.5** | **21** | **(United Kingdom) K.S. Peacock** (private entrant) | **(United Kingdom) Kenneth Peacock** **(United Kingdom) Sammy Newsome** | Lea-Francis S-Type Hyper | Meadows 1495cc S4 supercharged | D | 128 | 136 |
| 9 | **1.1** | **26** | **(France) SA des Automobiles Tracta** | **(France) Louis Balart** **(France) Louis Debeugny** | Tracta Type A | S.C.A.P. 985cc S4 supercharged | D | 116 [B] | 128 |
| 10 | 1.1 | 27 | (France) SA des Automobiles Tracta | (France) Jean-Albert Grégoire (France) Fernand Vallon | Tracta Type A | S.C.A.P. 985cc S4 supercharged | D | 116 [B] | 126 |

=== Did not finish ===
| Pos | Class ** | No | Team | Drivers | Chassis | Engine | Tyre | Target distance* | Laps | Reason |
|---|---|---|---|---|---|---|---|---|---|---|
| DNF | 8.0 | 6 | (United Kingdom) Col Warwick Wright (private entrant) | (United Kingdom) Capt George Eyston (United Kingdom) Dick Watney | Stutz Model M Blackhawk | Stutz 5.3L S8 supercharged | D | 136 [B] | 104 | Fuel tank (15 hr) |
| DNF | 1.5 | 20 | (France) Bollack, Netter et Cie | (France) Lucien Desvaux (France) Auguste Garalp | B.N.C. Acacias | Meadows 1496cc S4 supercharged | D | 128 | 88 | Transmission (17 hr) |
| DNF | 5.0 | 7 | (United Kingdom) C.W. Fiennes (private entrant) | (United Kingdom) Maj Cecil Twisleton-Wykeham-Fiennes (United Kingdom) Arthur Owen Saunders-Davies | Invicta LC 4½ Litre | Meadows 4.5L S6 | D | 135 | 78 | Engine (12 hr) |
| DNF | 2.0 | 19 | (France) Société des Applications à Refroidissements par Air | (United Kingdom) W.R. Hutchinson (United Kingdom) R.F. Turner | S.A.R.A. SP7 | S.A.R.A. 1806cc S6 | D | 127 | 73 | ? (13 hr) |
| DNF | 1.1 | 25 | (France) SA des Automobiles Tracta | (France) Maurice Benoist (France) Lucien Lemesle | Tracta Type A | S.C.A.P. 993cc S4 supercharged | D | 116 | 70 | Electrics (8 hr) |
| DNF | 8.0 | 4 | (France) Société de Carrosserie; Weymann | (France) Édouard Brisson (Monaco) Louis Chiron | Stutz Model M Blackhawk | Stutz 5.3L S8 supercharged | D | 137 | 65 | Fire/clutch (13 hr) |
| DNF | 1.1 | 24 | (France) SA des Automobiles Tracta | (France) Roger Bourcier (France) . Tribaudot | Tracta Spéciale | Cozette 999cc S4 (2-Stroke) supercharged | D | 119 [B] | 43 | Engine (12 hr) |
| DNF | 2.0 | 16 | (United Kingdom) Fox & Nicholl / PERR | (United Kingdom) Tim Rose-Richards (United Kingdom) Brian Lewis, Baron Essendon | Lagonda 2 Litre Speed | Lagonda 1954cc S4 | D | 128 [B] | 29 | Engine/Fire (6 hr) |
| DNF | 1.1 | 29 | (France) Bollack, Netter et Cie | (France) Jean Lajeune (France) Maurice Faure | B.N.C. Type 527 | Ruby 995cc S4 | D | 117 | 24 | Engine (5 hr) |
| DNF | 2.0 | 18 | (France) Société des Applications à Refroidissements par Air | (France) Gaston Mottet (United Kingdom) Douglas Hawkes | S.A.R.A. SP7 | S.A.R.A. 1806cc S6 | D | 127 | 22 | Engine (7 hr) |
| DNF | 1.5 | 22 | (United Kingdom) Alvis Car and Engineering Co | (United Kingdom) Cyril Paul (United Kingdom) Bill Urquhart-Dykes | Alvis FA8/15 | Alvis 1484cc S4 supercharged | D | 128 [B] | 21 | Engine (3 hr) |
| DNF | 8.0 | 2 | (United States) Du Pont Motor Co. | (United States) Charles Moran Jr. (United States) Alfredo Miranda Jr | Du Pont Model G Speedster | Continental 5.3L S8 | D | 136 | 20 | Transmission (2 hr) |
| DNF | 1.1 | 30 | (France) Bollack, Netter et Cie | (France) Michel Doré (France) Jean Treunet | B.N.C. Type 527 | Ruby 995cc S4 | D | 117 [B] | 15 | Engine (4 hr) |
| DNF | 750 | 31 | (France) Cyclecars D’Yrsan | (France) . Trillaud (France) Henri Lachner | D’Yrsan Grand Sport | Ruby 749cc S4 | D | 108 | 9 | Engine (2 hr) |
| DNF | 5.0 | 11 | (United Kingdom) Bentley Motors Ltd | (Australia) Bernard Rubin (United Kingdom) Francis Curzon, Earl Howe | Bentley 4½ Litre | Bentley 4.4L S4 | D | 135 | 7 | Electrics (3 hr) |
Sources:

- Note *: [B]= car also entered in the 1928-9 Biennial Cup.
- Note **: There were no official class divisions for this race. These are unofficial categories (used in subsequent years) related to the Index targets.

=== Did not start ===
| Pos | Class | No | Team | Drivers | Chassis | Engine | Reason |
|---|---|---|---|---|---|---|---|
| DNS | 1.5 | 23 | (United Kingdom) Alvis Car and Engineering Company | (United Kingdom) Sammy Davis (United Kingdom) Leon Cushman | Alvis FA8/15 | Alvis 1484cc S4 supercharged | Engine [B] |
| DNA | 8.0 | 3 | (United States) Du Pont Motor Co. | (Australia) Sidney Cotton (Australia) Millicent Cotton | Du Pont Model G Speedster | Continental 5.3L S8 | Did not arrive |
| DNA | 4.0 | 15 | (France) Compagnie Maryland Paris | | Oakland All-American Six | Oakland 3.5L S6 | Did not arrive |
| DNA | 2.0 | 17 | (United Kingdom) Fox & Nicholl / PERR | | Lagonda 2 Litre Speed | Lagonda 1954cc S4 | Did not arrive |
| DNA | 1.1 | 28 | (France) Cyclecars D’Yrsan | | D’Yrsan Grand Sport | Ruby 1097cc S4 | Did not arrive |

=== 1928-29 Coupe Biennale Rudge-Whitworth ===
| Pos | Class | No. | Team | Drivers | Chassis | 1929 Index Result |
|---|---|---|---|---|---|---|
| 1 | 8.0 | 1 | (United Kingdom) Bentley Motors Ltd | (United Kingdom) Woolf Barnato (United Kingdom) Henry “Tim” Birkin | Bentley Speed Six | 1.270 |
| 2 | 5.0 | 10 | (United Kingdom) Bentley Motors Ltd | (United Kingdom) Dr Dudley Benjafield (France) Baron André d'Erlanger | Bentley 4½ Litre | 1.177 |
| 3 | 5.0 | 14 | (France) Grand Garage Saint-Didier Paris | (France) Robert Benoist (France) Henri Stoffel | Chrysler Six Series 75 | 1.134 |
| 4 | 5.0 | 12 | (France) Grand Garage Saint-Didier Paris | (France) Cyril de Vere (France) Marcel Mongin | Chrysler Six Series 77 | 1.112 |
| 5 | 1.1 | 26 | (France) SA des Automobiles Tracta | (France) Louis Balart (France) Louis Debeugny | Tracta Type A | 1.076 |
| 6 | 1.1 | 27 | (France) SA des Automobiles Tracta | (France) Jean-Albert Grégoire (France) Fernand Vallon | Tracta Type A | 1.059 |

=== 1929 index of performance (Prix Saint-Didier) ===
| Pos | Class | No. | Team | Drivers | Chassis | Index result |
|---|---|---|---|---|---|---|
| 1 | 8.0 | 1 | (United Kingdom) Bentley Motors Ltd | (United Kingdom) Woolf Barnato (United Kingdom) Henry “Tim” Birkin | Bentley Speed Six | 1.270 |
| 2 | 5.0 | 9 | (United Kingdom) Bentley Motors Ltd | (United Kingdom) Glen Kidston (United Kingdom) Jack Dunfee | Bentley 4½ Litre | 1.237 |
| 3 | 5.0 | 10 | (United Kingdom) Bentley Motors Ltd | (United Kingdom) Dr Dudley Benjafield (France) Baron André d'Erlanger | Bentley 4½ Litre | 1.177 |
| 4 | 5.0 | 8 | (United Kingdom) Bentley Motors Ltd | (United Kingdom) Frank Clement (France) Jean Chassagne | Bentley 4½ Litre | 1.163 |
| 5 | 5.0 | 14 | (France) Grand Garage Saint-Didier Paris | (France) Robert Benoist (France) Henri Stoffel | Chrysler Six Series 75 | 1.134 |
| 6 | 8.0 | 5 | (France) Automobiles Elite Paris | (France) Guy Bouriat (France) Philippe de Rothschild | Stutz Model M Blackhawk | 1.125 |
| 7 | 5.0 | 12 | (France) Grand Garage Saint-Didier Paris | (France) Cyril de Vere (France) Marcel Mongin | Chrysler Six Series 77 | 1.112 |
| 8 | 1.5 | 21 | (United Kingdom) K.S. Peacock (private entrant) | (United Kingdom) Kenneth Peacock (United Kingdom) Sammy Newsome | Lea-Francis S-Type Hyper | 1.106 |
| 9 | 1.1 | 26 | (France) SA des Automobiles Tracta | (France) Louis Balart (France) Louis Debeugny | Tracta Type A | 1.076 |
| 10 | 1.1 | 27 | (France) SA des Automobiles Tracta | (France) Jean-Albert Grégoire (France) Fernand Vallon | Tracta Type A | 1.059 |

- Note: Only the top ten positions are included in this set of standings.

=== Highest finisher in class ===
| Class | Winning car | Winning drivers |
|---|---|---|
| 5 to 8-litre | #1 Bentley Speed Six | Barnato / Birkin * |
| 3 to 5-litre | #9 Bentley 4½ Litre | Kidston / Dunfee * |
| 2 to 3-litre | no entrants | |
| 1500 to 2000cc | no finishers | |
| 1100 to 1500cc | #21 Lea-Francis S-Type Hyper | Peacock / Newsome |
| 750 to 1100cc | #26 Tracta Type A | Balart / Debeugny |
| up to 750cc | no finishers | |

- Note *: setting a new class distance record.
- There were no official class divisions for this race and these are the highest finishers in unofficial categories (used in subsequent years) related to the Index targets.

=== Statistics ===
- Fastest Lap – H. Birkin, #1 Bentley Speed Six – 7:21secs; 133.55 km/h (82.98 mph)
- Winning Distance – 2,843.83 km (1,767.07 mi)
- Winner's Average Speed – 118.49 km/h (73.63 mph)

Citations
