= D'Yrsan =

- Founded: 1923
- Defunct: 1930
- Headquarters: Asnières, France
- Key people: Raymond Siran de Cavanac
- Products: Automobiles

Raymond Siran, Cyclecars D'Yrsan was a French manufacturer of automobiles in the cyclecar class.

== The business ==
Raymond Siran de Cavanac, who previously had worked with the Levallois-Perret based automobile manufacturer S. Sandford, founded his own business in 1923 at Asnières-sur-Seine, concentrating on small cyclecar style vehicles under the D’Yrsan name, with three or four wheels. On the three wheelers the single wheel was placed at the back.

Production ended in 1930.

== The cars ==
=== Three wheels ===
The three wheelers with which the business started loosely resembled the three-wheeler Morgans of the same period. Power for the D’Yrsan "Model A" came from a Ruby 4-cylinder 6 HP side-valve engine of 904cc.

At the 19th Paris Motor Show, which took place in October 1924 ahead of the 1925 model year, the "Model A" was complemented by the D’Yrsan "Model BS", its engine size increased to 972cc, now featuring overhead valves. Both models sat on a 2,470 mm (97 in) wheelbase. With "Torpedo" format bodies they were, in October 1924, priced by the manufacturer at 9,650 francs and 10,500 francs respectively.

Later came the D’Yrsan "Model DS" with 1097cc for which a maximum output of 35 hp (26 kW) was listed.

In total D’Yrsan produced 530 three-wheelers, most of which were examples of the "Model BS".

=== Four wheels ===
For 1927 the D'Yrsan "Grand Sport" with four wheels was added to the range. The engine was the 1097cc unit bought in from Ruby. About 50 four wheelers were produced.

=== Competition ===
With sales volumes remaining modest, the manufacturer sought to make the D’Yrsan name better known by entering a car in the June 1929 24 Hours of Le Mans race. A car was entered, but unfortunately had to retire after nine laps, having completed fewer than 150 km (93 miles).
