= Coadou-Fleury =

- Industry: Automotive
- Founded: 1921
- Defunct: 1934
- Headquarters: Trébeurden, France
- Area served: France
- Key people: Marcel Coadou (chairperson)
- Products: Automobiles

Coadou-Fleury, also known as Coadou et Fleury, was an automobile manufacturer based in Trébeurden, France, that operated from 1921 to 1934.

== History ==
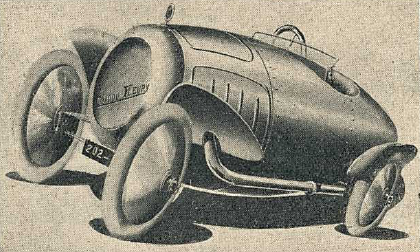
Illustration of the Coadou-Fleury cyclecar from 1920

In 1921, a pilot, Marcel Coadou, founded the automobile manufacturing company of Coadou-Fleury, based in Trébeurden, France. Its vehicles were manufactured in Paris, France.

The first vehicle manufactured by the company was a cyclecar. It had a Ruby sidevalve V4 engine with an engine displacement of either 850 cc or 903 cc, producing about 20 hp (15 kW). The vehicle had a monocoque body. It failed to attract customers, because of its high price.

In 1927, a further developed version of the Citroën Type B2 overhead valve engine was used, now producing 30 hp (22 kW). To vehicle was also equipped with four-wheel brakes. Later, the coupe version was also manufactured.

The last model that was made by the company was the Coadou-Fleury Aérolithe, which had an aerodynamic body. One unit has been preserved to the present day.

The company was dissolved in 1934.
