= Bollack Netter and Co =

Bollack, Netter, et Cie (B.N.C.)
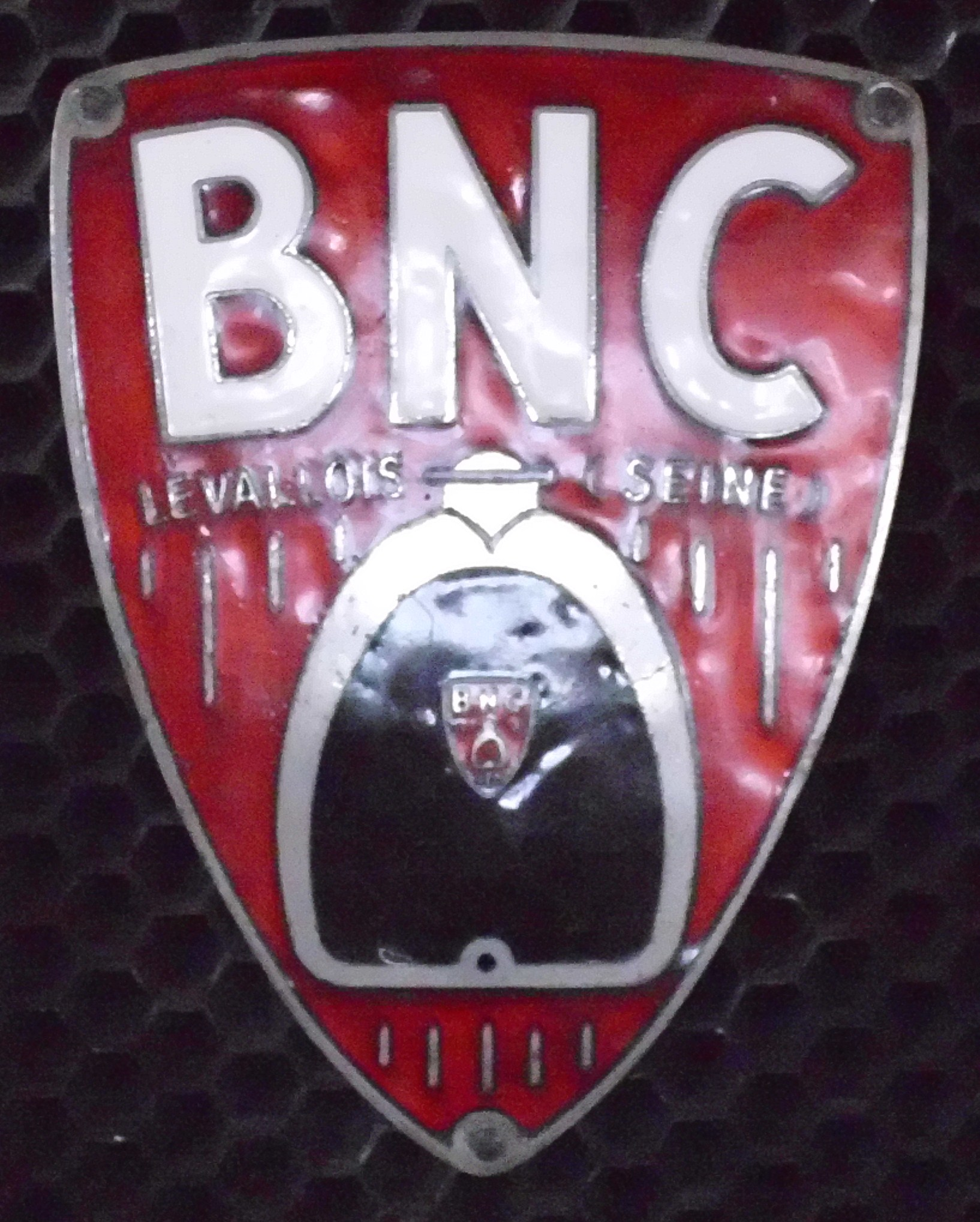
- Industry: Manufacturing
- Founded: 1923
- Founder: Lucien Bollack; René Netter
- Defunct: 1931
- Headquarters: Levallois-Perret (France)
- Key people: Jacques Muller
- Products: Automobiles

Bollack, Netter, et Cie (French: Bollack Netter et compagnie), more commonly known as B.N.C., was a small French automobile company in Levallois-Perret, situated on Avenue de Paris 39.

== History ==
B.N.C. was established by Lucien Bollack (an engineer who had also worked for Hispano-Suiza) and his financier, banker René Netter, in January 1923. The technical director was Jacques Muller, also known as "Jack". Muller's earlier J.M.K. cyclecar formed the basis of their first car the "DZ".

B.N.C. were a successful maker of cyclecars, winning many rallies albeit not selling very many cars. In the late 1920s, the company tried to penetrate a higher market sector – unfortunately the demand for large passenger cars and for ultra-light racing cars were both low, and Bollack and Netter were forced out of their company in 1928 when the business was acquired by Charles de Ricou, an energetic businessman who by now had a reputation for rescuing financially troubled automobile manufacturing businesses. In the case of B.N.C. his timing was less than perfect, however, in that (like many others) he failed to anticipate the Great Depression, B.N.C. launching the large 8-cylinder engined "Aigle" in October 1929, a few days before the stock market crashes gave notice of a decade of severe contraction and stagnation for the French economy.

Shortly after he had taken over at B.N.C., de Ricou took over two other companies in financial difficulty, Lombard and Rolland-Pilain; Charles de Ricou took a double stand, directly opposite one of the principal entrances of the Grand Palais, at the 25th Paris Motor Show in October 1931, and displayed on it cars from all three of his companies, B.N.C., Lombard and Rolland-Pilain. Models on display included the new B.N.C. 6-cylinder engined 2-litre B.N.C coupé "Vedette ADER". In the event this car was never produced for sale, however.

For 1931 a line of sporty front-wheel drive B.N.C. cars with pneumatic suspension were presented but came to naught. The doors of the firm were shuttered shortly afterwards.

One of B.N.C.'s drivers, André Siréjols, had already been building special bodies for B.N.C. cars. He took over the remaining stock of parts and kept on assembling a trickle of cars into the fifties, usually referred to as "B.N.C. Siréjols". The last of these continuation cars were equipped with Ford's "10 HP" 1172 cc side valve four.

== Automobiles ==
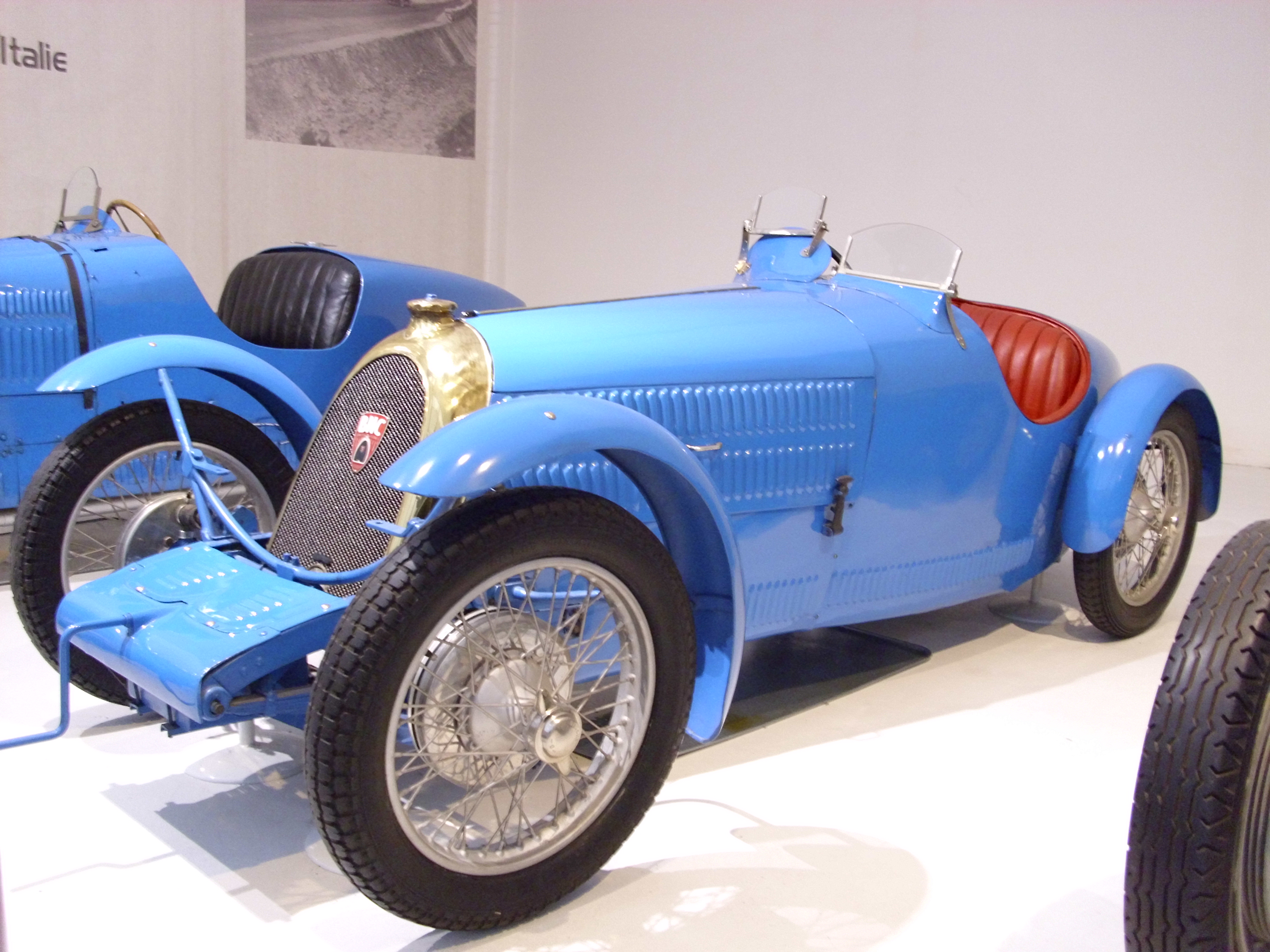
1926 B.N.C. Sports

Beginning with a single model, the DZ, before the first year was over the range had reached double digits. Three chassis and three different engines were offered, as were a plethora of bodystyles.

B.N.C. mainly produced sports cars, and their design was similar to that of the Amilcar. The cars' engines were not made at the factory, but were instead purchased from proprietary engine manufacturers such as Ruby (927 cc) and S.C.A.P. (900 cc). B.N.C. later produced a car with a 1,100 cc S.C.A.P. or Chapuis-Dornier engines, fitted with a Cozette supercharger. While most had three-speed gearboxes, a number of cars received four-speed units. In 1927 the B.N.C. Sport was presented, with overhead-valve engines from S.C.A.P. or Ruby, spoked wheels, and a strongly inclined radiator. In the late 1920s, BNC tried their hand at producing large passenger cars (the "Aigle") with four to five-liter eight-cylinder engines made by Lycoming.

To prove the mettle of the cars, a standard B.N.C. with an 1,100 cc Ruby engine lapped the (then unpaved) Le Mans circuit for 24 hours straight in 1928. The average speed was above 90 km/h (56 mph).

After having been forced out of the company, Lucien Bollack retained the import rights to the American Lycoming engines. He went on to manufacture the large Lycoming-engined (again of four or five liters) Aigle in 1929. Only a very few were built, however (possibly only a single example), and the company had ceased trading by 1930.

== Competition ==
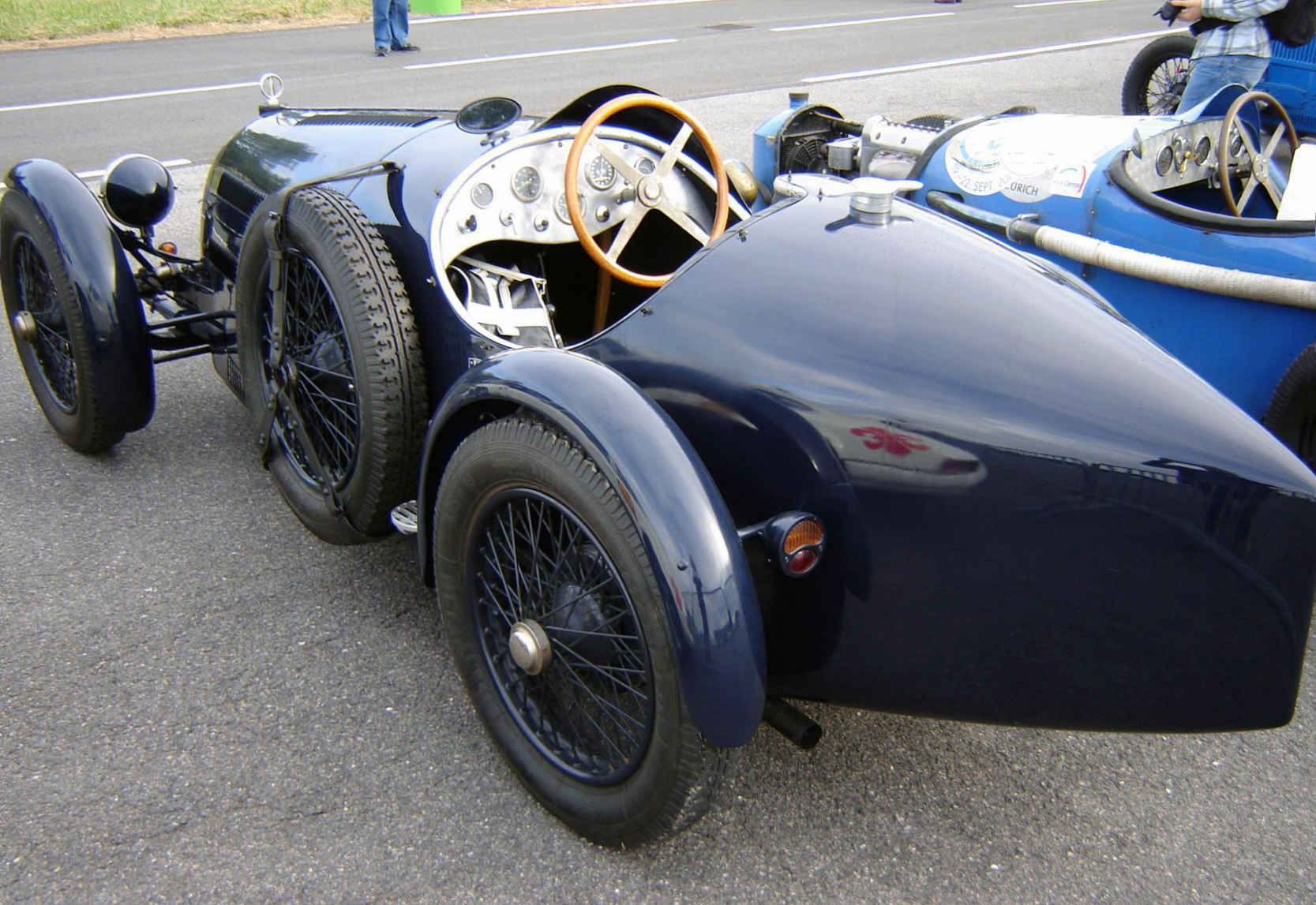
Rear view of 1927 B.N.C. 527

The firm's greatest victory was a double win at Fontainebleau (with lady racer Violette Morris at the wheel of the winning car), at the 1927 Bol d'Or.

In 1928 a BNC finished in seventh place at Le Mans. At the 1929 Le Mans 24 hour race the manufacturer entered three cars. Two were powered by 995cc engines and retired from the race early on. The third was a 1500cc car and covered 88 laps before retiring: this car attracted attention for another reason, since it featured an imposing vertical radiator-grille at the front rather than a sloping grille of the style that by this time had become a standard feature of BNC track cars.

In 1930, a B.N.C. won its class at the Spa 24 Hours race. The following year, while leading its class, the engine broke down a few hours before the finish and the car ended up in thirteenth place, with Arthur Duray and Charlier driving. B.N.C. cars are also still used in rallies.

=== Popular racing models ===
- B.N.C. Super Sport
- B.N.C. FCD
- B.N.C. 527

== See also ==
- S.C.A.P.
- Lycoming Engines
- Amilcar
