= Ruby (car) =

French cyclecar manufacturer

Ruby was a French manufacturer of cyclecars. After automobile production ended they remained in business as an engine builder.

== Company history ==
The company which built the Ruby cars and engines was called H. Godefroy et Lévêque and was located in Levallois-Perret, in northwestern Paris. In 1909 they began building automobiles under their own names, the production of which ended by 1922. After the building of automobiles came to an end the company proceeded to develop and sell proprietary engines to a large number of small light car manufacturers. Some of the earlier cyclecars were marketed under the "Super" brand until 1919 or thereabouts.

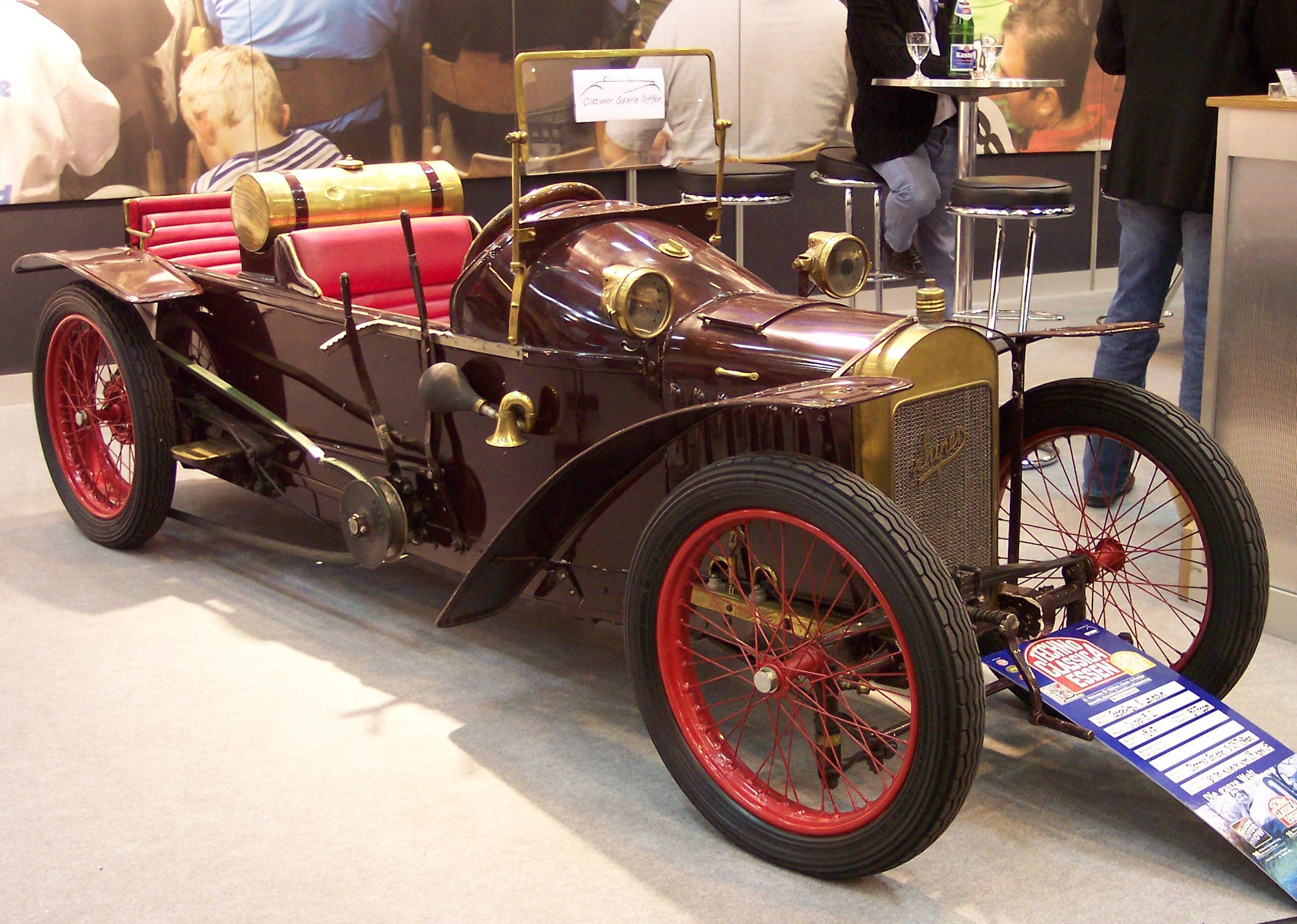
1917 Super B2 (977 cc)

== Automobiles ==
Until 1914 Godefroy et Lévêque offered three single-cylinder cars and three two-cylinder versions, from 6CV to 12CV. They were also sold in England (until 1912) as the "Elburn-Ruby" and until 1914 as the "Tweenie". In 1919 an inline-four engined version appeared.

== Engines ==
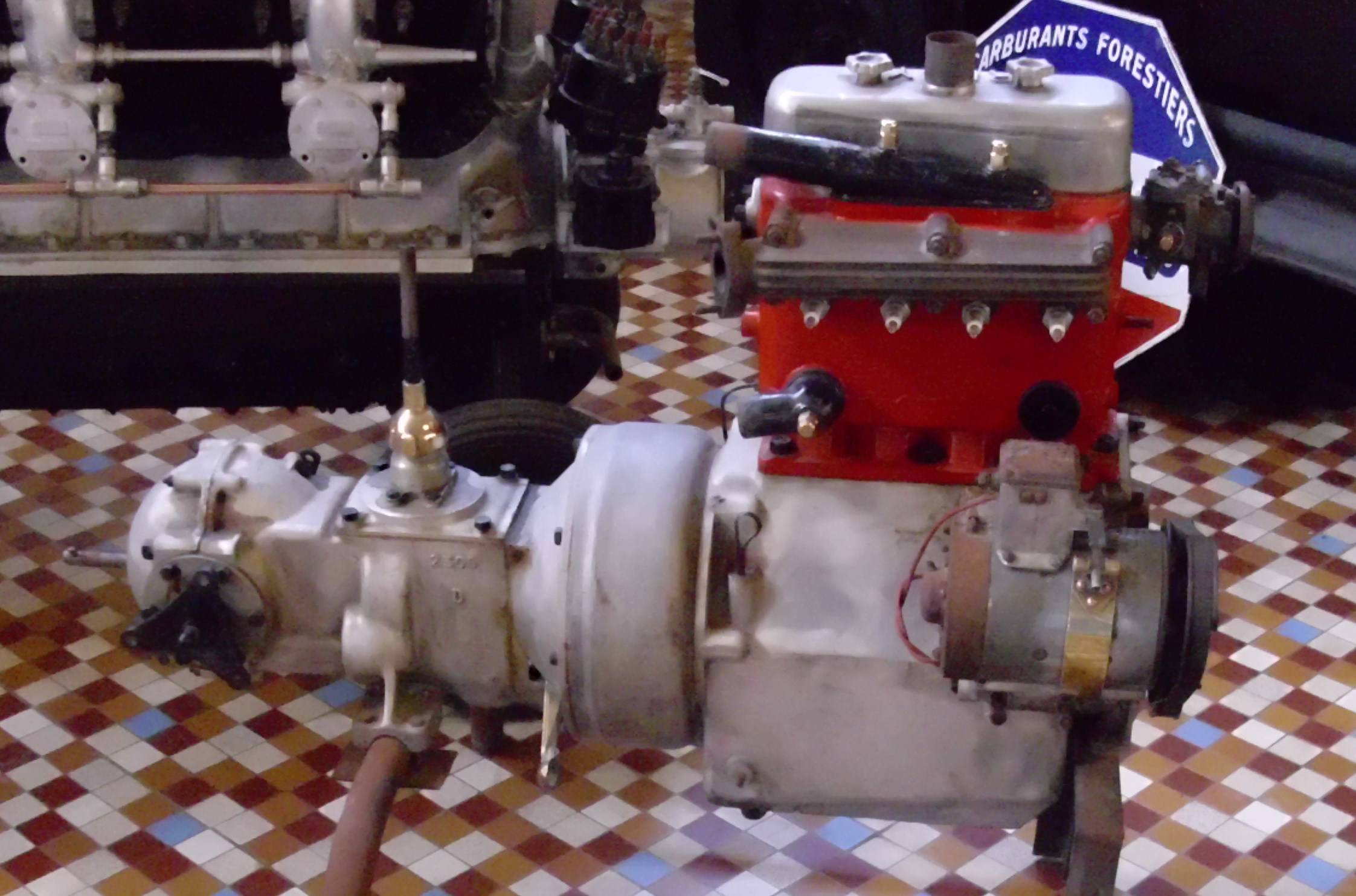
Ruby four-cylinder engine

Ruby engines were installed in a large number of different brands of light cars and cyclecars, including but not limited to: B.N.C., Coadou et Fleury, D’Yrsan, E.H.P., Georges Irat, Hinstin, JG Sport, Jousset, Kevah, Lambert, Le Cabri, Philos, Rally, Sandford, and Sénéchal. Production of Ruby engines did not recommence after World War II.

Ruby's first success was the "type A" 903 cc sidevalve "four", with a 55 mm bore and 95 mm stroke; this engine won a number of class victories in the very early 1920s. There was also the "AS" block, with a 57 mm bore for a 972 cc displacement. Ruby's first "1100" was the "OC Grand Sport" with 1094 cc (59 × 100 mm, the same dimensions as the Chapuis-Dornier "1100" engine of the same period). In early 1926 the "DS Grand Sport" appeared; of 60 × 97 mm bore and stroke it is a 1097 cc engine which produces between 30 and 34 PS (22 and 25 kW).

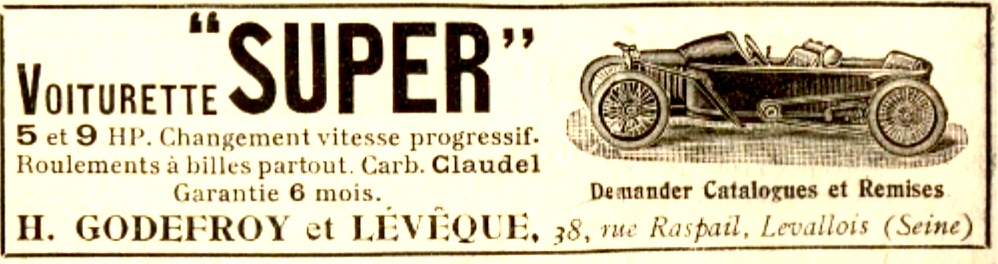
1913 Super 5 hp or 9 hp

The Ruby K was a later, overhead valve supercharged performance version; with 62 × 90 mm bore and stroke it has a displacement of 1087 cc. Many of Ruby's other engines were also available with superchargers fitted, from René Cozette or other manufacturers.
