= Automobiles Lombard =

French automobile manufacturer

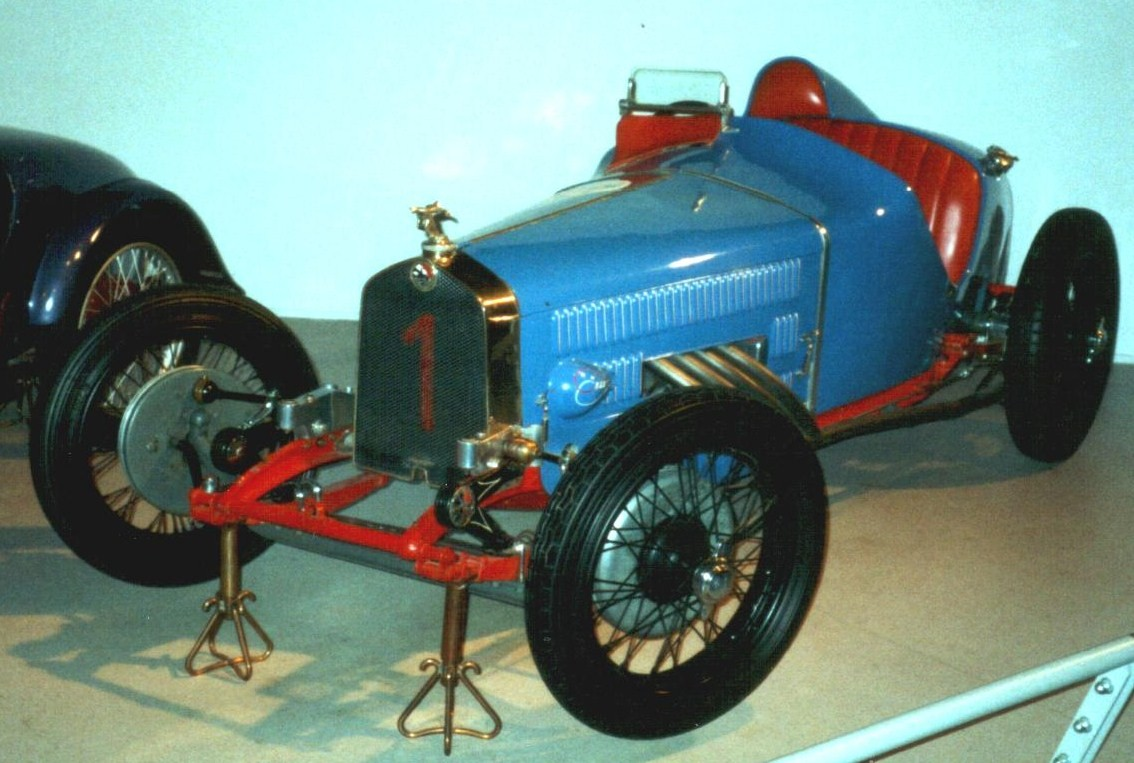
- Industry: Manufacturing
- Founded: 1927
- Defunct: 1929
- Headquarters: Puteaux, France
- Key people: André Lombard; Edmond Vareille
- Products: Automobiles, Engines

Automobiles Lombard was a French automobile manufacturer which was active from 1927 to 1929.

== André Lombard ==
André Lombard's early career in the automobile business involved working with Salmson, and he also acquired a reputation as a competition driver for Salmson. Lombard's final position with Salmson was as Commercial Director, and it was in this capacity that he had a major falling out with the company's Technical Director, Émile Petit. Petit accused Lombard of having purchased production equipment of poor quality. Bad feeling between the two continued to fester and in 1923 André Lombard left Salmson: the agreement covering his departure included a five-year "non-competition clause".

== Start of automobile development ==
Lombard accordingly devoted his energies to competition driving, but he evidently never entirely lost his appetite for automobile manufacturing, and in defiance of the five year clause, just four years after leaving Salmson he presented, at Montlhéry, his first model, the Lombard AL1, accompanied by two Aerodynamic ("tank" bodied in the parlance of the time) AL2s. These were prototypes, but they formed the basis for the Lombard AL3 which followed a year later, and which was the manufacturer's first production model.

The cars were developed by Edmond Vareille and used a "light voiturette" style. Various addresses in the Paris area were associated with the production of the automobiles: the registered head office was at Puteaux.

== Automobile production ==
Lombard took a stand at the 20th Paris Motor Show in October 1926 and exhibited the car they would be selling in 1927. The Lombard AL3 was powered by a 4-cylinder twin-overhead camshaft engine of 1,083cc. Some of the engines on the production cars would be fitted with superchargers.

By the time production ended, in 1929, (approximately) 94 cars were recorded as having been produced, almost all of which were AL3s.

== Production locations ==
Initially the cars were produced by E. Briault in Courbevoie. From 1928 the cars were assembled by The Émile Salmson sons (Les Fils de É. Salmson) at Boulogne-Billancourt. Another source indicates that the cars were assembled at Argenteuil by BNC. All the production locations given here were geographically close together, in a district that had become the country's principal centre for automobile production, on the north-western fringes of Paris. When production ended in 1929 it was BNC that acquired the components inventory and a number of half finished Lombards.

== Models ==
Models produced included the following:

- AL1 of 1927 - A one-off prototype racing car
- AL2 of 1927 - Streamlined racing car - two produced
- AL3 Mk I of 1927
- AL3 Mk II of 1928
- AL4 of 1928 - A one-off prototype
- AL5 of 1929 - A one-off prototype

== Motor sport ==
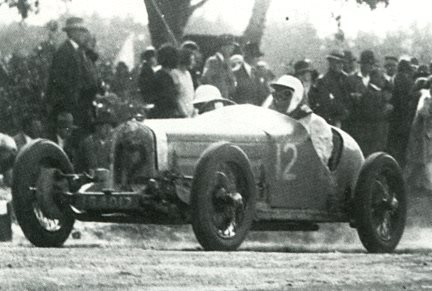
Bill Lowe contesting the 1929 Australian Grand Prix in a Lombard AL3

W.H. "Bill" Lowe drove a Lombard AL3 in the 1929 Australian Grand Prix, placing third outright and winning the 901cc to 1100cc class.

== Reading list ==
- Harald Linz, Halwart Schrader: Die Internationale Automobil-Enzyklopädie. United Soft Media Verlag, München 2008, ISBN 978-3-8032-9876-8. (German)
