= 1930 24 Hours of Le Mans =

8th 24 Hours of Le Mans endurance race

Previous: 1929	Next: 1931
Index: Races | Winners

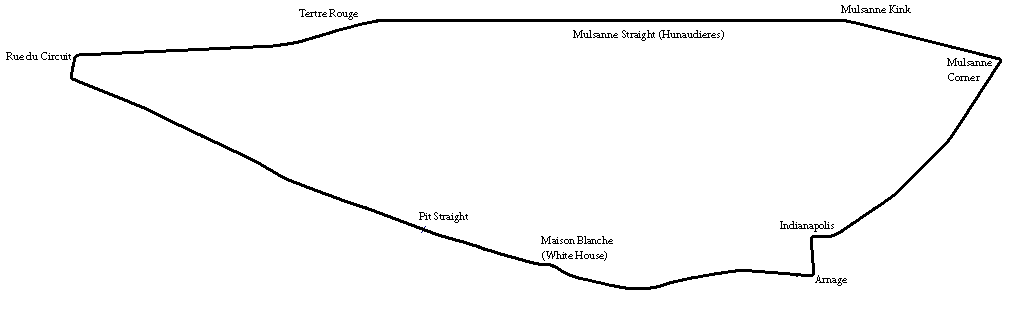
The Le Mans circuit in 1930

The 1930 24 Hours of Le Mans was the 8th Grand Prix of Endurance that took place at the Circuit de la Sarthe on 21 and 22 June 1930. It saw the first appearance of a German car and the first entry from female drivers.

In the smallest ever field in the Le Mans history; there were only 17 starters. This was a race of two halves. At the start the Mercedes of Rudolf Caracciola/Christian Werner was pursued by the supercharged ‘Blower’ Bentley of Tim Birkin. Twice he passed the white car on the Mulsanne Straight and both times he was thwarted by a rear-tyre blowout. Then Sammy Davis chased in a works Bentley. When that car was put into the sandbank at Pontlieue corner, it was the other works Bentley of Woolf Barnato and Glen Kidston taking up the Germans’ challenge. The lead changed a number of times into the night, until at 1.30am when the Mercedes was retired with a broken dynamo and a flat battery.

After that it became a procession for the remaining Bentleys, although both the privateer Blower Bentleys retired on Sunday. The two works cars carried on and cruised to another formation finish. Barnato had won his third consecutive Le Mans, from three starts. Talbot finished third and fourth and took the lucrative Index of Performance prize by the narrowest of margins (0.004) from the winning Bentley. The Bugatti of Marguerite Mareuse and Odette Siko had a trouble-free run and finished seventh, stealing the contemporary headlines from Bentley.

== Regulations ==
The AIACR (forerunner of the FIA) Appendix C rules stayed in effect. The biggest change this year was the Automobile Club de l'Ouest (ACO) now allowing private entrants as well as “works” entries from the manufacturers. This just acknowledged the existing practice of private owners being entered by the car-company. Five engine-classes were specified, with brackets at 3.0, 2.0, 1.5 and 1-litres.

To be eligible, a minimum of thirty vehicles had to have been produced, and the cars had to be “as per sales catalogue”. Many small companies were selling bare chassis upon which an owner would get a coach-builder to put on a body-shelled, so the specifications were still quite broad as long as the car had some basic minimum equipment (mudguards, lights, hood, windscreen etc.).

As engine power advanced, the ACO once again adjusted the Index target distances. Example targets included the following:

Engine size	1929 Minimum distance	1930 Minimum distance	Equivalent laps	Minimum vehicle weight	Ballast
8000cc		2,500 km (1,600 mi)	153.0 laps	1820 kg	180 kg
5000cc		2,460 km (1,530 mi)	150.6 laps	1215 kg	180 kg
3000cc	2,207 km (1,371 mi)	2,330 km (1,450 mi)	142.6 laps	875 kg	120 kg
2000cc	2,105 km (1,308 mi)	2,210 km (1,370 mi)	135.3 laps	790 kg	120 kg
1500cc	1,980 km (1,230 mi)	2,132 km (1,325 mi)	128.5 laps	670 kg	120 kg
1000cc	1,946 km (1,209 mi)	2,000 km (1,200 mi)	122.4 laps	430 kg	60 kg

The Société des Pétroles Jupiter, Shell's French agents, provided three standard fuel options: Gasoline, Benzole and a 70/30 blend of the two. Teams were allowed to add up to 2% by volume of their own additives. As before, all liquids (fuel, oil and water) could only be replenished after every 20 laps (326.8 km (203.1 mi)).

Night-time, when headlights had to be used, was defined by the ACO for the race as between 9.30pm and 4am.

== Entries ==
In the middle of the Great Depression, the auto-industry was being hit very hard. Only 33 cars entered for the race, of which only 19 arrived. That said it was a quality field with two big Bentley entries challenged by a mighty 7-litre supercharged Mercedes and one of the supercharged Alfa Romeos dominating European racing, both privately entered. France could muster only two works Tractas, a BNC and a privateer Bugatti to their premier touring car race.

Category	Entries	Classes
Large-sized engines	17 / 11	over 2-litre
Medium-sized engines	6 / 2	1 to 2-litre
Small-sized engines	4 / 4	up to 1-litre
Total entrants	27 / 17	

- Note: The first number is the number of entries, the second the number who started.

Defending champions Bentley once again arrived with a solid works team, this year bringing a trio of their big Speed Six model. Introduced in 1928 as a competitor to the Rolls-Royce Phantom I, it had a 6.6-litre engine that produced 190 bhp giving it a top speed of 185 kp/h (115 mph). Company director (and race winner in 1928 and 1929), Woolf Barnato would drive the lead car – the same chassis that had been entered in the 1929 race. This year his co-driver was his wealthy friend Glen Kidston. The other two were driven by 1924-winner Frank Clement with former Stutz-driver Dick Watney, and 1927-winner and journalist Sammy Davis with Clive Dunfee.

Back in 1928, Barnato's fellow race-winner, Sir Henry “Tim” Birkin had seen the threat posed by the new supercharged Mercedes and Alfa Romeos to Bentley's dominance of touring car racing. He had approached W. O. Bentley and Barnato about supercharging the green cars. Barnato was not convinced and W.O loathed the idea. He eventually found an investor in the form of young heiress, and keen motorist, Dorothy Paget (who already owned a Mercedes-Benz SSK). The cars were not race-ready in time for the 1929 race; however Barnato quietly approved sufficient funds to allow the required production quantity to be met. Based on the 4½ Litre model, a massive, distinctive Roots supercharger was fitted in front of the radiator. This boosted the engine output from 130 to 240 bhp. However, it also raised the fuel consumption and its front-end weight gave the car noticeable understeer. Improved over the close-season, a team of three “Blower Bentleys” arrived, managed by former Bentley-driver and Lagonda team-manager Bertie Kensington-Moir. Birkin renewed his 1928 Le Mans partnership with Jean Chassagne, while race-winner Dudley Benjafield drove with former Alfa Romeo test-driver (and now British resident) Giulio Ramponi. The third car was driven by Boris Harcourt-Wood and Jack Dunfee, Clive's older brother.

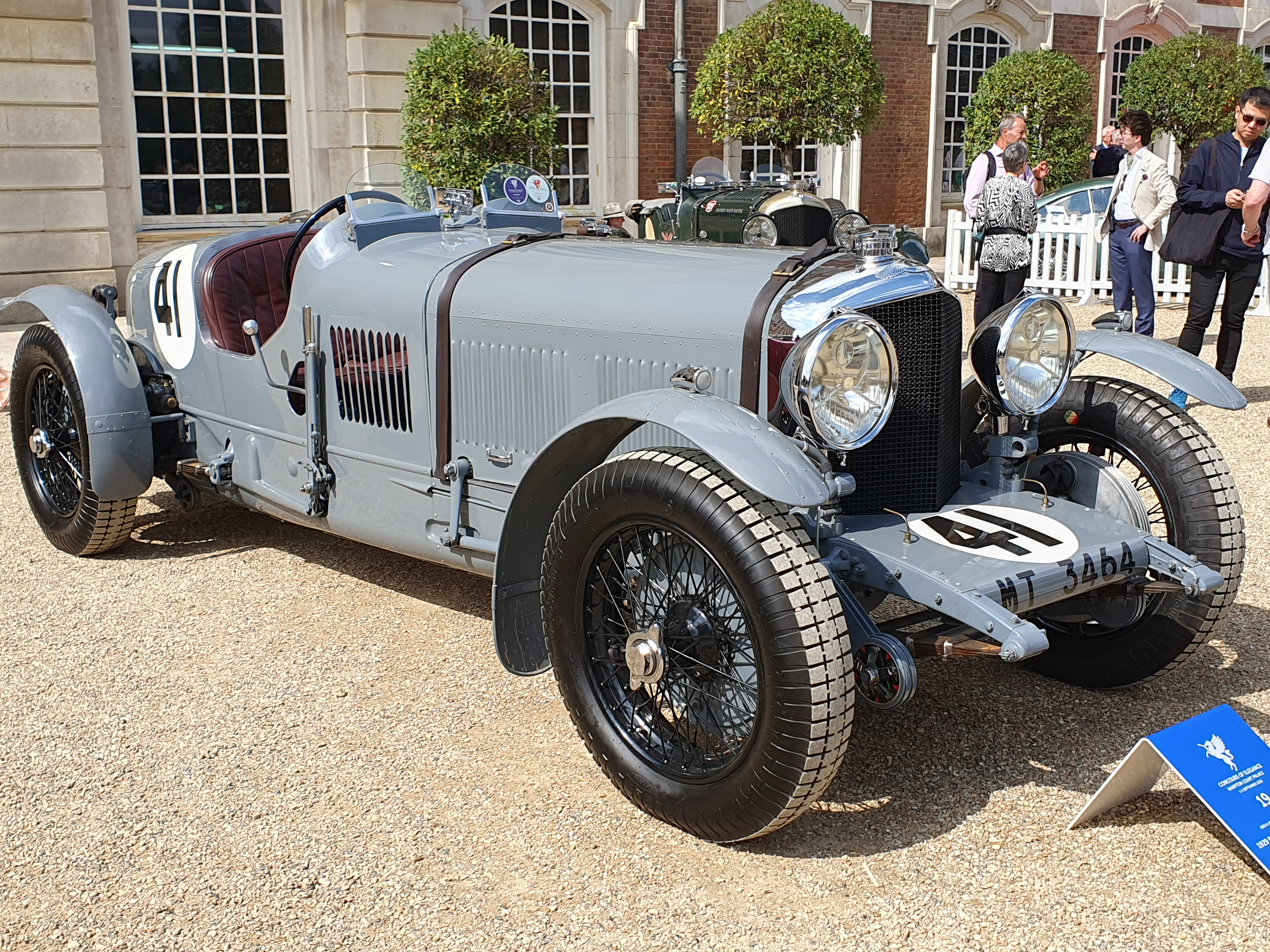
Bentley Speed Six "Old Number One", MT3464 seen at Hampton Court in 2023

The first German car to run at Le Mans was a privateer entry. Mercedes and Benz had merged in 1926 and had considerable racing success, but with the Depression the company closed its works racing team. Team manager Alfred Neubauer, however, convinced the board to bankroll a privateer team. This was run by their top works driver Rudolf “Rudi” Caracciola. The SSK (Super Sports Kurz) was designed by Ferdinand Porsche as a development of the SS model. The giant 170 bhp 7.1-litre engine could be augmented by a Roots supercharger to put out 300 bhp. However, unlike the Bentleys, the supercharger was not designed to be run all the time (not least for reasons of chronic fuel consumption), and the team was able to convince the ACO to discount the 1.3 supercharger modifier when dictating the car's target distance. Caracciola's co-driver was also from the Mercedes-Benz works team, Christian Werner.

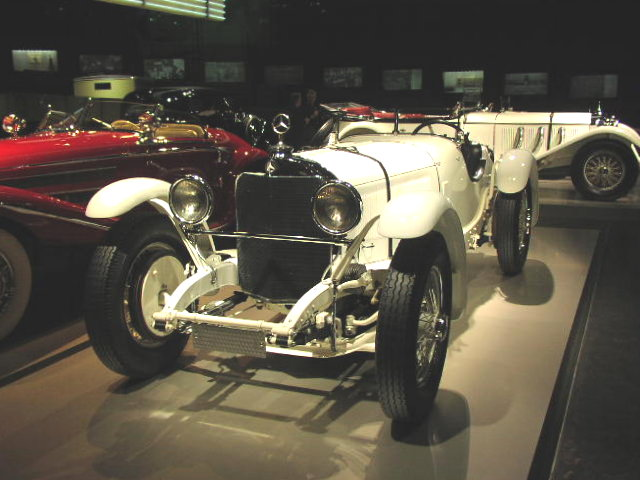
Mercedes SSK

Stutz was present at Le Mans again, through two black-painted private entries. The latest model M versions came in two wheelbase lengths, with the shorter designated the “MA”. The new 5.3-litre sidevalve engine now put out 120 bhp. Edouard Brisson was having his first race after the bad 1929 Le Mans when a fuel-fire had badly burnt his face and hands. His co-driver was the experienced Louis Rigal, former Ariés works driver. The other car was owned by wine-company heir Philippe de Rothschild. Keen to keep his anonymity he raced under the pseudonym “Georges Philippe” and had an American banking friend, Dick Parke, put the entry in for him. He had Edmond Bourlier (formerly from Talbot and Delage works teams) as his co-driver with Parke acting as reserve driver for both cars.

The Sunbeam-Talbot-Darracq marque returned to Le Mans this year. The successful Talbot 14/45 had been developed into the 18/70 model with a racing version, the AO90 (a reference to its top speed over 90 mph). The 2.3L engine now put out 95 bhp. The Fox & Nicholl team were looking for new cars since Lagonda closed its racing programme in January. They purchased three Talbots but a disastrous fatal accident at Brooklands wrecked them. In less than five weeks, two were repaired for Le Mans. Georges Roesch, chief engineer at Clément-Talbot, was concerned that like the Blower Bentleys, the French fuels would not be suitable for the Talbots. He asked the ACO if they could run on ethyl fuel but this was refused. Leslie Callingham, head of Shell's technical department in London (and driving an Alfa Romeo in the race) said the hybrid fuel would be suitable, although the engine output would drop to about 70 bhp. The drivers were to be Johnny Hindmarsh / Tim Rose-Richards and Brian Lewis, Baron Essendon / Hugh Eaton.

The other significant Le Mans debut was also a privateer entry. Alfa Romeo had already achieved great success in grand prix racing in the 1920s. Vittorio Jano’s 6C successor design, debuting in 1927, followed on this adapting as a sports car or grand prix racer in the Formula Libre events. Initially a 1.5-litre, in 1929 it was also available with a 1752cc twin-cam engine, and both versions had a supercharged variant. As well as a works team, two other new significant customer teams ran the 1750 SS: Enzo Ferrari in Italy and Fred Stiles, the London importer, focusing almost exclusively on their respective countries. Its light weight and superior handling gave it excellent acceleration and made it better through the corners than the bigger cars. Le Mans was not considered by any of the three teams. However, a car owned by wealthy British racer Earl Francis Howe was entered, with support from the Stiles team including former Bentley driver, Leslie Callingham as co-driver. With the 1.3 supercharger co-efficient they had the same Index target as the Talbots.

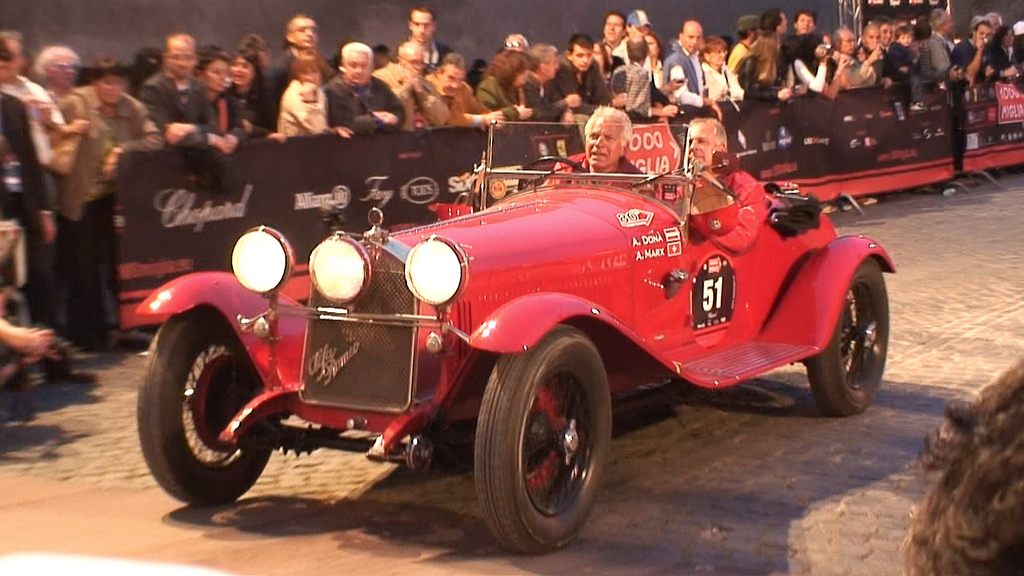
Alfa Romeo 6C-1750 SS

After the withdrawals of Alvis and the new Scotsman car, the only entries in the 2-litre class were from BNC and Kenneth Peacock's supercharged Lea-Francis S-Type. Having raced the year before, Peacock had purchased a new car and returned as a privateer entry with Sammy Newsome again as co-driver. BNC had not survived the economic downturn and had been purchased by French entrepreneur Charles de Ricou, who also picked up Lombard and Rolland-Pilain, and its successor AER. The BNC Vedette was the new model based on the F28, the last Rolland-Pilain design.

Bugatti, despite having organised races for its car-owners on the Le Mans circuit, had not competed in the endurance race since the inaugural 1923 race. Wealthy French heiress Marguerite Mareuse entered her Type 40 tourer as a privateer, inviting talented driver Odette Siko as her co-driver – becoming the first women to enter the race. Based around the 1.5-litre engine of the Type 37 race-car, it put out about 45 bhp to a 4-speed gearbox.

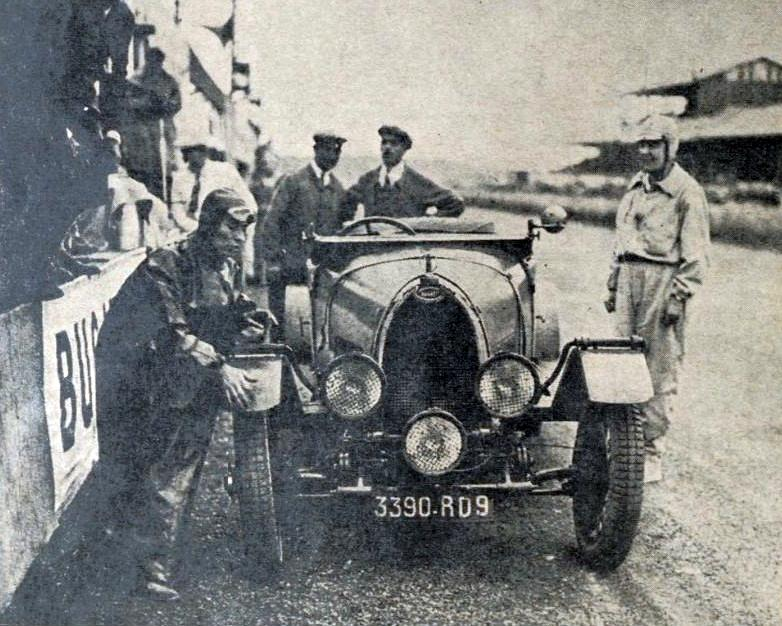
Mmes Mareuse & Siko with their Bugatti in the pits

Jean-Albert Grégoire’s small Tracta company had been very successful at Le Mans with its reliable front-wheel drive and patented Universal joint system. The works team bought two Type A models to the race (unsupercharged this time), Grégoire racing with Vallon as usual, and Bourcier with Debeugny. The smallest cars in the field were from MG Cars, making its Le Mans debut. Morris Garages was set up in 1909 by William Morris as a sales/service division of his Morris Motors. In 1928 after strong sales success, the company was relaunched as MG Car Company under Cecil Kimber. The MG M-type “Midget” was built on the Minor chassis with a plywood and fabric body. This year's version had the 847cc engine uprated to put out 27 bhp that made it capable of 110 kp/h (70 mph). Two cars were prepared for Francis Samuelson and Huskinson & Fane, the London MG agents.

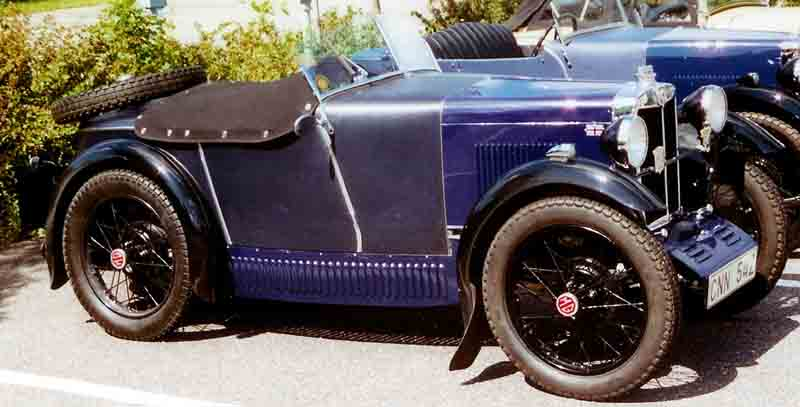
MG M-type Midget

== Practice ==
On race-week, the competitors were allowed to do practice laps on the Wednesday, Thursday and Friday nights between 10pm and 6am. However, the roads were not closed to the public and the ACO advised drivers it was at their own risk. The big Mercedes showed its class, able to reach 195 kp/h (120 mph) on the Mulsanne straight.

The Paget-team Bentleys had a bad practice week. The Harcourt-Wood/Dunfee car had a big-end failure and all the cars were suffering overheating issues. This was found to be due to the high combustion temperatures of the hybrid fuel. The team decided to switch to the pure-benzol option, but it meant changing the engine compression ratios and fitting new pistons. There was only time to change two of the cars so the Harcourt-Wood/Dunfee car was withdrawn. Faced with a similar issue, the Talbots had been modified in May.

The BNC team had a last minute emergency just before the start. A split fuel-tank needed to be emptied and repaired. The race started as it was being refuelled, but then the car refused to start. So the starting field was only 17 – the smallest in the Le Mans race history.

== Race ==
=== Start ===
As a change from recent years, the race-day was sunny and hot. Caracciola, at the head of the line, was away first. On lap 2, his first flying lap, he broke the lap record (with a 6m52s) and then turned off the supercharger. This allowed the hard-charging Birkin in his Blower Bentley to close in. W.O. Bentley preferred to let the privateer do the chasing, telling his drivers to look after their cars and wave him through. On the fourth lap, Birkin was on Caracciola's tail at the Pontlieue curves. Reaching 195 kp/h he got past the Mercedes as they braked heavily for the Mulsanne corner. Birkin did a 6m48s to set a new lap record, but on the next lap the tread came off a rear tyre and he had to pit. It took only half a minute to change the wheel, and then in only five laps Birkin was right behind the Mercedes. Just as he again overtook Caracciola on the Mulsanne Straight the tread on the other tyre let go. Although he dropped two wheels off the road, Birkin was able to complete the pass until the tyre blew at Arnage forcing him to pit yet again.

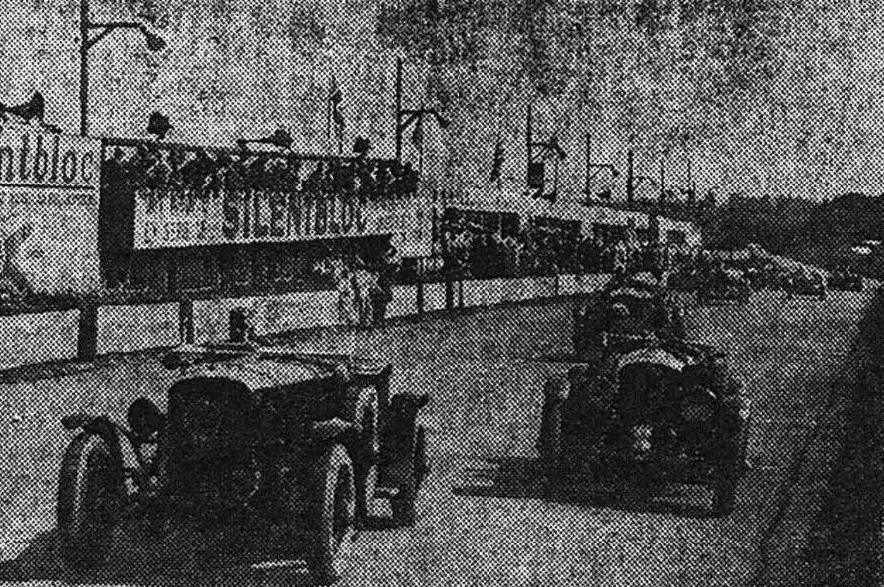
Race start – Brisson's Stutz ahead of Birkin

Meanwhile, further back, de Rothschild had gone into the tight Arnage corner too fast and ploughed into the earth bank at speed. Able to reverse back out, he made it to pits where the crew verified the damage was not severe. The other Stutz had also had problems, with Brisson handling a misfiring engine at the start and then Rigal running off the road a couple of times, dislodging the exhaust pipe. The Lea-Francis lost time when it came to a stop about a kilometre from the pits. It took half an hour, but once Peacock cleaned the spark-plugs he was away again without further bother.

Caracciola's next challenger was Sammy Davis in his works Bentley. Despite a stone thrown up and smashing his goggles he stayed on the German's tail to the first pitstops after 20 laps. Bloodied, he handed over to Clive Dunfee who only managed a half-lap when he buried it in a sandbank at Pontlieue. With no shovel on hand it took him, and then Davis, over two hours to dig it out only to discover the front axle was wrecked. Kidston pitted his Bentley with a tyre tread thrown on his in-lap. Barnato took over and set about gradually closing in, finally overtaking Werner in the Mercedes around 8.30pm.

Behind the Mercedes and Bentleys ran the Stutzes and the Earl Howe's Alfa Romeo. The Talbots were running 9th and 10th, but were able to run an hour longer than the bigger cars ahead of them before refuelling. They picked up a place as the Alfa Romeo was delayed – a race-long struggle with fouled plugs and ignition from the blended fuel. At the back of the field, the nimble MGs were easily leading the Tractas (delayed, like others, by plug issues) in their own battle for small-engine honours. However the MGs soon ran into trouble. Samuelson's was waylaid by a failed big-end bearing, while Murton-Neale's skated off the track at the Pontlieue corners. French gendarmes had just sprinkled sand over the road to stop melting tar in the afternoon heat. He was furious and angrily threw the fencing he had just demolished with his car at the officials. Back at the pits, the car got assessed from damage. His co-driver did a few laps but was not convinced it was safe, so Murton-Neale got back in and drove on into the night. Around half-time, the car was finally retired with a broken con-rod.

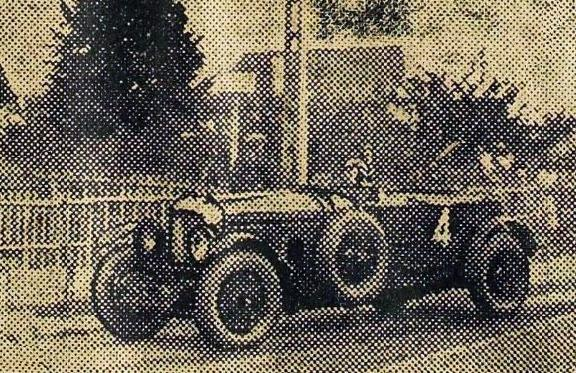
Barnato cornering at Pontlieue

At 9pm the Brisson/Rigal Stutz caught fire suddenly on the Mulsanne Straight. The improvised repairs to the exhaust pipe had come loose and flames set the car alight. Rigal managed to pull the car over and get out, narrowly missed by Barnato's Bentley. Hindmarsh, also running close behind him, stopped his Talbot and ran to help him with his own fire extinguisher. Parked far from any marshal posts, it took an hour for the fire to be put out, as official cars ferried fire extinguishers to the incident. The flames dazzled drivers and smoke from the destroyed car could be seen from the middle of Le Mans city. Not long after, the other Stutz had retired. The rear axle had, in fact, been knocked in de Rothschild's excursion and broke, leaving him not far from the other smouldering Stutz.

=== Night ===
By nightfall, after five tyre failures, the Birkin/Chassagne car was running seventh. In the sister car, Ramponi pitted with a high fever and feeling quite unwell. Benjafield took over facing having to drive the rest of the race. Mercedes team manager Neubauer authorised his driver to start re-using the supercharger to close back in and going into the night, the spectators watched a thrilling duel as the two cars swapped the lead. Just before midnight the two pitted together and the Bentley just got out first. This came to an end at 1.30am though when the Mercedes slowed with its headlights flickering. Werner pitted but could not restart from its pitstop. A wire had come loose on its dynamo and the battery had gone flat. This left the Bentleys running 1-2-3-5, the works Speed Sixes ahead of the Blowers with Barnato/Kidston holding a six-lap lead over Clement/Watney. The Talbots were now running fourth and sixth, splitting the hard-charging Birkin/Chassagne Bentley making up for its lost time. Shortly before 3am, Rose-Richards bought his Talbot into the pits when the front-wing began to come apart, affecting his headlamps. The team jury-rigged a fix with wire and cords. This allowed the Alfa Romeo, running better in the cool night, to pass back into sixth.

=== Morning ===
The second half of the race devolved into a routine procession. Early morning mist and a heavy rain shower also contributed to a dour race. After 8 o’clock Birkin and Chassagne finally caught the Lewis/Eaton Talbot and moved up to fourth. But then just before midday their Bentley broke a conrod and had to retire. Then within an hour, the other Blower Bentley also lost its engine, after Benjafield had driven solidly for fourteen hours without relief. This promoted the Talbots now into third and fourth, until the running repairs on the Hindmarsh/Rose-Richards car came adrift again. This time they pulled off the superfluous headlamp and secured the fender with leather straps going around the radiator cap and front chassis. The three pitstops required again allowed Howe's Alfa to get past a second time.

In the early afternoon, a short, heavy downpour swept across the circuit. The main excitement was the close race for the Index prize between Bentley and Talbot. Both teams told their leading cars to push on harder. With two hours to go, Eaton pitted his Talbot to clear a fuel blockage: a paper label off a fuel-churn had fallen in and got stuck on the filter. It cost a lap and let the Bentley get ahead. The handicapping favoured the smaller car and Eaton's hard driving soon retook the lead only to lose it again when they pitted to free a stuck throttle. When a late stop delayed Howe in the Alfa Romeo, the Talbots once again were in third and fourth.

=== Finish and post-race ===
Once again Bentley staged a formation finish. Woolf Barnato, getting back-to-back victories in the same Speed-Six chassis as he driven to win in 1929, promptly announced his retirement with the enviable Le Mans record of three entries for three outright wins. In the end the Alfa Romeo was only eighteen kilometres (1 lap) behind the Talbots. British drivers filled the first six places with the privateer Lea-Francis coming home in sixth. Despite the early delay, Peacock and Newsome still covered four more laps than their previous year's effort.

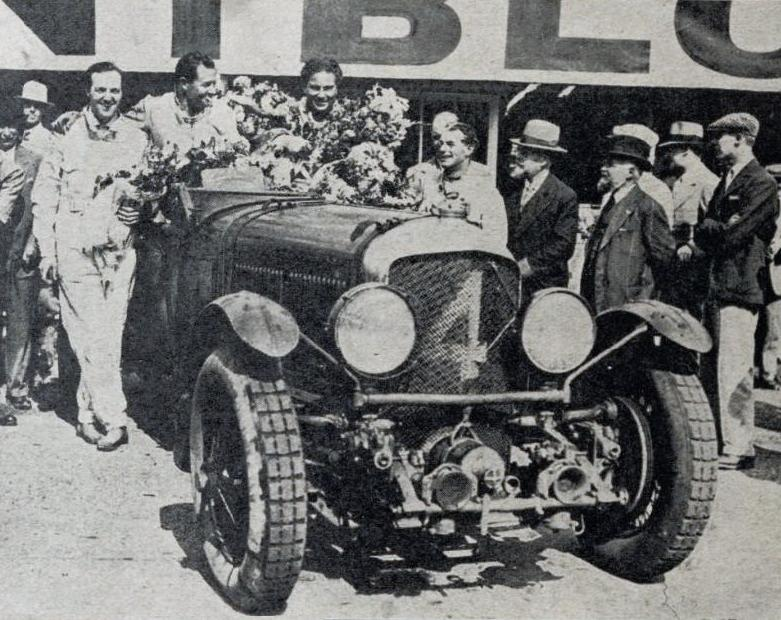
Barnato & Kidston in their winning Bentley Speed Six

In a tight finish, Talbot won the Index prize by the narrowest of margins: only 0.004 from the winning Bentley, amounting to barely a lap between them. Three French cars were the remaining finishers, highlighted by the women in the Bugatti after a trouble-free run to seventh, and Jean-Albert Grégoire leading home both his Tracta cars. Grégoire was lucky to finish, as he had just put his car in a ditch on his last lap. Unofficial help from spectators pulled him out in time.

It was a curious fact that the Bentleys had a number of tyre delaminations of their Dunlops. Whereas the Talbots, and Mercedes (albeit abbreviated), had run on their starting set of Dunlops through their whole race.

Bentley had now achieved five wins in the first eight Le Mans. But like many other manufacturers, the company was hit hard with plummeting demand in the Great Depression and soon after Bentley disbanded its works racing team. In 1931 Barnato let two loan repayments lapse. The receivers were called in and in November the company was bought out by Rolls-Royce. Nor did Glen Kidston get back to Le Mans. A keen pilot, he was attempting an endurance record from England to Cape Town when he was killed on the return route when his plane broke up pin stormy weather.

In October, Dorothy Paget withdrew her financial support for the Blower Bentley project after ongoing unreliability and only limited success. Philippe de Rothschild, knowing his identity was now revealed, retired from racing to build his family company into one of the great French wine labels.

== Official results ==
=== Finishers ===
Results taken from Quentin Spurring's book, officially licensed by the ACO Class Winners are in Bold text.

Pos	Class	No.	Team	Drivers	Chassis	Engine	Tyre	Target distance*	Laps
1	**>3.0**	**4**	**(United Kingdom) Bentley Motors Ltd**	**(United Kingdom) Woolf Barnato** **(United Kingdom) Glen Kidston**	Bentley Speed Six	Bentley 6.6L S6	D	152 [B]	179
2	>3.0	2	(United Kingdom) Bentley Motors Ltd	(United Kingdom) Frank Clement (United Kingdom) Dick Watney	Bentley Speed Six	Bentley 6.6L S6	D	152 [B]	173
3	**3.0**	**15**	**(United Kingdom) Fox & Nicholl**	**(United Kingdom) Brian Lewis, Baron Essendon** **(United Kingdom) Hugh Eaton**	Talbot 90	Talbot 2.3L S6	D	137	162
4	3.0	16	(United Kingdom) Fox & Nicholl	(United Kingdom) Tim Rose-Richards (United Kingdom) Johnny Hindmarsh	Talbot 90	Talbot 2.3L S6	D	137	160
5	3.0**	23	(United Kingdom) Earl Howe (private entrant)	(United Kingdom) Earl Howe (United Kingdom) Leslie Callingham	Alfa Romeo 6C-1750; Super Sport	Alfa Romeo 1752cc S6 supercharged	D	137	159
6	**2.0****	**24**	**(United Kingdom) Lea-Francis Ltd**	**(United Kingdom) Kenneth Peacock** **(United Kingdom) Sammy Newsome**	Lea-Francis S-Type Hyper	Meadows 1495cc S4 supercharged	D	134 [B]	140
7	**1.5**	**25**	**(France) M. Mareuse** (private entrant)	**(France) Marguerite Mareuse** **(France) Odette Siko**	Bugatti T40	Bugatti 1496cc S4	E	130	132
8	**1.0**	**27**	**(France) SA des Automobiles Tracta**	**(France) Jean-Albert Grégoire** **(France) Fernand Vallon**	Tracta Type A	S.C.A.P. 988cc S4	D	121 [B]	128
9	1.0	26	(France) SA des Automobiles Tracta	(France) Roger Bourcier (France) Louis Debeugny	Tracta Type A	S.C.A.P. 988cc S4	D	122 [B]	123

=== Did not finish ===
Pos	Class	No	Team	Drivers	Chassis	Engine	Tyre	Target distance*	Laps	Reason
DNF	>3.0	8	(United Kingdom) Hon. Dorothy Paget	(United Kingdom) Dr Dudley Benjafield (Italy) Giulio Ramponi	Bentley 4½ Litre 'Blower'	Bentley 4.4L S4 supercharged	D	152	144	Engine (21 hr)
DNF	>3.0	9	(United Kingdom) Hon. Dorothy Paget	(United Kingdom) Sir Henry “Tim” Birkin (France) Jean Chassagne	Bentley 4½ Litre 'Blower'	Bentley 4.4L S4 supercharged	D	152	138	Engine (20 hr)
DNF	>3.0	1	(Weimar Republic) R. Caracciola (private entrant)	(Weimar Republic) Rudolf Caracciola (Weimar Republic) Christian Werner	Mercedes-Benz SSK	Mercedes-Benz 7.1L S6 supercharged	D	152	85	Electrics (12 hr)
DNF	1.0	28	(United Kingdom) Huskinson & Fane Ltd (private entrant)	(United Kingdom) Robert Murton-Neale (United Kingdom) Jack Hicks	MG Midget M	MG 847cc S4	D	117	82	Engine (12 hr)
DNF	>3.0	6	(United States) R. Parke (private entrant)	(France) “Georges Philippe” (Philippe de Rothschild) (France) Edmond Bourlier	Stutz Model M Blackhawk	Stutz 5.4L S8	D	151	42	Rear axle (~7 hr)
DNF	>3.0	5	(France) É. Brisson (private entrant)	(France) Édouard Brisson (France) Louis Rigal	Stutz Model M Blackhawk	Stutz 5.4L S8	D	151 [B]	34	Fire (5 hr)
DNF	1.0	29	(United Kingdom) F. Samuelson (private entrant)	(United Kingdom) Francis Samuelson (United Kingdom) Freddy Kindell	MG Midget M	MG 847cc S4	D	117	28	Engine (5 hr)
DNF	>3.0	3	(United Kingdom) Bentley Motors Ltd	(United Kingdom) Sammy Davis (United Kingdom) Clive Dunfee	Bentley Speed Six	Bentley 6.6L S6	D	152 [B]	21	Accident (2 hr)
Sources:

- Note *: [B]= car also entered in the 1929-30 Biennial Cup.
- Note **: equivalent class for supercharging, with x1.3 modifier to capacity.

=== Did not start ===
Pos	Class	No	Team	Drivers	Chassis	Engine	Reason
DNS	1.5	20	(France) Bollack, Netter et Cie	(France) Charles Charrier (France) . Joucia	B.N.C. Vedette AER	AER 1999cc S6	Engine
DNS	>3.0	7	(United Kingdom) Hon. Dorothy Paget	(United Kingdom) Beris Harcourt-Wood (United Kingdom) Jack Dunfee	Bentley 4½ Litre 'Blower'	Bentley 4.4L S4 supercharged	Engine

=== 1930 index of performance ===
Pos	1929-30 Biennial Cup	Class	No.	Team	Drivers	Chassis	Index result
1	-	3.0	15	(United Kingdom) Fox & Nicholl	(United Kingdom) Brian Lewis, Baron Essendon (United Kingdom) Hugh Eaton	Talbot 90	1.176
2	1st	>3.0	4	(United Kingdom) Bentley Motors Ltd	(United Kingdom) Woolf Barnato (United Kingdom) Glen Kidston	Bentley Speed Six	1.172
3	-	3.0	16	(United Kingdom) Fox & Nicholl	(United Kingdom) Tim Rose-Richards (United Kingdom) Johnny Hindmarsh	Talbot 90	1.164
4	-	3.0	23	(United Kingdom) Earl Howe (private entrant)	(United Kingdom) Earl Howe (United Kingdom) Leslie Callingham	Alfa Romeo 6C-1750; Super Sport	1.156
5	2nd	>3.0	2	(United Kingdom) Bentley Motors Ltd	(United Kingdom) Frank Clement (United Kingdom) Dick Watney	Bentley Speed Six	1.133
6	3rd	1.0	27	(France) SA des Automobiles Tracta	(France) Jean-Albert Grégoire (France) Fernand Vallon	Tracta Type A	1.054
7	4th	2.0	24	(United Kingdom) Lea-Francis Ltd	(United Kingdom) Kenneth Peacock (United Kingdom) Sammy Newsome	Lea-Francis S-Type Hyper	1.041
8	-	1.5	25	(France) M. Mareuse (private entrant)	(France) Marguerite Mareuse (France) Odette Siko	Bugatti T40	1.016
9	5th	1.0	26	(France) SA des Automobiles Tracta	(France) Roger Bourcier (France) Louis Debeugny	Tracta Type A	1.009

=== Class winners ===
Class	Winning car	Winning drivers
Over 3-litre	#4 Bentley Speed Six	Barnato / Kidston *
2 to 3-litre	#15 Talbot 90	Lewis / Eaton *
1500 to 2000cc	#24 Lea-Francis S-Type Hyper	Peacock / Newsome
1000 to 1500cc	#25 Bugatti T40	Mareuse / Siko
Up to 1000cc	#27 Tracta Type A	Grégoire / Vallon
*Note *: setting a new class distance record.

=== Statistics ===
- Fastest Lap – H. Birkin, #9 Bentley 4½ Litre 'Blower'– 6:48secs; 144.36 km/h (89.70 mph)
- Winning Distance – 2,930.66 km (1,821.03 mi)
- Winner's Average Speed – 122.11 km/h (75.88 mph)
