= Dunfee =

Dunfee may refer to:

== People ==
- Clive Dunfee, British race car driver
- Evan Dunfee, Canadian race walker
- Jack Dunfee, British race car driver
- Nora Dunfee, American Broadway and film actress

== Places ==
- Dunfee, Indiana, an unincorporated community in Whitley County
