= MG Cars =

Car brand and former British car company

MG
- Logo used from 1990 to 2010
- Product type: Automobile
- Current owner: SAIC Motor
- Country: United Kingdom
- Markets: Worldwide
- Previous owners: 1924–1930: Morris Garages Limited; 1930–1952: M.G. Car Company Limited; 1952–1967: British Motor Corporation; 1967–1968: British Motor Holdings; 1968–1986: British Leyland; 1986–2000: Rover Group; 2000–2005: MG Rover Group; 2005–2007: Nanjing Automobile Group
- Website: mg.co.uk

MG is a British automotive marque founded by Cecil Kimber in the 1920s, owned by Chinese automobile manufacturer SAIC Motor since 2007. M.G. Car Company Limited was the British sports car manufacturer, existing between 1930 and 1972, that made the marque well known.

MG cars had their roots in a 1920s sales promotion sideline of Morris Garages, a retail sales and service centre in Oxford belonging to William Morris. The business's manager, Cecil Kimber, modified standard production Morris Oxfords and added MG Super Sports to the plate at the nose of the car. A separate M.G. Car Company Limited was incorporated in July 1930. It remained Morris's personal property until 1 July 1935, when he sold it to his holding company, Morris Motors Limited.

MG underwent many changes in ownership over the years. Morris's Nuffield Organization merged with Austin to create the British Motor Corporation Limited (BMC) in 1952. Its activities were renamed MG Division of BMC in 1967, and so it was a component of the 1968 merger that created British Leyland Motor Corporation (BLMC). The MG marque continued to be used by the successors of BLMC: British Leyland, the Rover Group and, by the start of 2000, the MG Rover Group, which entered receivership in 2005.

The MG marque, along with other assets of MG Rover, was purchased by Nanjing Automobile Group (which merged into SAIC Motor in 2007). Production of MG vehicles restarted in 2007 in China under Chinese ownership. The first new MG model in the United Kingdom for 16 years, the MG6, was launched on 26 June 2011, and by 2022, MG Motor had become the fastest growing car brand in the United Kingdom.

== M.G. Car Company (1930–1972) ==
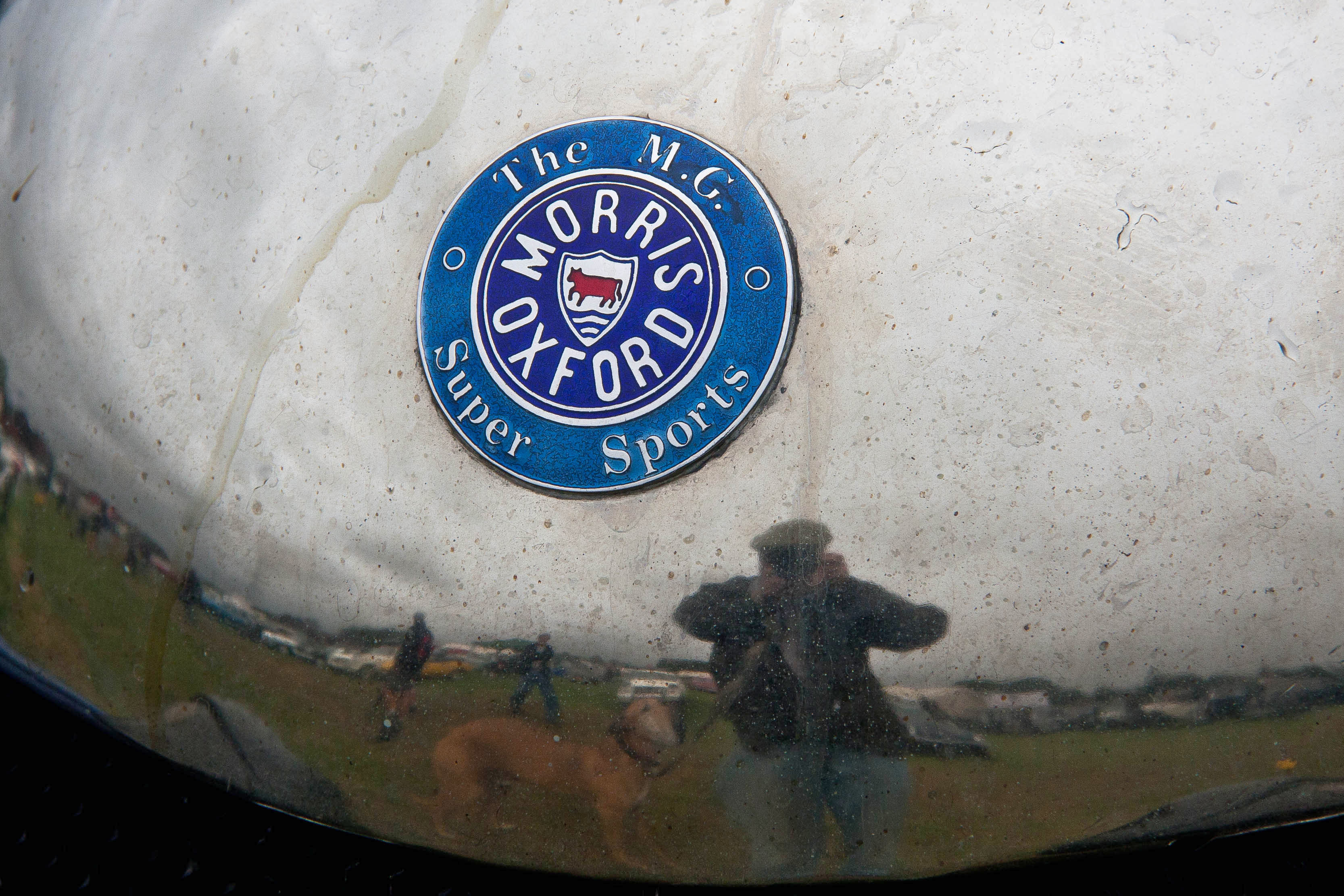
Enamelled badge on an early MG car

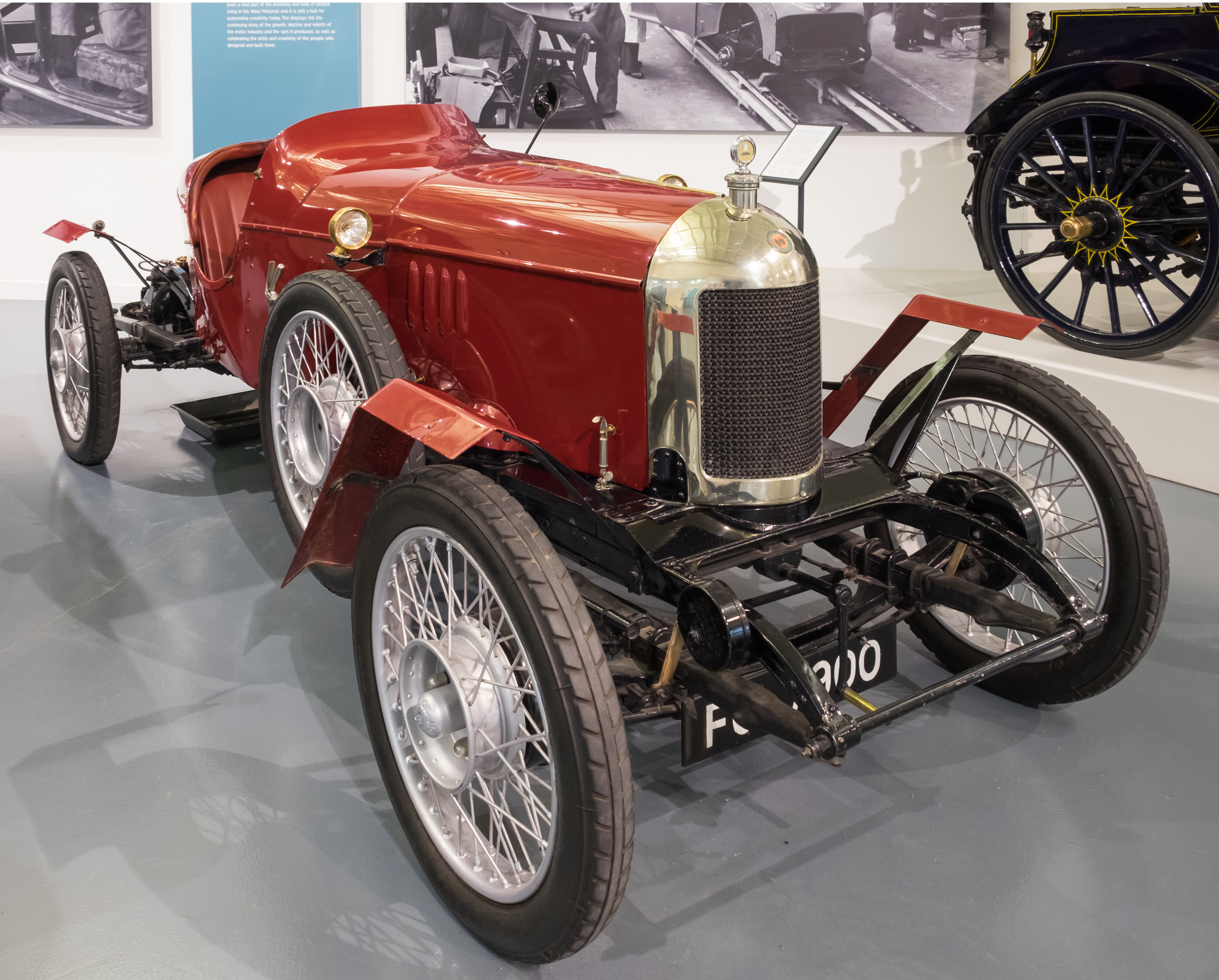
1925 'Old Number One' with body by Carbodies

William Morris's Morris Garages in Longwall Street, Oxford, was the Oxford agent for his Morris cars. Cecil Kimber joined the dealership as its sales manager in 1921 and was promoted to general manager in 1922. Kimber began promoting sales by producing his own special versions of Morris cars.

Debate remains as to when MG car production started. Although the first cars, rebodied Morris models that used coachwork from Carbodies of Coventry and known as "Kimber Specials", bore both Morris and MG badges. Reference to MG with the octagon badge appears in an Oxford newspaper from November 1923, and the MG Octagon was registered as a trademark by Morris Garages on 1 May 1924. Morris Garages assembled its cars in premises in Alfred Lane, Oxford. Demand soon caused a move to larger premises in Bainton Road in September 1925, sharing space with the Morris radiator works. Continuing expansion meant another move in 1927 to a separate factory in Edmund Road, Cowley, Oxford, near the main Morris factory, and for the first time, it was possible to include a production line.

In 1928, the company had become large enough to warrant an identity separate from the original Morris Garages, and The M.G. Car Company was used from March of that year. In October, for the first time, a stand was taken at the London Motor Show. Space soon ran out again, and a search for a permanent home led to the lease of part an old leather factory in Abingdon, Oxfordshire, in 1929. A limited liability company named M.G. Car Company was incorporated on 21 July 1930.

Kimber stayed with the company until 1941, when he fell out with Morris over procuring wartime work and was summarily dismissed. He died in February 1945, in the King's Cross railway accident.

=== Under the Nuffield Organization ===
William Morris owned MG personally. In a re-arrangement of his various personal holdings, Morris sold MG in 1935 to Morris Motors (itself the leading member of his Morris Organisation, later called the Nuffield Organization).

=== Under the British Motor Corporation (BMC) ===
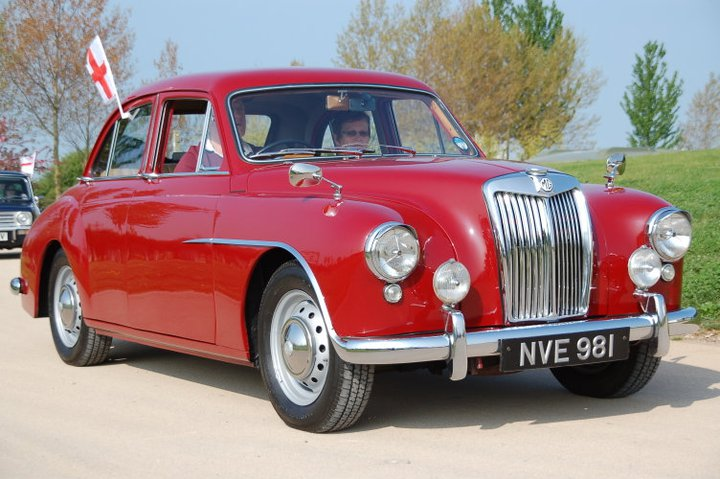
1955 ZA Magnette

The M.G. Car Company Limited was absorbed along with Morris into The British Motor Corporation Limited (BMC), created in 1952 as a merger of Morris Motors Limited and The Austin Motor Company Limited. Long-time service manager John Thornley took over as general manager, guiding the company through its best years until his retirement in 1969. Under BMC, several MG models were no more than badge-engineered versions of other marques, with the main exception being the small MG sports cars. BMC merged with Jaguar Cars in September 1966, and that December, the new company was named British Motor Holdings (BMH). BMH merged with the Leyland Motor Corporation in 1968 to form British Leyland Motor Corporation (BLMC).

=== Under British Leyland Motor Corporation (BLMC) ===
By this point, MG was nothing more than a marque used by BLMC, and from about 1972, the name "M.G. Car Company Limited" ceased to be used.

== MG marque ==
The marque name originated from the initials of Morris Garages, William Morris's private retail sales and service company. The marque was in continuous use, except for the duration of the Second World War, from its inception in 1924 until 2005, and then from 2007 under Chinese ownership.

In the beginning, the marque was used predominantly for two-seater sports cars made at the M.G Car Company factory in Abingdon, some 10 miles (16 km) south of Oxford.

=== Under British Leyland (1968–1986) ===
Following partial nationalisation in 1975, BLMC became British Leyland (later just BL). British Leyland's management and engineering staff were predominantly from the former Leyland organisation, which included MG's historical close rival Triumph. Triumph was grouped into BL's Specialist Division, alongside Rover and Jaguar, while MG was retained with the other former BMC marques in the Austin-Morris Division, which otherwise made mass-production family cars. While new Triumph models such as the TR7 and the Dolomite were launched during the 1970s, no new MG models were introduced apart from the limited-production V8 version of the MGB. While the MG operation was profitable its profits were entirely offset by the huge losses accrued by the rest of the Austin-Morris division. Any funding to the Division within BL was allocated to mass market models which required it urgently, leaving MG with limited resources to develop and maintain its existing range of models, which became increasingly outdated. Amidst a mix of economic, internal and external politics, the Abingdon factory was shut down on 24 October 1980 as part of a drastic programme of cutbacks necessary to turn BL around after the turbulent 1970s. The last car built there was the MGB, and after the closure of the Abingdon plant, the MG marque was temporarily abandoned, and BL decided that there would be no immediate direct successor to the MGB or Midget.

Between 1982 and 1991, the MG marque used to badge-engineer sportier versions of Austin Rover's Metro, Maestro, and Montego ranges. The MG marque was not revived in its own right until 1992, with the MG RV8 – an updated MGB Roadster with a Rover V8 engine, which was previewed at the 1992 Birmingham Motor Show, with low-volume production commencing in 1993.

=== Under Rover Group (1986–2000) ===
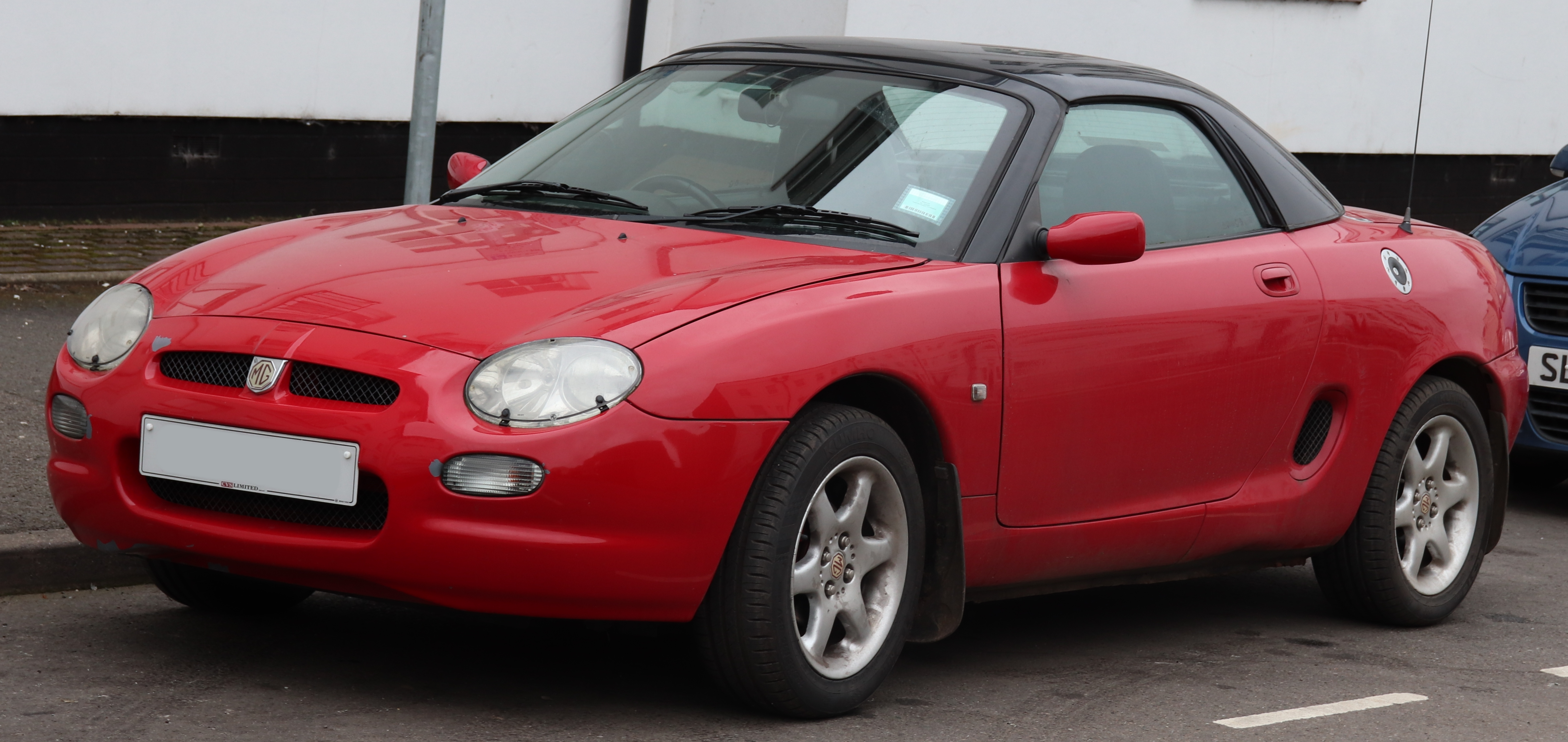
In 1995, the MG F became the first all-new MG since the MGB

After BL became the Rover Group in 1986, ownership of the MG marque passed to British Aerospace in 1988 and then in 1994 to BMW. The MG name was revived for a second time in 1992 with the launch of the MG RV8, followed by the mid-engined MG F in 1995, which proved to be more successful than the short-lived RV8.

=== Under MG Rover (2000–2006) ===
BMW sold the business in 2000 and the MG marque passed to the MG Rover Group based in Longbridge, Birmingham. The practice of selling unique MG sports cars alongside badge-engineered models (by now Rovers) continued. The Group went into receivership in 2005 and car production was suspended on 7 April 2005. As of 2003, the site of the former Abingdon factory was host to McDonald's and the Thames Valley Police with only the former office block still standing. The headquarters of the MG Car Club (established 1930) is situated next door.

In 2006, it was reported that an initiative called Project Kimber, led by David James, had entered talks with Nanjing to buy the MG marque to produce a range of sports cars based on the discontinued Smart Roadster design by DaimlerChrysler. No agreement was reached, which resulted in the AC Cars marque being adopted for the new model, instead. The project appeared dormant by 2009, and was not pursued.

=== Under MG Motor (2006–present) ===
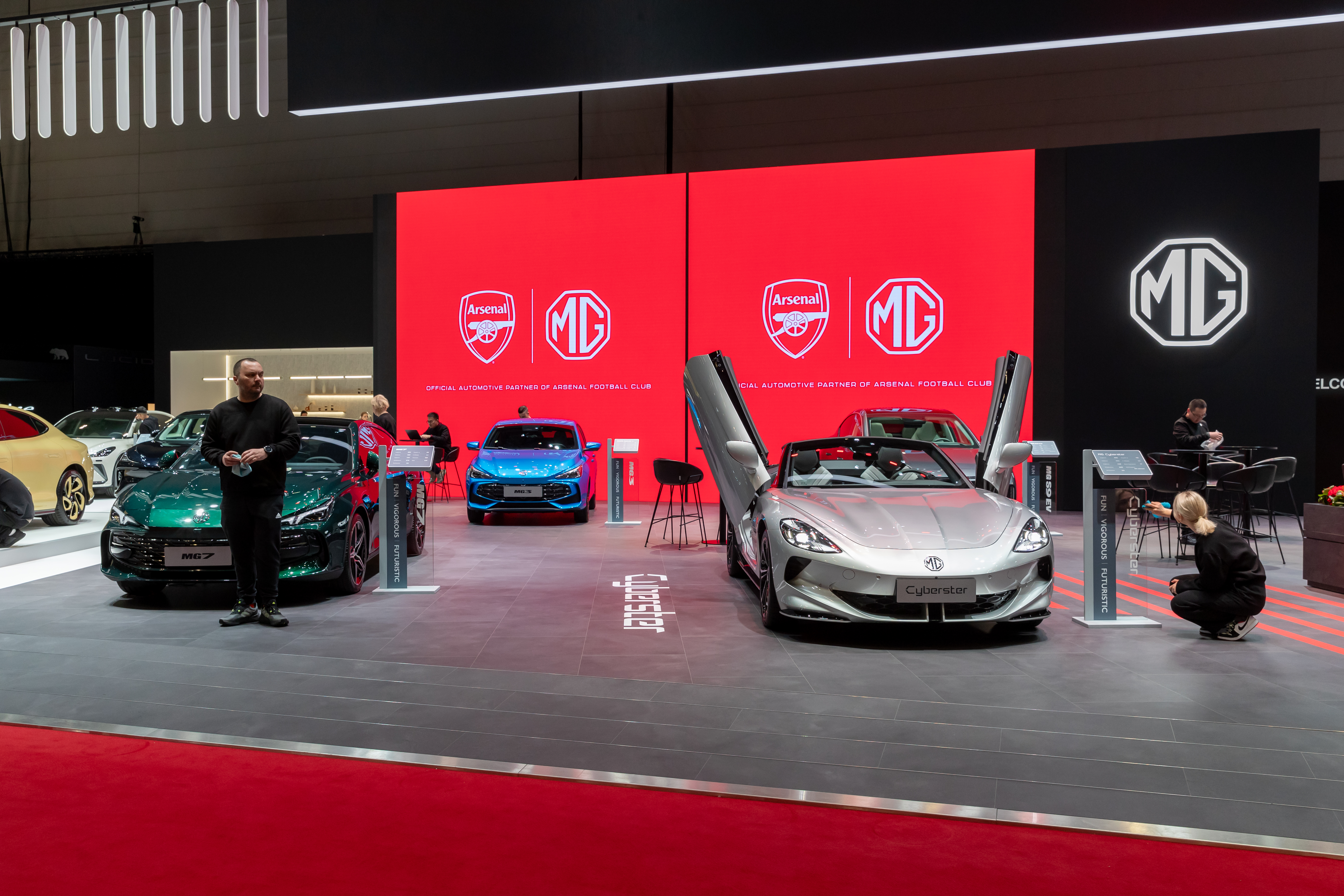
MG Motor stand at the 2024 Geneva International Motor Show

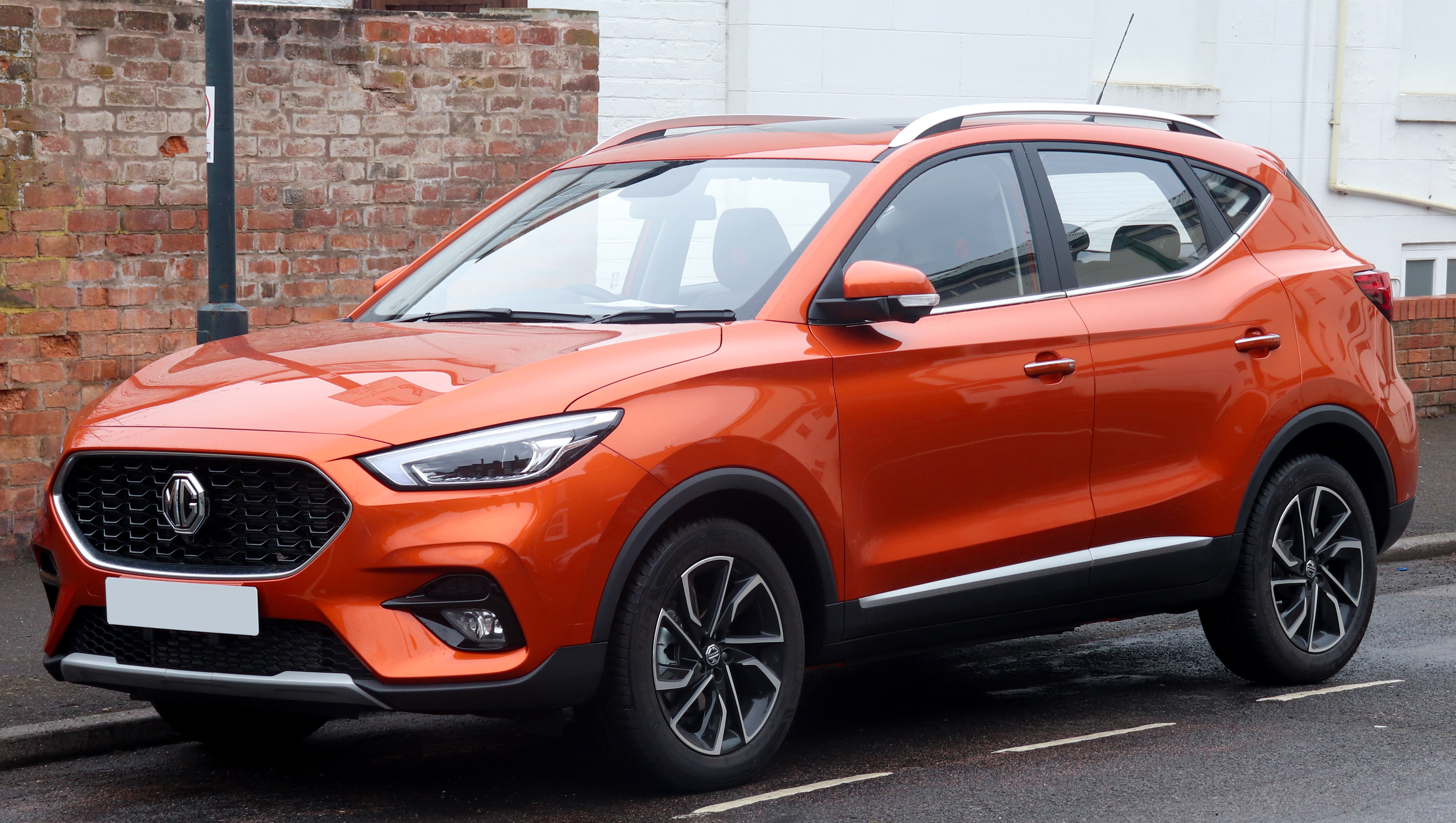
2022 MG ZS

On 22 July 2005, Chinese manufacturer Nanjing Automobile Group purchased the rights to the MG marque along with other assets of the MG Rover Group, forming NAC MG UK Limited. In 2007, Nanjing Automobile was acquired by another Chinese manufacturer SAIC Motor, and NAC MG UK Limited was renamed MG Motor UK Limited in 2009. Since then, the MG marque has been controlled by SAIC as a division within the company's passenger vehicle branch.

The first all-new MG model for 16 years, the MG6, was officially launched in June 2011, and was assembled in China and in UK at the Longbridge plant. In September 2016, MG Motor ended car production at the Longbridge plant. The company cites "improving production scale efficiencies" as the reason of the plant closure. Since then, MG vehicles had been imported from China into the UK.

Since the purchase of the marque, SAIC has designated MG as its main one internationally. In 2023, 88 percent of its sales were outside China. Aside from selling cars designed by parent company SAIC Motor for the MG marque, MG Motor also markets rebadged vehicles from SAIC such as Roewe and Maxus, and from corporate sibling SAIC-GM-Wuling.

The most popular MG Motor product in international markets is the MG ZS subcompact SUV, with cumulative sales of 999,612 units as of December 2023. It is one of the most exported cars from China. In 2023, MG Motor introduced its first new roadster, the Cyberster electric vehicle, which went on sale in 2024.

== Models ==
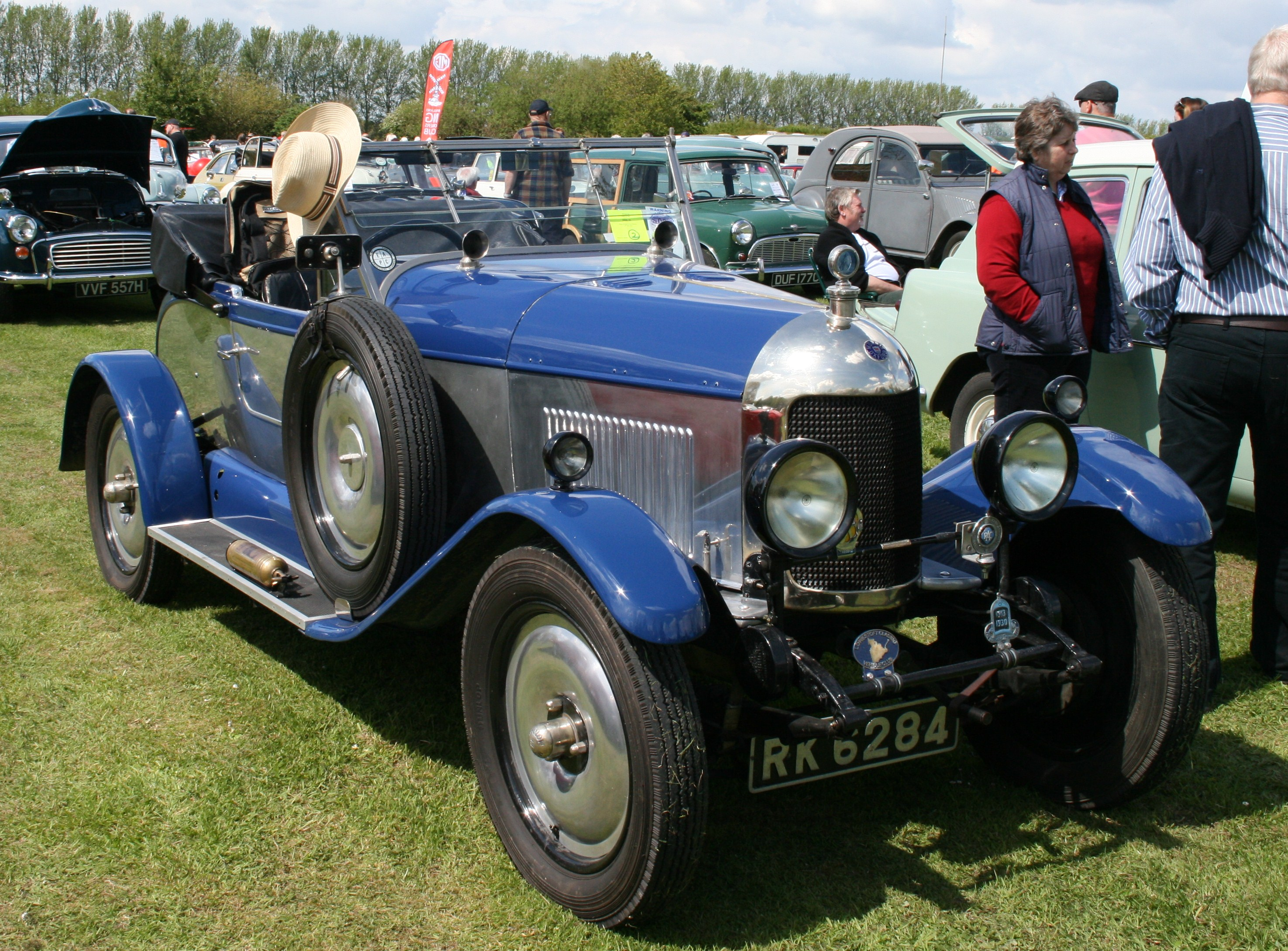
1926 14-28 open two-seater

The earliest model, the 1924 MG 14/28 consisted of a new sporting body on a Morris Oxford chassis. This car model continued through several versions following the updates to the Morris. The first car that can be described as a new MG, rather than a modified Morris was the MG 18/80 of 1928, which had a purpose-designed chassis and the first appearance of the traditional vertical MG grille. A smaller car was launched in 1929 with the first of a long line of Midgets starting with the M-Type based on a 1928 Morris Minor chassis. MG established a name for itself in the early days of the sport of international automobile racing. Beginning before and continuing after World War II, MG produced a line of cars known as the T-Series Midgets, which, post-war, were exported worldwide, achieving greater success than expected. These included the MG TC, MG TD, and MG TF, all of which were based on the pre-war MG TB, and updated with each successive model.

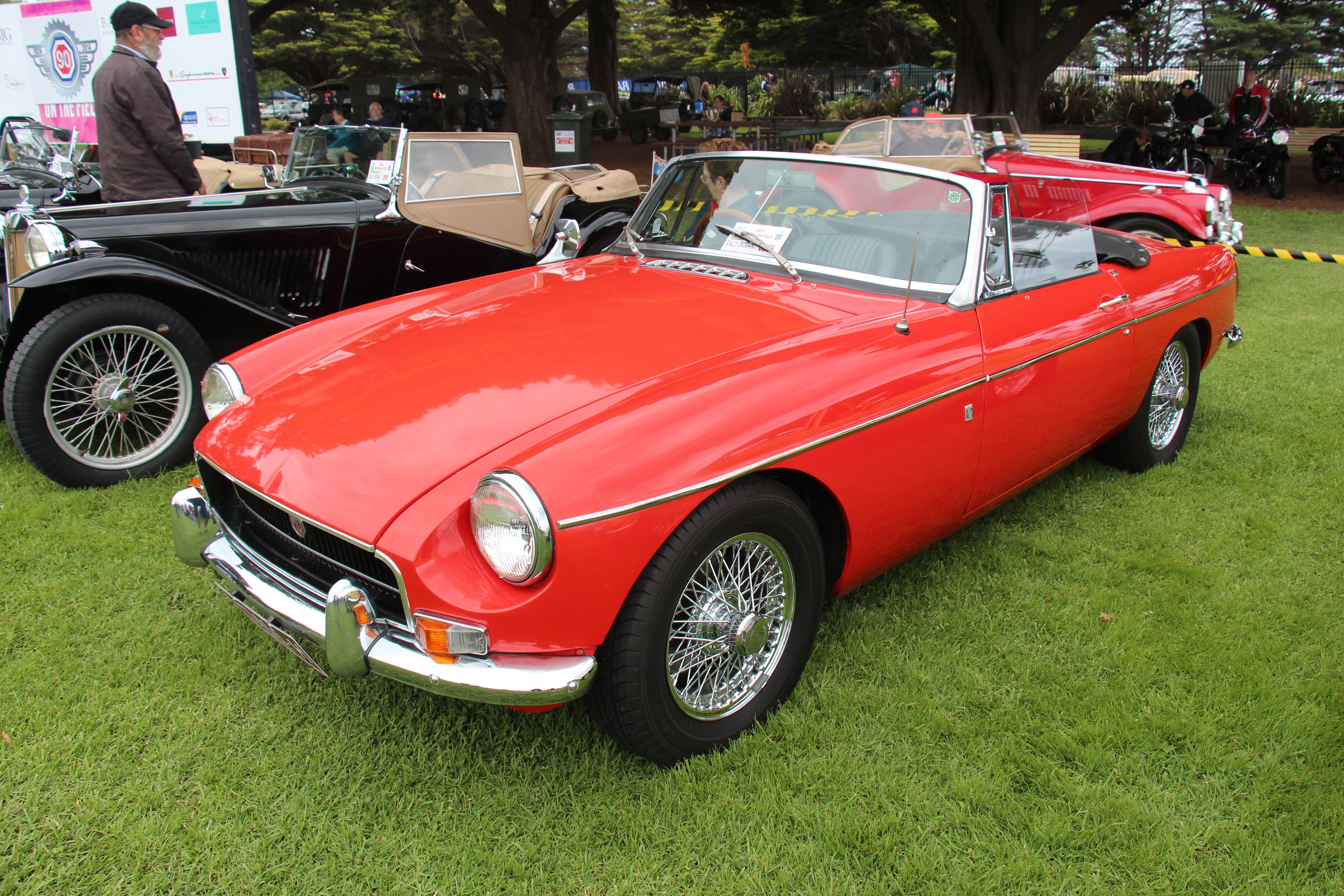
1970 MGB

MG departed from its earlier line of Y-Type saloons and pre-war designs and released the MGA in 1955. The MGB was released in 1962 to satisfy demand for a more modern and comfortable sports car. In 1965 the fixed head coupé (FHC) followed: the MGB GT. With continual updates, mostly to comply with increasingly stringent United States emissions and safety standards, the MGB was produced until 1980. Between 1967 and 1969 a short-lived model called the MGC was released. The MGC was based on the MGB body, but with a larger (and heavier) six-cylinder engine, and somewhat worse handling. MG also began producing the MG Midget in 1961. The Midget was a re-badged and slightly restyled second-generation Austin-Healey Sprite. To the dismay of many enthusiasts, the 1974 MGB was the last model made with chrome bumpers due to new United States safety regulations; the 1974½ bore thick black rubber bumpers that some claimed ruined the lines of the car. In 1973, the MGB GT V8 was launched with the ex-Buick Rover V8 engine and was built until 1976. As with the MGB, the Midget design was frequently modified until the Abingdon factory closed in October 1980 and the last of the range was made. The badge was also applied to versions of BMC saloons including the BMC ADO16, (as the MG 1100, 1275 and 1300) which was also available as a Riley, but with the MG pitched as slightly more "sporty".

The marque lived on after 1980 under BL, being used on a number of Austin saloons including the Metro, Maestro, and Montego. In New Zealand, the MG badge even appeared on the late 1980s Montego estate, called the MG 2.0 Si Wagon. There was a brief competitive history with a mid-engined, six-cylinder version of the Metro. The MG Metro finished production in 1990 on the launch of a Rover-only model. The MG Maestro and MG Montego remained on sale until 1991, when Rover cut production of these models to concentrate on the more modern 200 Series and 400 Series. High performance Rover Metro, 200 and 400 GTi models had gone on sale in late 1989 and throughout 1990 as the MG version of the Metro was discontinued in 1990 and the versions of the Maestro and Montego were axed in 1991.

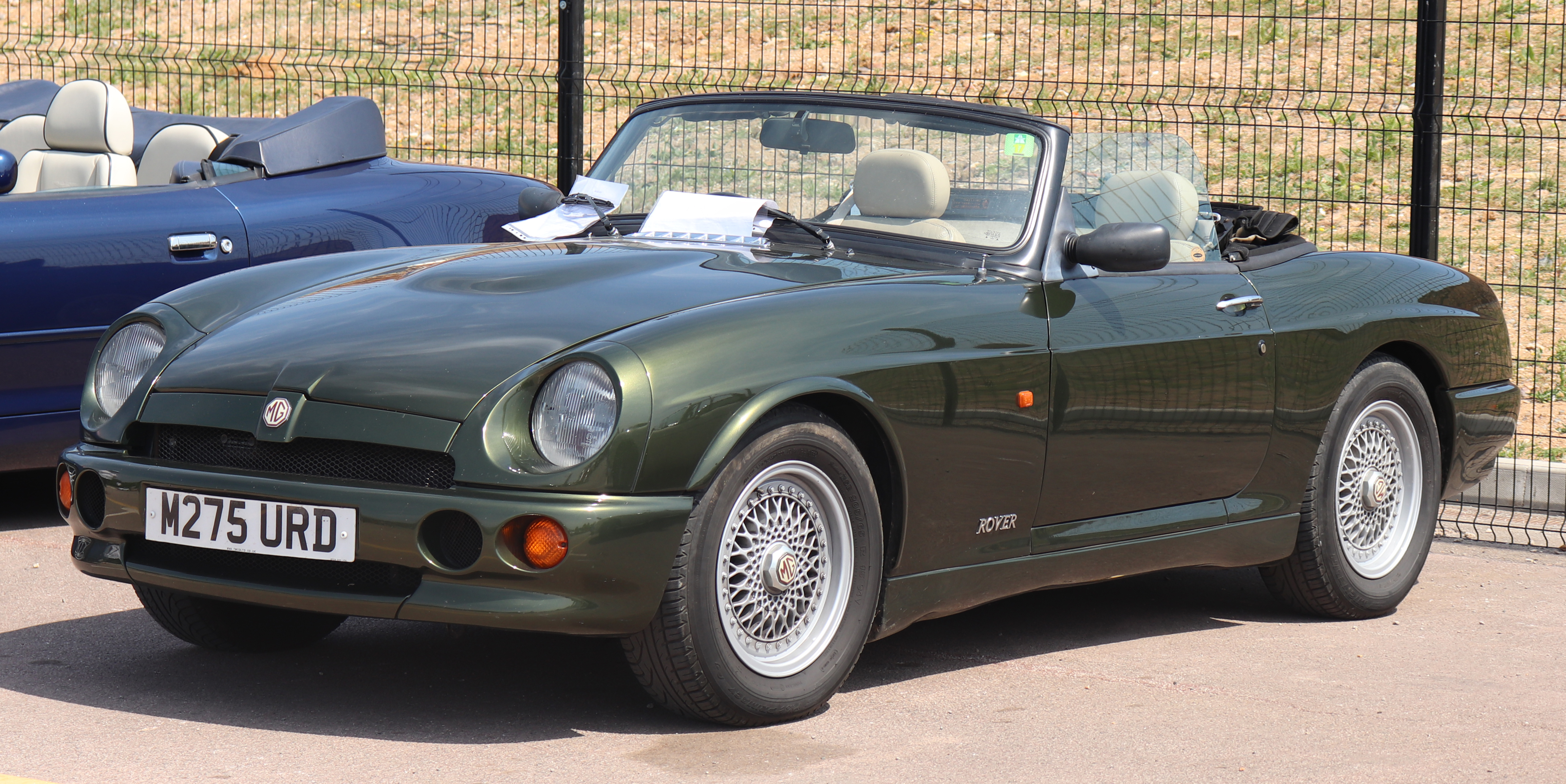
1994 MG RV8

The Rover Group revived the two-seater with the MG RV8 in 1992. The all-new MG F went on sale in 1995, becoming the first mass-produced "real" MG sports car since the MGB ceased production in 1980.

Following the May 2000 purchase of the MG and Rover marques by the Phoenix Consortium and the forming of the new MG Rover Group, the MG range was expanded in the summer of 2001 with the introduction of three sports models based on the contemporary range of Rover cars. The MG ZR was based on the Rover 25, the MG ZS on the Rover 45, and the MG ZT/ZT-T on the Rover 75.

The MG Rover Group purchased Qvale, which had taken over development of the De Tomaso Bigua. This car, renamed the Qvale Mangusta and already approved for sale in the United States, formed the basis of the MG XPower SV, an "extreme" V8-engined sports car. It was revealed in 2002 and went on sale in 2004.

== Motorsport ==
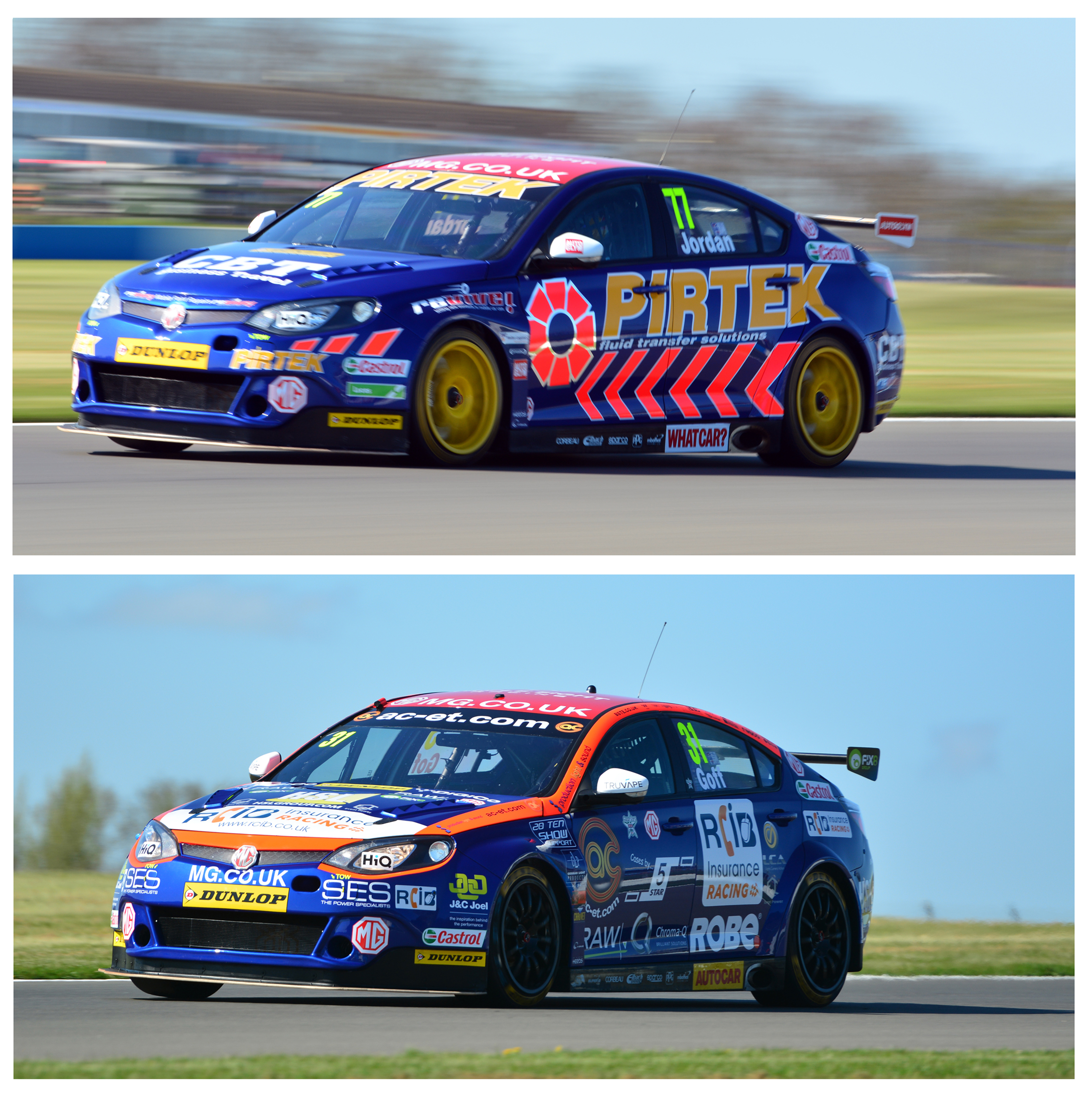
MG / Triple Eight British Touring Cars 2015

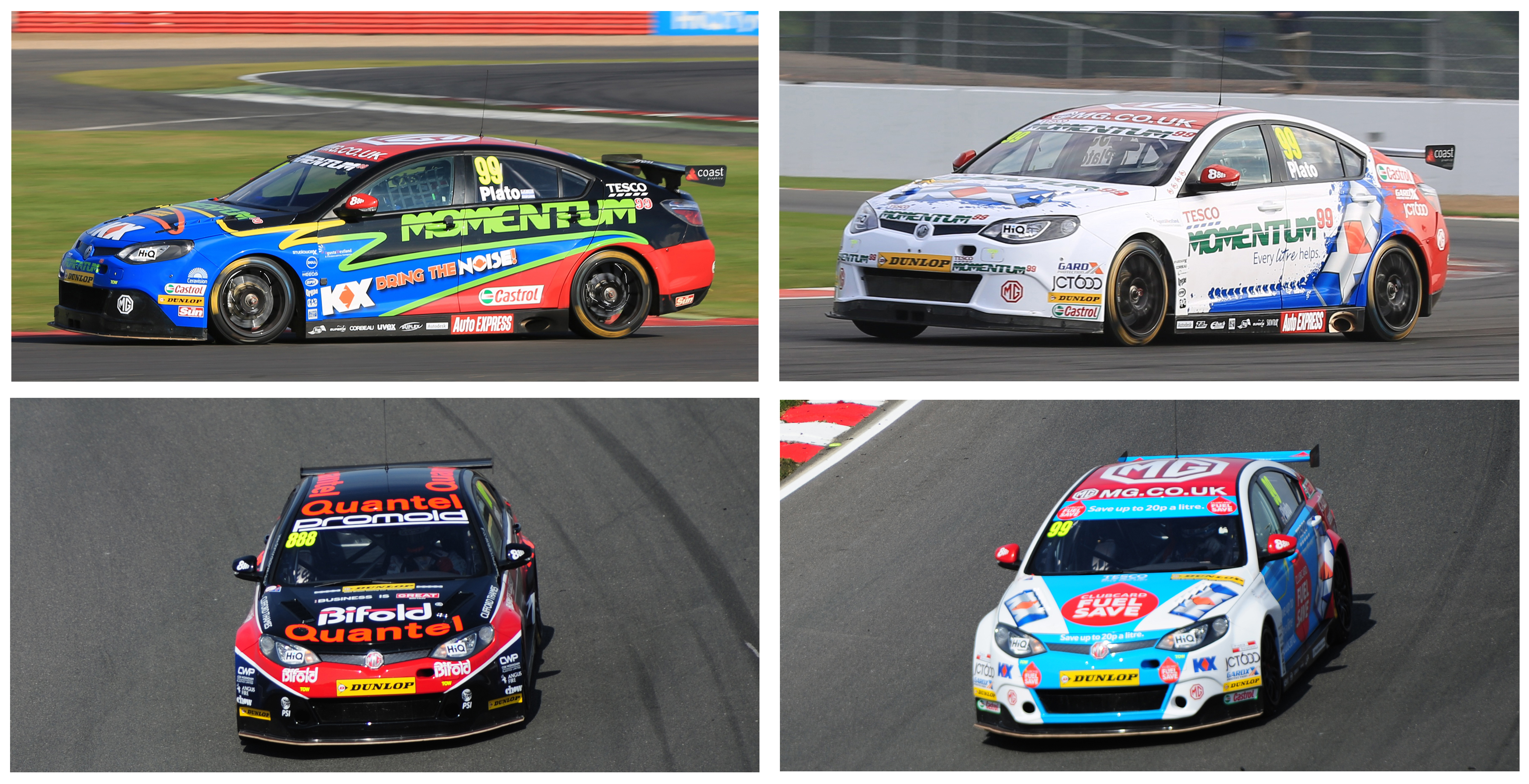
MG / Triple Eight British Touring Cars 2012–2014

From its earliest days MGs have been used in competition. From the early 1930s a series of dedicated racing cars such as the 1931 C-Type and 1934 Q-type were made and sold to enthusiasts who received considerable company assistance. MGs twice won the prestigious International 500 Miles Race at Brooklands, in 1931 thanks to R. T. Horton's special-bodied Midget (shared with Jack Bartlett), and in 1932 thanks to Eddie Hall in a Magnette. This activity stopped in 1935 when MG was formally merged with Morris Motors and the Competition Department closed down. A series of experimental cars had also been made allowing Captain George Eyston to take several world speed records. In spite of the formal racing ban, speed record attempts continued with Goldie Gardner exceeding 200 mph (320 km/h) in the 1100 cc EX135 in 1939.

After the Second World War record-breaking attempts restarted with 500 cc and 750 cc records being taken in the late 1940s. A decision was also taken to return to racing and a team of MGAs was entered in the tragedy-laden 1955 24 Hours of Le Mans race, the best car achieving 12th place. The British Motor Corporation (BMC) competition department was also based at the Abingdon plant, producing many winning rally and race cars, until the Abingdon factory closed and MGB production ceased in the autumn of 1980.

Prior to the use of the Toyota Tundra silhouette in the Craftsman Truck Series, MG was reported as the last foreign marque used in NASCAR. It was driven in 1963 by Smokey Cook.

In 2001 MG re-launched their motor sport campaign to cover the 24 Hours of Le Mans (MG-Lola EX257), British Touring Car Championship (BTCC) (MG ZS), British and World Rally Championships and MG Independent British Rally Championship (MG ZR). The Le Mans team failed to win the endurance race in 2001 and 2002 and quit in 2003. MG Sport+Racing raced in the British Touring Car Championships with the MG ZS between 2001 and 2003 as a factory team. In 2004 WSR raced the MG ZS as a privateer team. After three years without a major sponsor, WSR teamed up with RAC in 2006 and the team was called Team RAC. In 2007 an MG ZR driven by BRC Stars Champion Luke Pinder won class N1 on Britain's round of the World Rally championship. Wales Rally GB. The MG British Rally Challenge still runs today despite the liquidation in 2005.

In 2004 plans to race in the Deutsche Tourenwagen Masters (DTM) with a heavily modified V8 powered ZT supertouring car were cancelled due to MG Rover's liquidation in April 2005.

In January 2012, MG Motor announced that it would enter the 2012 British Touring Car Championship through the newly established MG KX Momentum Racing team. In its debut season the team ran two MG6s driven by Jason Plato and Andy Neate. Jason ended the season in third place, with the car yet to find its foot in wet conditions.

The team returned in 2013 with Sam Tordoff driving, who performed well in his debut year having joined through the KX Academy scheme. Plato once again came third, with Tordoff sixth.

MG won the 2014 Manufacturer's Championship to break Honda's four-year reign. After just three years of competition, the MG6 GT sealed the title by 95 points at the season finale at Brands Hatch. Drivers Plato and Tordoff racked up seven wins and 20 podiums in the 30-race calendar. Plato finished the Driver's Championship in second place, behind Colin Turkington, while Tordoff finished seventh. In 2014, a third MG6 GT was on the grid, driven by Marc Hynes—also maintained by Triple Eight but in a new livery that didn't resemble the other two MG cars. MG came second in the Constructors Championship in 2015, with Andrew Jordan leading the MG team by finishing the season fifth.

== See also ==
- List of car manufacturers of the United Kingdom

== General sources ==
- Northey, Tom. "MG: A Great Sporting Name", in Ward, Ian, Executive Editor. World of Automobiles, Volume 12, pp. 1333–41. London: Orbis, 1974.
