= Jack Bartlett =

British racing driver and car dealer (1907–1983)

- Born: John Hastings Bartlett; 25 August 1904 Rotherhithe, London
- Died: 19 August 1983 (aged 78) St Brelade, Channel Islands

John Hastings "Jack" Bartlett (25 August 1904 – 19 August 1983) was a British car dealer and amateur racing driver.

== Racing career ==
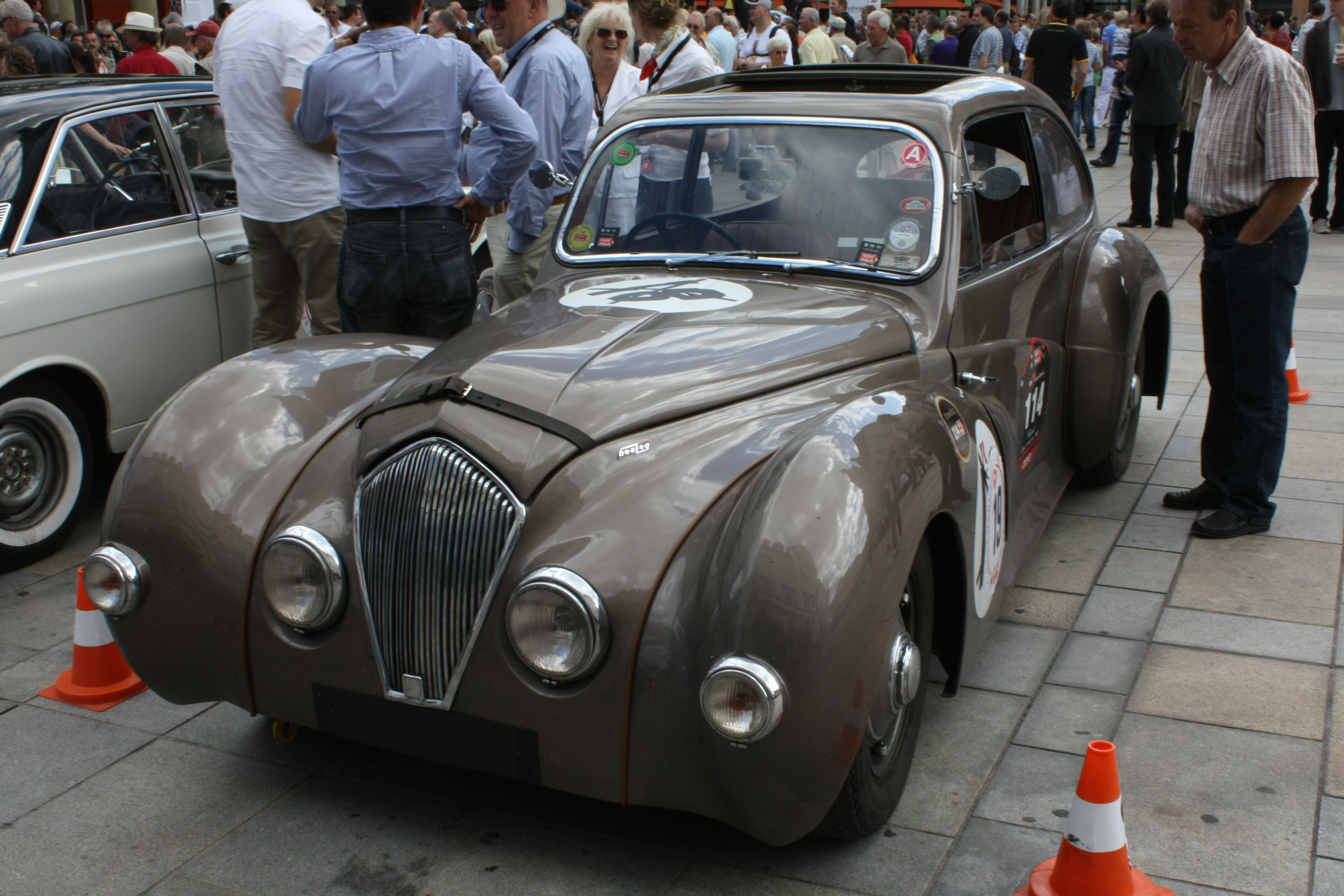
The Healey Elliott Saloon with which Bartlett took part in the 1949 Le Mans 24 Hours

Educated at St Paul's School, London, where one of his fellow pupils was future racer Harold Purdy, Bartlett started trading in motorcycles while still at school, and he made a racing debut with an NSU motorcycle which his father had bought for him in 1920. With the trading provfith the profits made he entered a few motorcycle races at Brooklands. In 1928 he quit his brewing industry job to work at University Motors, of which Earl Howe was a director, before starting his own car business, through which he obtained a pair of Bugatti Type 39s. He entered them for a pair of races at Brooklands in 1930 but both broke down on the starting line.

Disgusted with the Bugattis, he instead stepped down to a 1,100cc Salmson, and he enjoyed success with it at both Brooklands and Southport, where he twice won the 100 mile race on the sand course. His results persuaded Dick Shuttleworth to recruit him alongside Percy Wentworth Hope-Johnstone, who was using the nom de course Lockwood, to race an Arrol-Aster at the 1931 24 Hours of Le Mans, but the 2.3 litre car was unreliable and slow, and Bartlett was at the wheel when it finally broke down on the Mulsanne Straight at 8am, all water in the radiator having boiled away.

His greatest honour came in the 1932 International 500 Miles Race, sharing R. T. Horton's MG C-type Midget single-seater to an unexpected handicap victory. During the race Bartlett had the alarming experience of having to snap around the body of Clive Dunfee, who had been killed in an accident in his Bentley.

By 1933 he had adapted the Salmson to the extent that he called it the Bartlett-Salmson - conveniently also advertising his business - and he made another attempt at the 500 Miles race, this time in a Riley Nine; in practice, he narrowly avoided serious injury after the engine seized, sending him up to the lip of the bank before sliding down to a ditch, following which experience George Eyston - who had seen the whole incident - invited him for a brandy.

He entered the first Mannin Beg in 1933 in his MG K3 Magnette, but did not start. The following year he bought an Alfa Romeo 2300 Monza, finishing 7th (on handicap) and 4th (on speed) in the British Empire Trophy, sharing the drive with Charles Brackenbury.

In 1936, he took on an Alta from Geoffrey Taylor, in which he undertook his only voiturette formula race of any note, namely the 1937 Brooklands Mountain Championship, in which he finished 3rd; although the field was small field, every other starter was also a Grand Prix driver.

After the Second World War, in which he served in the Royal Air Force, Bartlett returned briefly to racing, driving at the Brighton Speed Trials in a 2.9l Alfa Romeo 8C monoposto which he had intended to use at Brooklands in 1939. He also made his last racing appearance at the 1949 24 Hours of Le Mans, driving a Healey Elliott with Nigel Mann; a slow first stint, due to an oil leak, prevented classification as a finisher, although the 180 laps the car achieved would otherwise have placed it 13th.

== Car dealing ==
Bartlett ran a garage at Notting Hill from the 1920s, and was soon considered the top dealer in sportscars, including Alfa Romeo 2300s and Bugattis before the war; indeed many of the cars he raced were from his stock. He eventually retired to Cannes, France, but made frequent trips - by road - between there and London. He died while on holiday in Jersey.

== Le Mans record ==
Year	Team	Co-Drivers	Car	Class	Laps	Pos.	Class Pos.
1931	(United Kingdom) Dick Shuttleworth	(United Kingdom) Percy Wentworth Hope-Johnstone	Arrol-Aster	3.0	95	ret	ret
1949	(United Kingdom) Jack Bartlett	(United Kingdom) Nigel Mann	Healey	3.0	95	n/c	n/c
