= International 500 Miles Race =

British motor race, 1929–1937

- Venue: Brooklands
- First race: 1929
- Last race: 1937
- Distance: 500 miles, in 1937 500 km
- Laps: 181
- Most wins (driver): John Cobb (2); Freddie Dixon (2)
- Most wins (manufacturer): Napier-Railton (2); Bentley (2); MG (2); Riley (2)

A map of Brooklands after the construction of the Campbell circuit, also showing the original Outer Circuit including the Finishing Straight.

The International 500 Miles Race was a Formule Libre handicap motor race, first held in 1929. It was held on the Brooklands outer circuit, and was the fastest motor race in the world in the 1930s.

== History ==
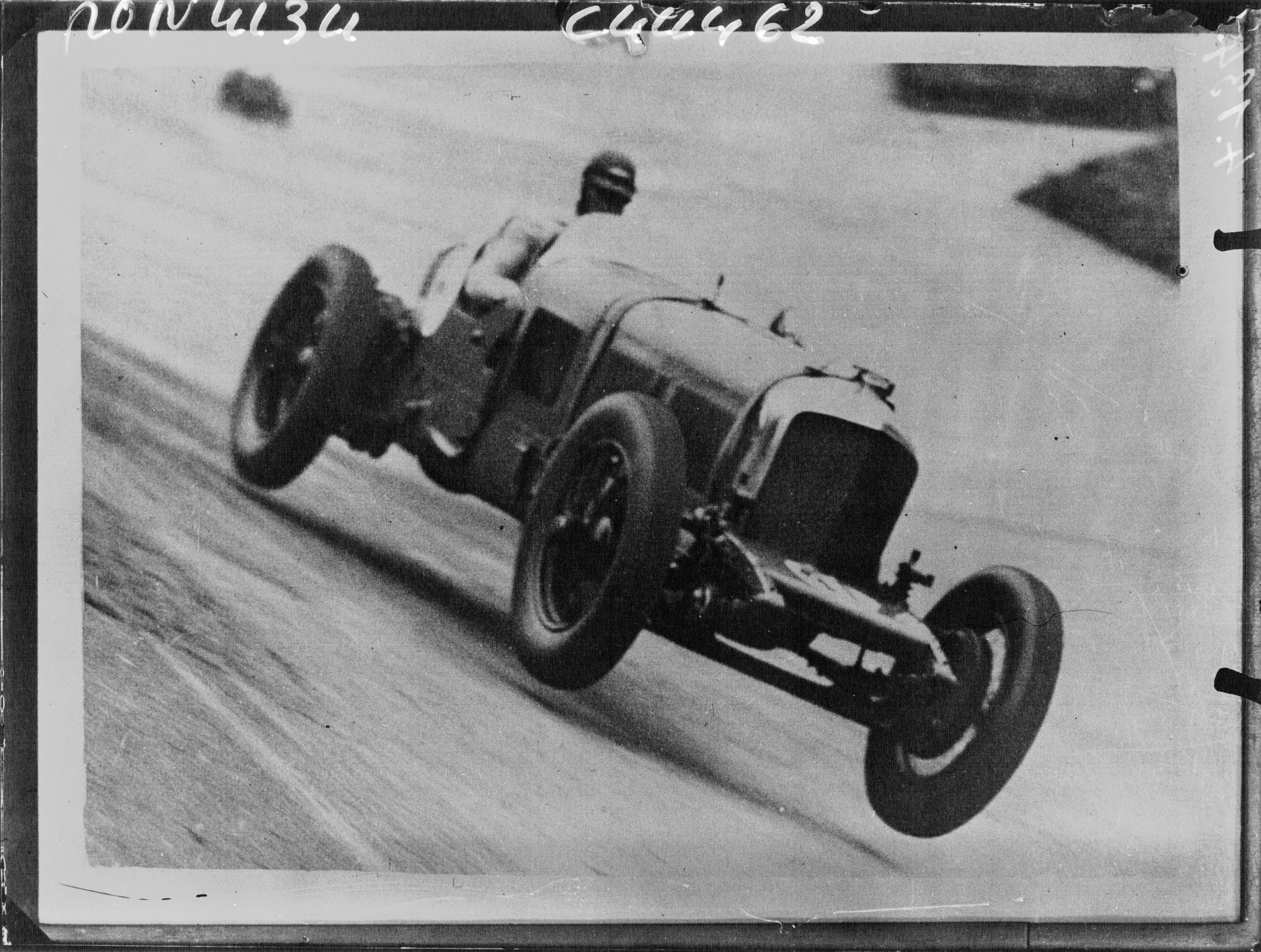
Clive Dunfee during the 1932 race

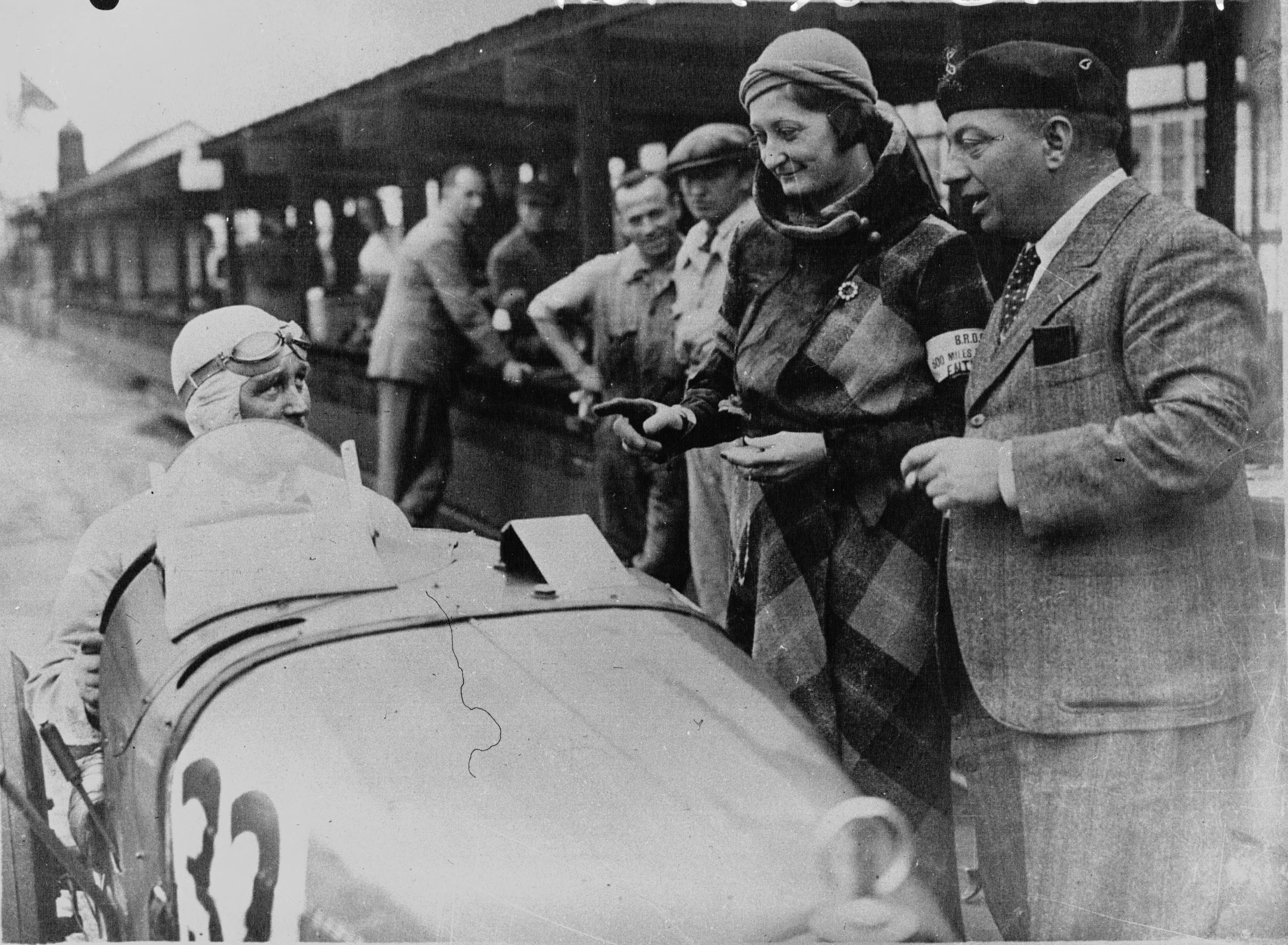
Stanisław Czaykowski in his Bugatti Type 51 at the 1932 race, in which he retired

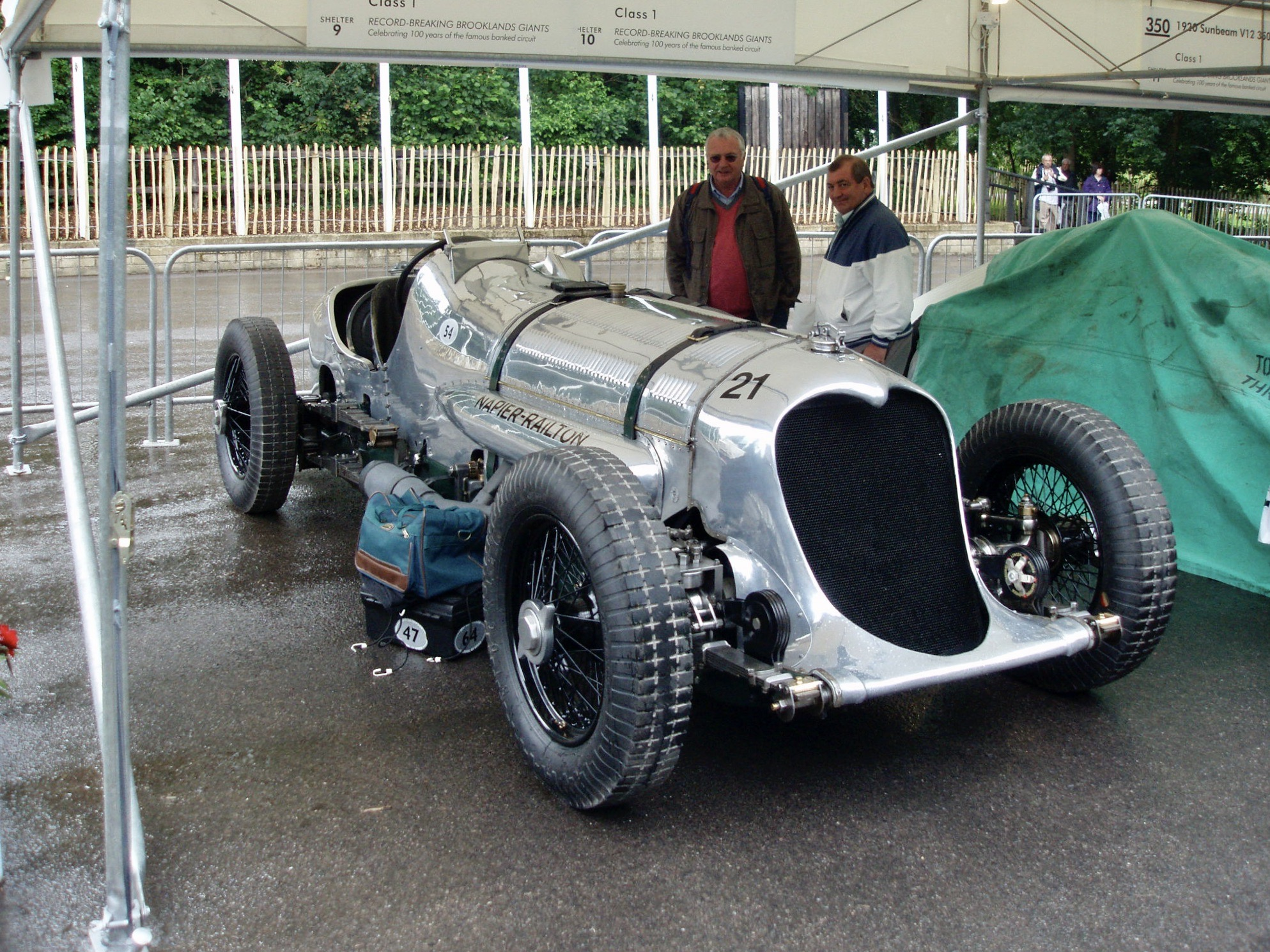
Napier-Railton, twice the winning car, at the Goodwood Festival of Speed 2007

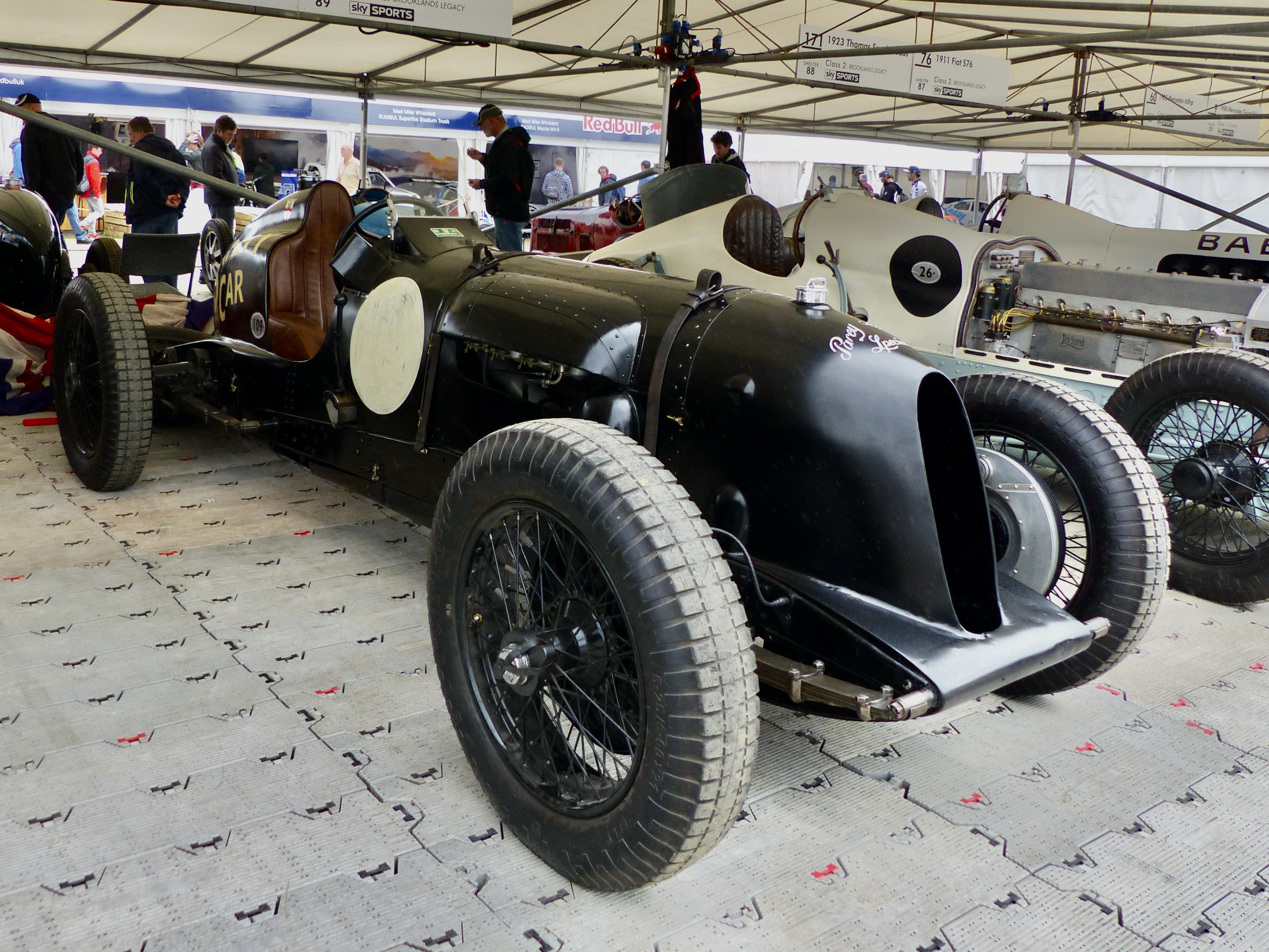
Pacey-Hassan Bentley Special, 2nd in 1936 and 8th in 1937, at the Goodwood Festival of Speed 2017

The race was instituted by the British Racing Drivers Club and first held in 1929; the race was run on a class handicap basis, with the slowest class cars (usually for cars with engine capacity under 750 c.c.) being let off first, other classes being released in turn as per the handicappers' estimate of performance differential. In the 1933 race for example the first car to set off - an unsupercharged MG Midget driven by J. G. C. Low - was set off on its own, with 15 cars (including supercharged Midgets) being released 39 minutes later, and the one car on "scratch" - Kaye Don's 4.9 litre Bugatti - starting 1 hour and 18 minutes after Low had got underway.

The first winners were Frank Clement and Jack Barclay in a 4.5 litre Bentley, although the fastest pairing was Sammy Davis and Clive Dunfee in a Bentley Speed Six, their speed earning them second on handicap. The fastest car in 1930 was also a 4.5 litre Bentley, driven by Dr Dudley Benjafield and Eddie Hall, finishing the 500 miles at an average speed of over 112mph, but the honours went to Sammy Davis and the Earl of March, who led from start to finish, and who averaged 83mph in their 747cc Austin 7, although speeds were depressed by "vile" conditions early on. The Austin ran trouble-free throughout the race, only requiring stops for fuel and tyres, and later in the year broke several class speed records in a run at Brooklands.

=== Glory years ===
By 1931, the race had "become firmly established as one of the leading events of the racing calendar", and began to attract many continental drivers, including Freddy Zehender in 1931, Stanislaus Czaykowski in 1932, Juan Zanelli in 1933, and Per Wiktor Widengren on a number of occasions. In 1931 the handicaps were tweaked to favour the larger cars. The effect was that Jack Dunfee and Cyril Paul took handicap and overall honours in their 6-litre Bentley "Old Number One" entered by Woolf Barnato, setting a world-record speed of over 118mph.

The 1932 race saw a surprise as Ron Horton and Jack Bartlett took the honours in Horton's Jarvis-bodied streamlined 746 c.c. MG Midget, overtaking the Talbot of the Hon. Brian Lewis and John Cobb on the handicap as twilight took over, the chequered flag coming as a surprise to spectators. The race was marred by tragedy as Clive Dunfee, driving an 8-litre Bentley entered by Woolf Barnato, was killed when he went over the top of the Members' Banking, Bartlett having to swerve around the body. The prize money went to Horton, as car owner; Bartlett received a plaque.

In 1933, Eddie Hall - who would later run the 24 Hours of Le Mans on his own - took a solo victory in a streamlined MG Magnette, by keeping a steady pace to minimize the amount of pit time; his girlfriend (later second wife) Joan controlled Hall's schedule from the Brooklands pits. The race however was temporarily stopped after a hideous accident which took the life of Michael Bower Watson, whose MG C-type overturned just after a refuelling stop, and caught fire. Motorcycle racer Freddie Dixon took note of Hall's achievement, and, in 1934, he replicated the feat, winning solo in his 2l Riley, also winning outright as attrition and bad weather affected the larger capacity cars; he only took the lead with 2 laps to go, after Percy Maclure in the leading works Riley suffered a broken exhaust.

The 1935 race went to the gigantic Napier-Railton special, its 24 litre heft tailored for Brooklands, in the hands of Cobb and Tim Rose-Richards, at a speed of over 121mph, aided by a damaged track surface, which oddly compromised the smaller cars more than the larger cars. Women racers were allowed to compete in the race for the first time, the B.R.D.C. inviting Gwenda Stewart, Doreen Evans, "Bill" Wisdom, and Kay Petre to participate. Only 5 cars were flagged as finishers, and of the women only Wisdom was running at the end, having completed 163 laps in her MG R-type with A. G. Phipps (and heading the Class H category for the smallest cars).

=== Decline and shortening ===
By 1936 manufacturer interest in the race was waning, as the gruelling nature of the event, the bumpy Brooklands track, and the specialist nature of the event, had reduced the entry list, as the racing manufacturers concentrated on road racing. Freddie Dixon and Charlie Martin won the race in their 2-litre Riley, the Napier-Railton conspicuously absent as it was setting speed records in Utah. Only 18 cars started, of which only six were running at the end, and the winning car was only the fourth fastest over the distance; handicap runner-up Bill Pacey and C. T. Baker-Carr in the former's Pacey-Hassan Bentley Special, were over 5mph quicker.

To restore some interest, in 1937 the race was reduced in distance from 500 miles to 500 kilometres, and the winning speed of over 127mph made the race the fastest ever run. The race however had not been a success, and one of the best women racers of the era, Kay Petre, was nearly killed in practice, when her Austin 7 was hit broadside by Reg Parnell's MG Magnette. The race would not be held again, the B.R.D.C. announcing in September 1938 that instead of a 500 mile (or kilometre) race, it was going to run a 204 mile race over the Brooklands road circuit, and a supporting race on the outer circuit of a mere 50 miles.

== Winners ==
Year	Start	Finish	Winner	Car	Speed	Speed ranking	Overall fastest where different	Overall fastest car where different	Speed	Reference
1929	20	9	Jack Barclay; Frank Clement	Bentley	107.32 mph	2nd	Sammy Davis; Clive Dunfee	Bentley	109.4 mph	
1930	35	16	Sammy Davis; Earl of March	Austin	83.41 mph	9th	Dudley Benjafield; Eddie Hall	Bentley	112.12 mph	
1931	40	7	Jack Dunfee; Cyril Paul	Bentley	118.39 mph	1st				
1932	34	11	Ron Horton; Jack Bartlett	MG	96.29 mph	6th	Brian Lewis; John Cobb	Talbot	111.60 mph	
1933	31	7	Eddie Hall	MG	106.53 mph	1st				
1934	32	7	Freddie Dixon	Riley	104.8 mph	1st				
1935	33	5	John Cobb; Tim Rose-Richards	Napier-Railton	121.28 mph	1st				
1936	18	6	Freddie Dixon; Charlie Martin	Riley	110.86 mph	4th	Bill Pacey; Kit Baker-Carr	Pacey-Hassan	115.96 mph	
1937	20	9	John Cobb; Oliver Bertram	Napier-Railton	127.33 mph	1st				
