= Pacey-Hassan =

1930s Bentley-based racing car

Pacey-Hassan Special

Overview
- Production: 1936
- Designer: Walter Hassan

Body and chassis
- Body style: Single-seater
- Layout: FR layout
- Related: Barnato-Hassan

Powertrain
- Engine: 4.5-litre Bentley, later 3l supercharged

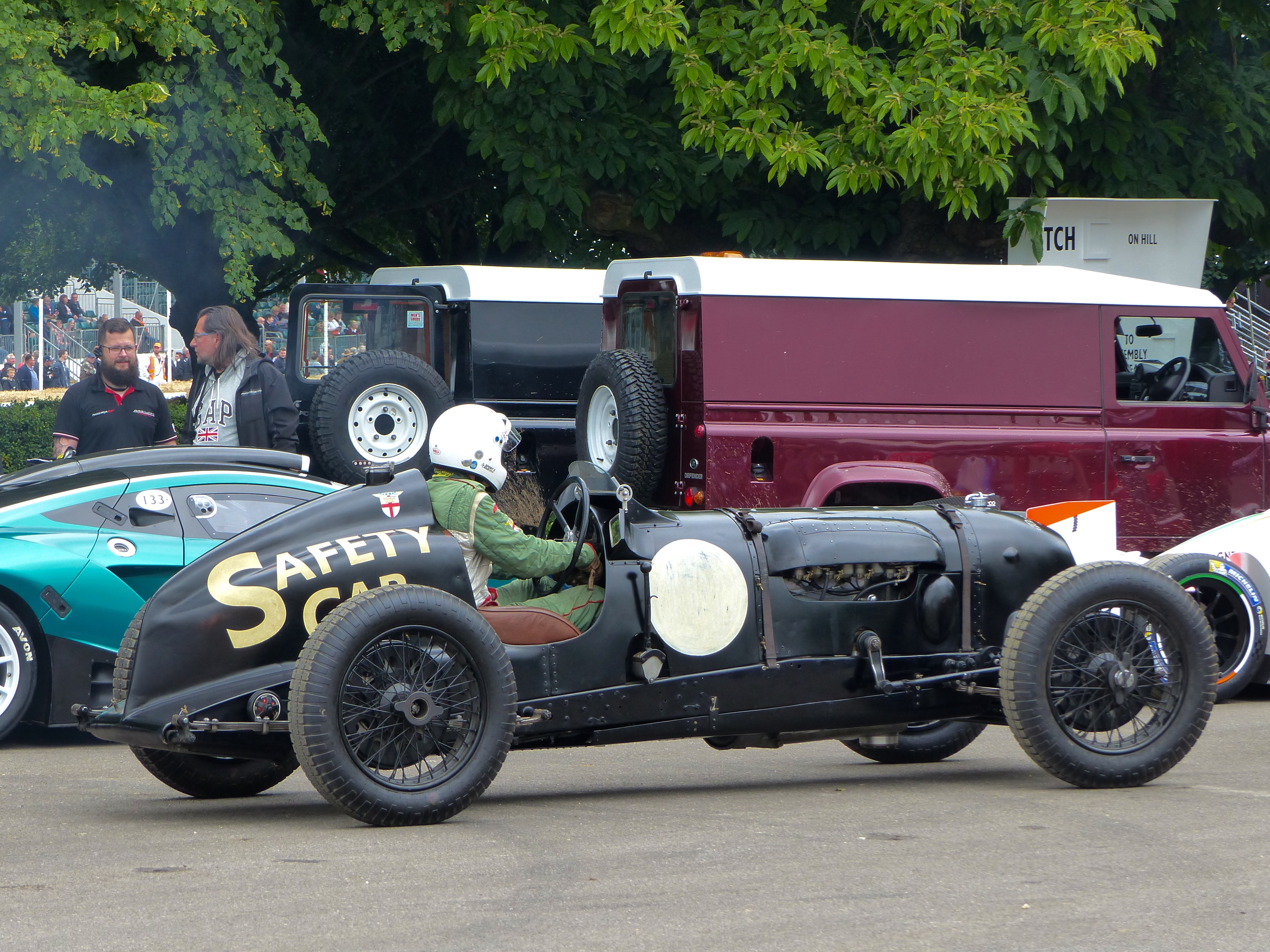
Pacey-Hassan Bentley Special about to clear the hillclimb course at the Goodwood Festival of Speed 2017

The Pacey-Hassan Special was a Bentley-based racing car prepared for racing on the Brooklands concrete oval.

== History ==
In 1936, amateur racer Bill Pacey had been racing a 3-litre Bentley with a 4.5-litre engine shoehorned into it, without any success. Having seen the success of the Barnato-Hassan 8-litre Bentley special, Pacey approached Hassan to see whether he could manage something better; after Woolf Barnato gave Hassan permission to try, Hassan had a single-seater body (made by Thomson & Taylor) fitted, to narrow wind resistance, the resulting car was known as the Pacey-Hassan, and proved startlingly competitive at Brooklands. This was due to the track's handicappers not appreciating that Hassan had made unseen changes to the engine (most Brooklands races were subject to an engine capacity handicap, imitating practice in horse racing to ensure equality between different classes).

Pacey duly recorded his first-ever win at Brooklands in his first race with the car, in the short handicap at the 1936 Easter Meeting, and also won the Star Gold Trophy later in the year, with one lap timed at 128.03mph. The car finished the season with a 2nd place at the International 500 Miles Race, Pacey sharing with experienced Bentley pilot Kit Baker-Carr, and indeed had the fastest overall average speed in the event. Indeed, the Pacey-Hassan may have won without a late stop for fresh plugs. Pacey's success over the season was such that he was awarded a coveted British Racing Drivers Club Gold Star.

In 1937, the handicappers having re-assessed the car, Hassan changed the engine for a 3-litre supercharged version, but the car was nowhere near as successful, and oil leak problems reduced its speed in the shortened International 500 Kilometers race to a lowly 8th. The car was not raced afterwards, Pacey switching to the Bowler-Hoffman Special, but the car survives as an historic model.
