= Ronald Horton =

British racing driver (1907–1996)

R. T. Horton
- Born: Ronald Tombs Horton; 11 September 1907 Tenbury Wells, England
- Died: 16 January 1996 (aged 88) Shrewsbury, England

Ronald Tombs Horton (11 September 1907 – 1996) was a British businessman who had an amateur motor racing career from the early 1920s to 1935, enjoying success at the Brooklands circuit, including winning the International 500 Miles Race in 1932.

== Early life ==
Horton was born into a farming family, but his father died in 1915 and he was orphaned aged 15; he was taken in by his uncle, who lived in Moseley, Birmingham. He was educated at Bowden College, and started working as a stocktaker at Atkinson's Brewery in Aston, working his way up the ranks to become managing director.

He had originally served an apprenticeship with J. Fryer, Ltd. of Hereford, before joining Lea & Francis, until 1925, when his uncle encouraged him to join the family property business. He also ran a garage at Anderton Park Road in Moseley, Birmingham, during the 1930s.

== Racing career ==
Horton started driving while still a teenager in 1920, with a 1913 Morgan converted into a racing car by taking off all extraneous materials, then graduated to a Morgan Aero, and in 1924 a racing three-wheeler which brought him around 60 victories in sand races at Pendine Sands, Skegness and Southport, as well as being part of the three-man Morgan team which won the International Six Day Trial. In 1929 he graduated to road racing, taking part in the Ulster TT in an Amilcar Six he had bought from Vernon Balls. He won the 1,100cc class at the same event in 1930 driving a Riley Nine, painted in his usual racing colour of red.

In 1931, he made his first appearances in an MG - a C-type Midget, run by Major Goldie Gardner, at the Brooklands Double 12 Hour race - and won the 1,100cc class at the Shelsley Walsh hillclimb in a 1,100cc Alta-engined special built by Robin Jackson at Brooklands.

In 1932 Horton contracted with W. J. Smith & Co of West Bromwich to prepare an aerodynamic single-seater body for a Midget he had bought from Gardner; the design and work was done by brothers Richard and Alan Jensen, who would transform the company into Jensen Motors. The result led to a hugely successful 1932 season, earning a B.R.D.C. Gold Star for his victories over the year. His fastest Brooklands lap of over 115mph beating even that of George Eyston.

The highlight of the season was winning the 1932 International 500 Miles race in the Midget, with Jack Bartlett as co-driver, a late burst of speed seeing the streamlined MG take the win at the last; Horton was also a serious threat in the 1933 race, but, while second, a series of "expensive noises" caused him to retire.

Horton's major success in 1933 came at the Avus circuit, winning the 750cc class at the Avusrennen in the C-type, being presented with the £200 prize by Adolf Hühnlein. He also increased his 1,100cc Brooklands lap record to 115.5mph. By this time he also had an MG Magnette, bought from Hugh Hamilton, with which he entered the Ulster TT, but illness prevented him from racing. He did however finish 4th in the British Empire Trophy, one of Brooklands' rare scratch races, with cars of three times the capacity finishing first and second; Horton lost third late on because of a misfire, being pipped by Jock Manby-Colegrave by under two seconds.

1934 saw him set several class world records at Brooklands, for covering distances between 50 kilometres and 200 kilometres at between 114 and 118mph. He also finished 7th at the Mannin Beg on the Isle of Man (in the Magnette), suffering from water-pump issues, plus won the Light Car Challenge Cup.

=== End of career ===
At the start of 1935, Horton bought a Maserati from Whitney Straight, with the intent of stepping up in class, but a promotion at Atkinson's Brewery, plus having a young family, meant that he had to choose between business and sport, and he chose business. He later explored interests in fishing and farming, buying a steading in Herefordshire.

== Personal life ==
Horton was married to Winifred and had one son and daughter, who survived him. Between 1977 and 1984, he was chairman of the family property firm, Hortons Estates, which owned the Grand and Midland Hotels in Birmingham; he also became chairman of Atkinson's Brewery before it was taken over by Mitchells & Butlers in 1959, although he remained on the board until 1968. After the death of Winifred in 1995, he moved to Shrewsbury, to be close to his daughter, and died in January 1996.

== Use of name ==
Contemporary motor racing media tended to refer to him as R. T. Horton, in accordance with the usual practice of the time, of referring to drivers by their initials; later publications usually referred to him as Ronald (if dealing with his business matters), or Ron/Ronnie Horton (if referring to his racing).
