= Cecil Kimber =

British automobile designer

- Born: 12 April 1888; Dulwich, Southwark, London, England
- Died: 4 February 1945 (aged 56); King's Cross railway station, London, England
- Spouses: (1) Irene Hunt; (2) Muriel Dewar
- Children: Lisa, Jean (by 1)
- Parent(s): Henry Frances and Fanny (née Newhouse) Kimber
- Engineering career
- Discipline: Automobile
- Institutions: Institute of Mechanical Engineers
- Employer: Morris Garages/The M.G. Car Company

Cecil Kimber (12 April 1888 – 4 February 1945) was a self-taught British businessman, engineer, inventor, race-car driver and the creative motor-car designer best known for having been the driving force behind The M.G. Car Company. Kimber's automotive design philosophy was simple: "A sports car should look fast even when it is standing still".

Kimber was a pioneer of affordable sporting automobiles, starting in the 1920s. Kimber's MG M-type (the first MG "Midget") became the world's best-selling sports car in 1932. His concept of the quick, nimble "open sports car" automobile continues throughout the world.

== Early life ==
Kimber was born in Dulwich, Southwark, London on 12 April 1888 to printer's ink manufacturer Henry Frances and his wife Fanny (née Newhouse) Kimber.

In 1898, Kimber attended Stockport Grammar School for more than five years. His interests included photography and sailing. He joined his father's company and took an early interest in motorcycles, buying a 1906 Rex model. After buying the motorcycle, he immediately took the motorcycle apart and reassembled it. Kimber started repairing motorized bicycles and motorcycles at the age of 18.

=== Motorcycle accident and family rift ===
Kimber was struck by a car during a motorcycle ride. One of his legs was shattered, nearly amputated and shorter than the other after healing from multiple surgeries. Kimber received a substantial insurance award. Kimber's father asked him to give the money to the struggling family business. Kimber refused as he felt the payment for his injury was solely his. In 1914 he left his father's business and struck out on his own.

== Automotive career ==
Now unable to safely ride a motorcycle, Kimber became a motorcar racing enthusiast. Kimber bought a 10 hp Singer in 1913. This interest caused him to leave the family firm in 1914 and get a job with Sheffield-Simplex as assistant to the chief designer. During World War I he moved first to AC Cars and then joined component supplier EG Wrigley. He made a large personal investment in Wrigley and while there, styled the radiator for the Angus-Sanderson line of cars. Those cars did not sell well, Kimber lost his investment and left Wrigley.

=== Morris Garages ===
In 1921 Kimber was hired as sales manager with Morris Garages, a private company founded in 1909 by William Richard Morris. Primarily an automobile dealership, the business also specialized in customizing cars to order. By 1923, Kimber was named general manager.

While at Morris Garages he developed a range of special bodies for Morris Oxford cars with coachwork of his own design. These cars were sold under the MG brand. In 1924 his modified, higher-performance 14/28 Oxford "Bullnose" was advertised as one of the "Morris Garages Super Sports" and as "our popular M.G. Saloon". Kimber then began producing four passenger Oxford variants with larger motors.

=== Founded the MG brand using speed and racing ===
Kimber felt success in auto racing was the key to building both awareness and demand that would make his cars desired around the world. To that end, he commenced building customized, lighter-bodied racing versions of his automobiles and entering them in contests.

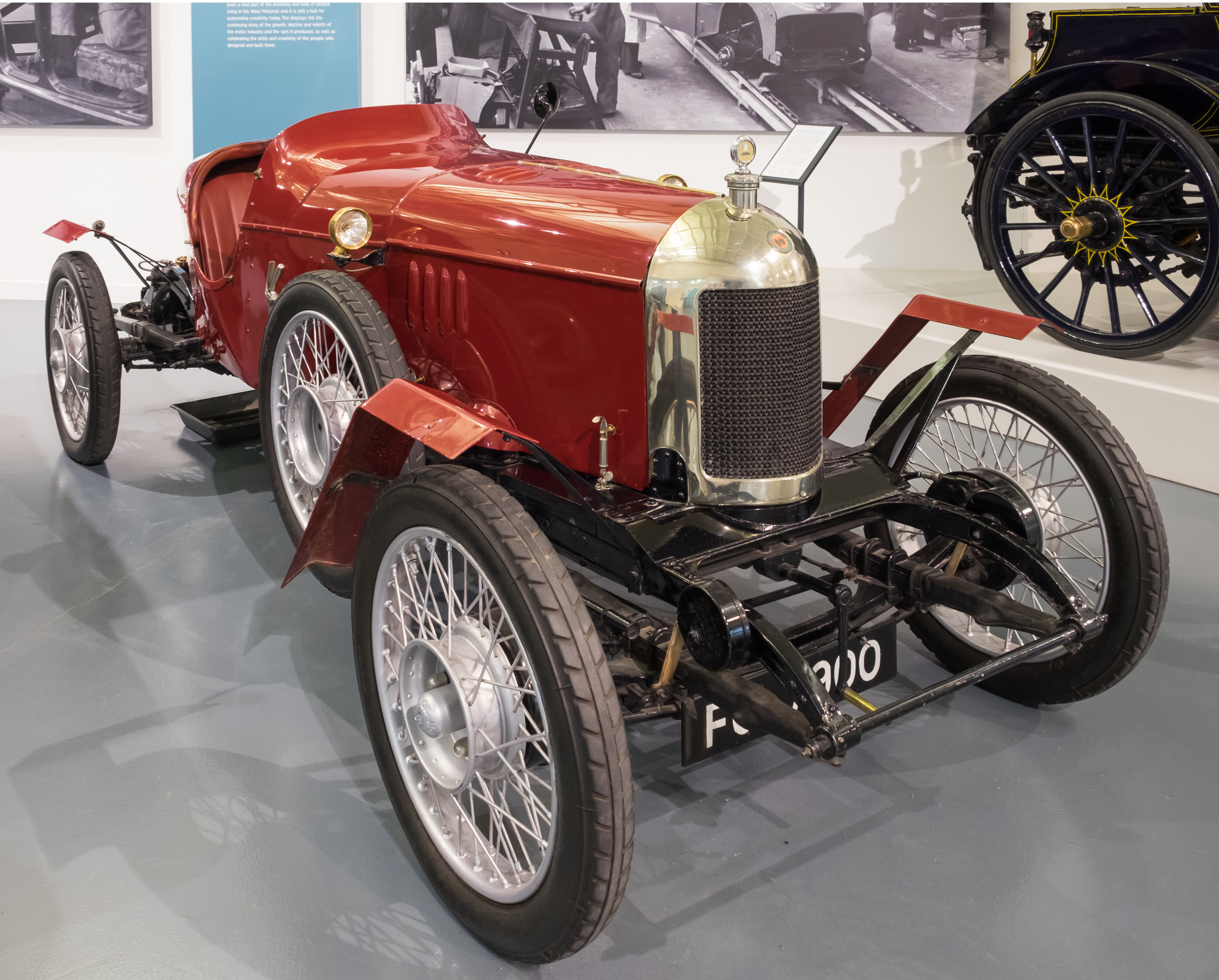
The one-off special built in 1925 for Cecil Kimber and known as the MG 'Old Number One'

In March 1925, Kimber won the 300 mile "London-to-Land's End Reliability Trial" while driving Morris Garage's "Old Number One". It was the manufacturer's first major racing win. Kimber was awarded a gold medal for his first place finish.

In 1925 a letter Kimber issued "To All Motor Traders:" said "In order to remove any doubt from the minds of British Motor Traders, we repeat that M.G. Sports Cars are not 'hotted up' or sports editions of any standard car, but are designed and built in every detail as Sports Cars and represent the entire output of the factory".

== The M.G. Car Company philosophy ==
The M.G. Car Company was founded in 1928, specialising in the production of MG sports cars. The new company moved from Oxford to Abingdon in 1929 and Kimber became managing director in July 1930.

Kimber effusively praised an early Alfa Romeo as an automobile that spurred him to create a better M.G., saying "One of the finest sports cars I had ever driven was a two-seater 1 1/2-litre Alfa-Romeo, supercharged. This was in 1928 or ’29, and whilst to some the springing might have been on the hard side, for sheer pleasure of driving, perfect controllability, brakes and steering, it was the most wonderful thing I had ever handled to that time... It was in the early days of my efforts to produce a sports car worthy of the name, and I must confess that that experience spurred me on in a way nothing else could have done". The difference that Kimber brought to the design and production of sporting automobiles is that his cars could be purchased at an affordable price point.

=== 750cc "Baby Car" competition ===
Wanting to best Austin and other competitors in the 750cc "Baby car" auto class, Kimber managed the development of the MG C-type, the EX120. Captain George Eyston helped develop and drove the EX120s whose engines were modified with Eyston's Powerplus supercharger. Five of the fourteen EX-120s entered in the 1931 Brooklands Double Twelve event won first place.

=== Land speed records ===
Kimber pushed to best Austin by reaching 100 mph in the 750cc category. Kimber succeeded. An EX120 driven by Eyston reached 103.13 mph on the Autodrome de Linas-Montlhéry track in 1931.

In 1932 Eyston set a new land speed record of 119.48 mph at Pendine Sands, Carmarthen Bay, Wales in the 750cc M.G. "Magic Midget"

=== 1100cc land speed records ===
Kimber oversaw the development of a MG K-type K-3 Magnette into the 1100cc EX135. The car won many first place awards, including speed trials, trophy races, hill climbs and the 1933 Mille Miglia. Kimber said "We have learned a great deal from our racing experience in 1933 and the (next) cars will be distinctly faster".

An 1100cc MG K3 Magnette and a 750cc MG PA Midget both placed in the Index of Performance during the 1934 24 Hours of Le Mans. In 1939 the 1100cc car achieved a record 204.3 mph for the mile at the Dessau racetrack.

Tazio Nuvolari drove a supercharged MG K3 Magnette an average speed of 78.65 mph, winning the near six-kour, 478 mile in the 1933 RAC Tourist Trophy in Ulster. The record set by the MG stood for 18 years.

=== M.G. Car Company sold ===
The main shareholder remained William Morris. In 1935 Morris formally sold M.G. to Morris Motors which meant Kimber was no longer in sole control and had to take instructions from head office leading to him becoming increasingly disillusioned with his role.

With the outbreak of World War II, car production stopped and at first M.G. was reduced to making basic items for the armed forces until Kimber obtained contract work on aircraft but this was done without first obtaining approval and he was asked to resign and left in 1941.

== Later career ==
Kimber's later career included working in 1941 at Coventry coachbuilder Charlesworth and a year later he served as Director of piston manufacturer Specialloid.

== Accidental death and cremation ==
Kimber was killed in the King's Cross railway accident on 4 February 1945, having boarded the 6:00 p.m. Leeds and Bradford express. Shortly after leaving the station and entering Gasworks Tunnel, the locomotive's wheels started slipping on a newly replaced section of rail laid on the rising gradient. In the darkness, the driver failed to realise that the train was no longer moving forward and had started to roll back at a speed of some 6–7 mph (9.7–11.3 km/h). The signalman noticed this and attempted to avert a collision with another train in the station by switching the points to an empty platform but was too late. The rear carriage was derailed, rolled onto its side and was crushed against the steel support of the main signal gantry. The first-class compartment where Kimber had been sitting was demolished; he and one other passenger were killed.

Kimber was taken to University College Hospital London where he was pronounced dead. Kimber's body was cremated at North London's Golders Green Crematorium. His ashes were scattered in Chichester Harbour.

His daughter said of his dying "His death was nobody's fault but MG had been his be-all and end-all. It was a merciful release. He never quite got over being fired".

== Family ==
Cecil Kimber married twice, first to Irene (Rene) Hunt with whom he had two daughters, Lisa and Jean, and after Irene died in 1938 to Muriel Dewar. He was elected as President of the Automobile Division of the Institution of Mechanical Engineers.

== Honors ==
- 2019 - "Kimber Wing", New College, Oxford - A highly specified, fully accessible suite for two disabled students named for Kimber
- 2017 - British Sportscar Hall of Fame Inductee
- 2014 - Oxfordshire Blue Plaque, The Boundary House, Abingdon
