= Jack Dunfee =

Jack Lawson Dunfee (26 October 1901 – 13 September 1975) was a British motor racing driver, theatrical impresario, and later farmer who was one of the "Bentley Boys" at Brooklands before the Second World War.

== Motor racing ==
Dunfee was one of four sons of Colonel Vickers Dunfee, and the older brother of Clive Dunfee. Dunfee came 2nd in the 1929 Le Mans 24 Hours with Glen Kidston, winning the 5 litre class, and won the 1931 Brooklands International 500 Miles Race with Cyril Paul in the "Old Number One" Bentley Speed Six.

In the same race in 1932, the Dunfee brothers shared "Old Number One", with a brand new 8-litre engine installed. After the first driving stint Jack Dunfee was in fourth place when he entered the pits. Clive took over, and shortly after, in passing Earl Howe's Bugatti, he went too high up the banking, putting the wheel of his car over the lip. The car cartwheeled over the top, hit a large tree and plunged down through the trees to the road below. Clive was thrown out and killed instantly.

== Marriage ==
In 1939 Jack Dunfee married actress and dancer Sandra Storme, but the marriage ended in divorce.

In 1953 he married model Audrey White, but that marriage also ended in divorce.
