= Clive Dunfee =

British racing driver

Clive Dunfee

Beresford Clive Dunfee (18 June 1904 – 24 September 1932) was a British racing driver, one of the "Bentley Boys" of the 1930s, who was killed in a dramatic accident at Brooklands.

Dunfee was the third of four sons of Colonel Vickers Dunfee and the younger brother of Jack Dunfee, also a motor racer. He took part in the 1930 24 Hours of Le Mans and in the same year married the actress Jane Baxter one of the leading ladies of the British cinema in the Thirties.

In 1932 the Dunfee brothers raced the BRDC 500 Miles Race at Brooklands, in the "Old Number One" Bentley Speed Six, with a brand new 8-litre engine installed. After the first driving stint Jack Dunfee was in fourth place when he entered the pits. Clive took over, and shortly after, in passing Earl Howe's Bugatti, he went too high up the banking, putting the wheel of his car over the lip. The car cartwheeled over the top, hit a large tree and plunged down through the trees to the road below. Dunfee was thrown out and killed instantly. His wife was watching the race when he crashed to his death.
