= Bentley Speed Six =

Bentley 6½ Litre & Speed Six
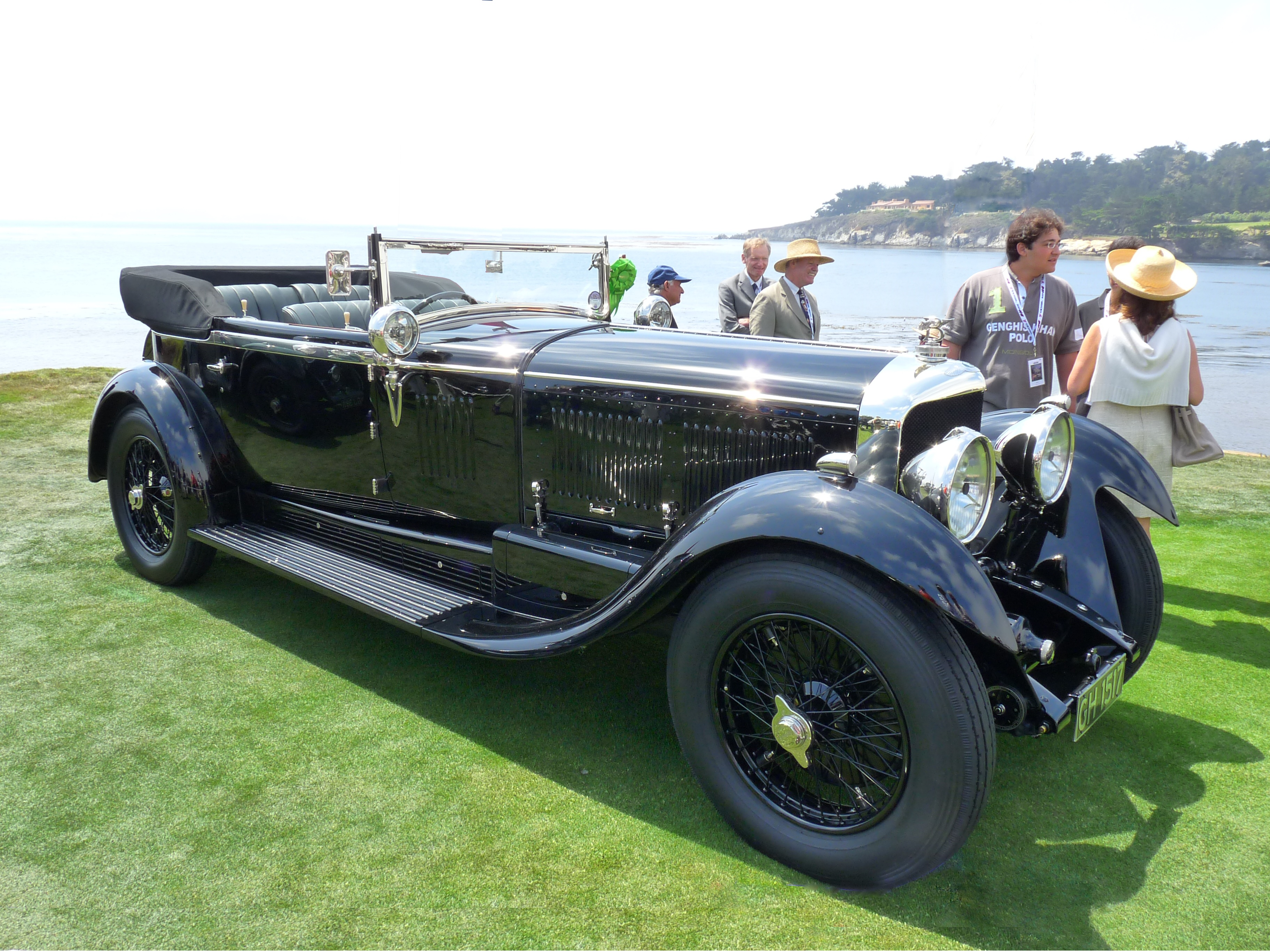
- Speed Six Mulliner drophead coupé 1930

Overview
- Manufacturer: Bentley Motors Limited
- Production: 1926–1930; 544 produced
- Assembly: United Kingdom: Cricklewood
- Designer: Walter Owen Bentley

Body and chassis
- Class: rolling chassis
- Body style: as arranged with coachbuilder by customer
- Layout: FR layout

Powertrain
- Engine: 6.5 L I6

Dimensions
- Wheelbase: 132 in (3,353 mm); 138 in (3,505 mm); 140.5 in (3,569 mm); 144 in (3,658 mm); 145.5 in (3,696 mm); 150 in (3,810 mm); 151.5 in (3,848 mm); 152.5 in (3,874 mm)

Chronology
- Successor: Bentley 8 Litre

The Bentley Speed Six was a high-performance luxury automobile introduced in 1928 by Bentley Motors as a more sporting version of the Bentley 6½ Litre in production since 1926. Offered like the 6½ Litre as a rolling chassis, the Speed Six became the most successful racing Bentley.

Two Bentley Speed Sixes chassis became known as the Blue Train Bentleys after their owner Woolf Barnato "raced" the French Train Bleu in March 1930. The express departed Cannes at 17:45 and, after a stop in Paris, was scheduled to arrive in Calais at 15:24 when Barnato already was in his club in London.

== Background ==
By 1924 Bentley had been in business for five years. He decided to build a larger chassis than the 3 Litre, with a smoother, more powerful, engine. The new chassis would be more suitable for the large and heavy limousine bodies that many of his customers were then putting on his sports car chassis. The resulting car would be more refined and better suited for comfortable general motoring.

== Prototype race ==
Bentley built a development mule with a 4¼-litre straight-six engine derived from the 3 Litre's four-cylinder engine. To disguise the car's origin, it had a large, wedge-shaped radiator and was registered as a "Sun". The chassis was given a large very lightweight Weymann-type tourer body built by Freestone and Webb.

W. O. Bentley combined one of his road tests of the "Sun" with a trip to see the 1924 French Grand Prix in Lyon. On his return trip to the ferry at Dieppe, W. O. encountered another disguised car at a three-way junction. W. O. and the Rolls-Royce test driver recognized each other and began racing each other along the routes nationales. This street race continued until the Rolls-Royce driver's hat blew off and he had to stop to retrieve it. The Sun's tyres were heavily worn when W.O. got to the ferry at Dieppe.

== 6½ Litre ==
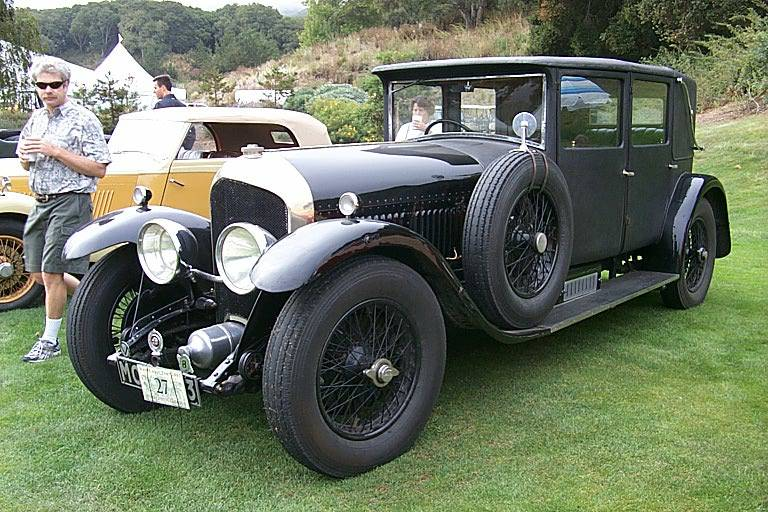
1927 Bentley 6½ Litre, with H. J. Mulliner & Co. limousine body

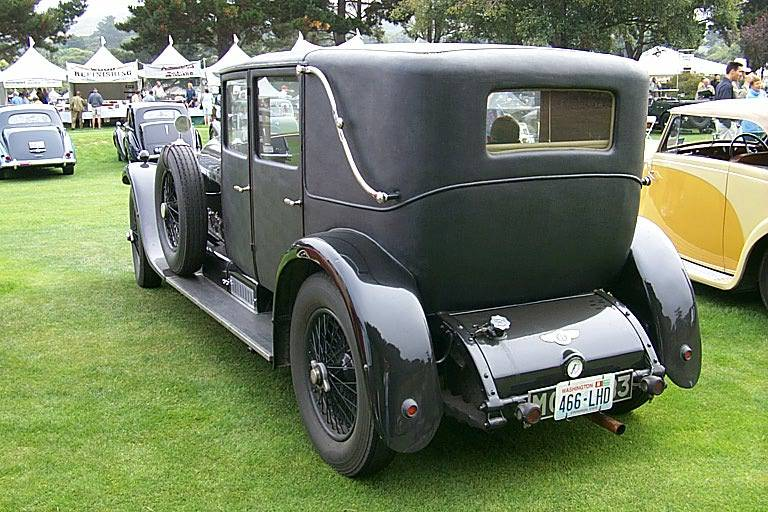
Rear view

Realizing from the impromptu race that the Sun had no performance advantage over Rolls-Royce's latest development, W. O. increased the bore of his six-cylinder engine from 80 millimetres (3.1 in) to 100 millimetres (3.9 in). With a 140 mm (5.5 in) stroke, the engine had a displacement of 6.6 L (6,597 cc (402.6 cu in)) Like the four-cylinder engine, Bentley's six included an overhead camshaft, 4 valves per cylinder, and a single-piece engine block and cylinder head cast in iron, which eliminated a cylinder block to head joint/interface and hence the need for a head gasket. Unlike the earlier 3 Litre Bentley, the 6 1/2 engine used a novel form of overhead camshaft drive which featured a Bentley patented "three-throw drive" system of triple coupling rods which connected 120 degree phased 3 throw eccentrics on both crank shaft and camshaft. This mechanism was completely successful and was later carried over the 8 litre models. In base form, with a single Smiths 5-jet carburettor, twin ignition magnetos, and a compression ratio of 4.4:1, the Bentley 6½ Litre delivered 147 horsepower (110 kW) at 3500 RPM.

Although based on the 3 Litre's engine, the 6½ engine incorporated many improvements. The 3 Litre's cone-type clutch was replaced by a dry-plate design that incorporated a clutch brake for fast gear changes, and the car had power-assisted four-wheel brakes with finned drums. The front brakes had 4 leading shoes per drum. By operating a patented compensating device, the driver could adjust all four brakes to correct for wear while the car was moving, which was particularly advantageous during races.

A variety of wheelbases were provided ranging from 132 to 152.5 in (3,353 to 3,874 mm); the most popular was 150 inches.

== Speed Six ==
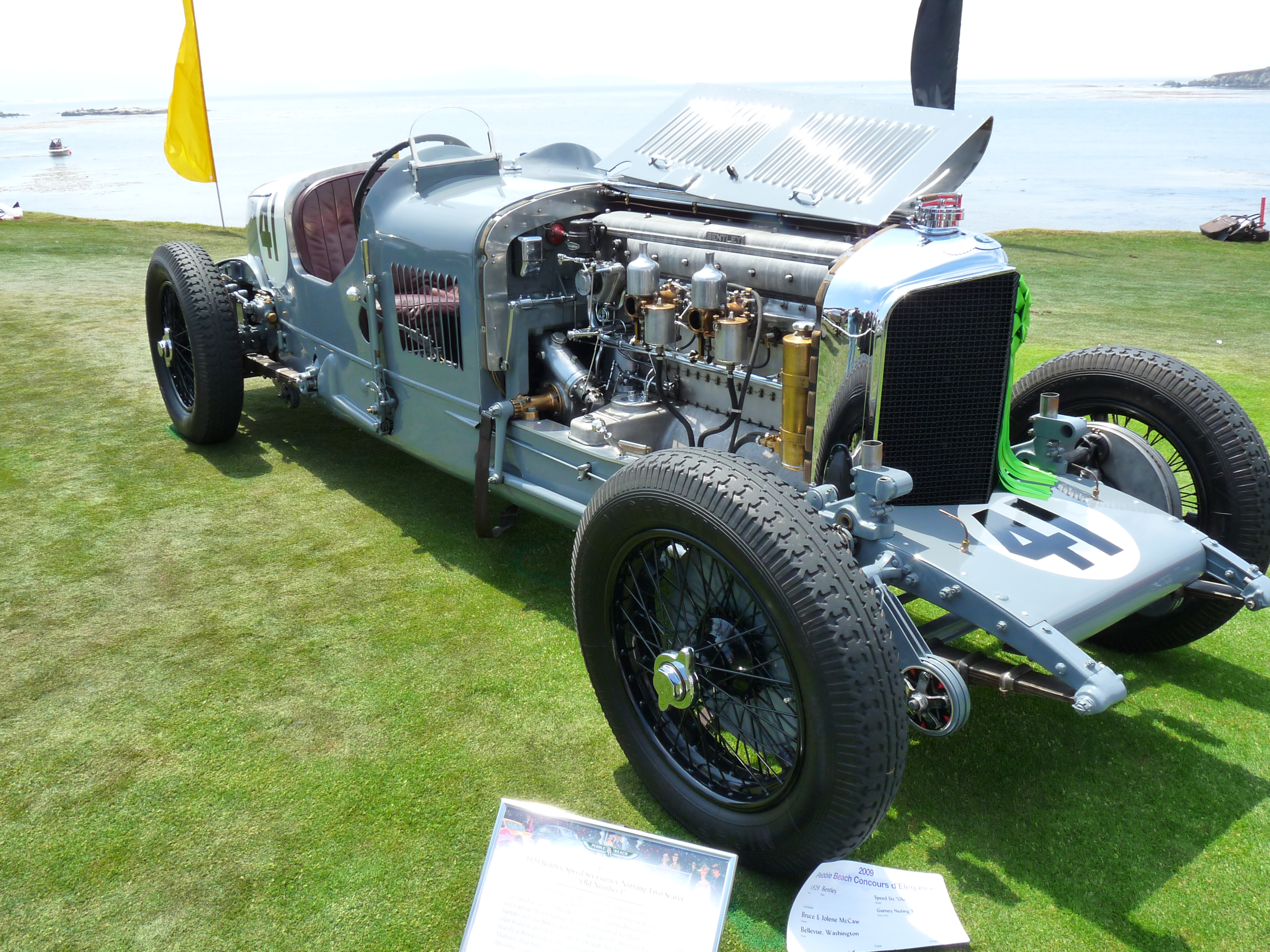
Old Number One, winner of the 24 Hours of Le Mans in 1929 and 1930

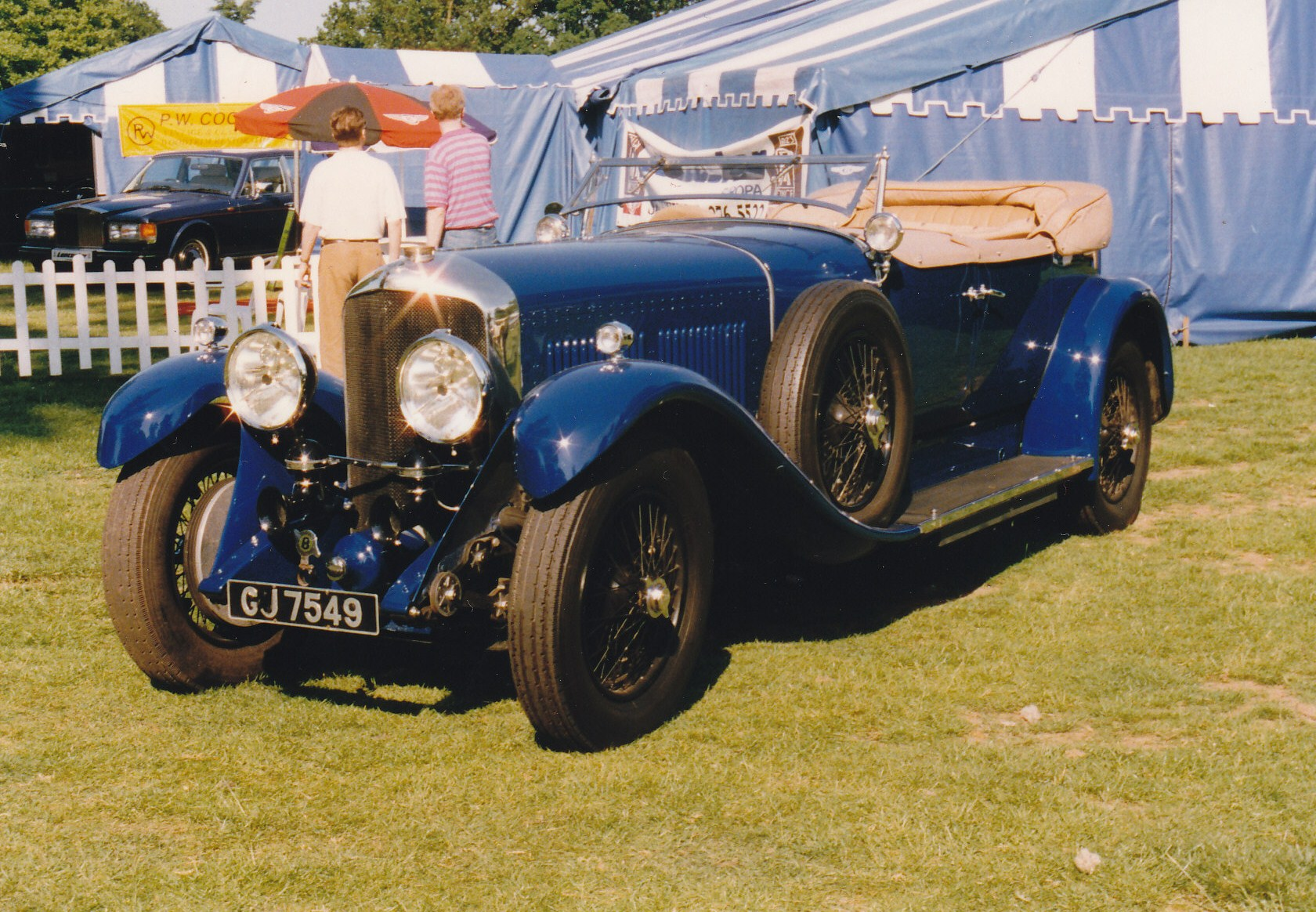
Speed Six tourer with original body by coachbuilder Hooper

The Bentley Speed Six chassis was introduced in 1928 as a more sporting version of the Bentley 6½ Litre. With a single-port block, two SU carburettors, a high-performance camshaft, and a compression ratio of 5.3:1, the Speed Six's engine produced 180 hp (130 kW) at 3500 rpm. The Speed Six chassis was available to customers with wheelbases of 138 inches (3,505 mm), 140.5 inches (3,569 mm), and 152.5 inches (3,874 mm). The 138 inch wheelbase was the most popular.

The Criminal Investigation Department of the Western Australia Police operated two saloon-bodied examples as patrol cars.

In March 1930, Barnato raced against the Blue Train in a Speed Six with H. J. Mulliner saloon coachwork, reaching his club in London before the train was due in the station at Calais. It had generally been believed that the car in the race was a Gurney Nutting Sportsman Coupé, but that car was delivered to Barnato in May 1930, more than a month after the race.

=== Factory racing cars ===
The racing version of the Speed Six had a wheelbase of 11 feet (132 in; 3,353 mm) and an engine with a compression ratio of 6.1:1 that produced 200 hp (150 kW) at 3500 rpm. Successful in racing, these cars won the 24 Hours of Le Mans in 1929 and 1930 with Bentley Boys drivers "Tim" Birkin, Glen Kidston, and Woolf Barnato, the chairman of Bentley Motors.

== Production ==
- 6½ Litre: 362
- Speed Six: 182

== Gallery ==
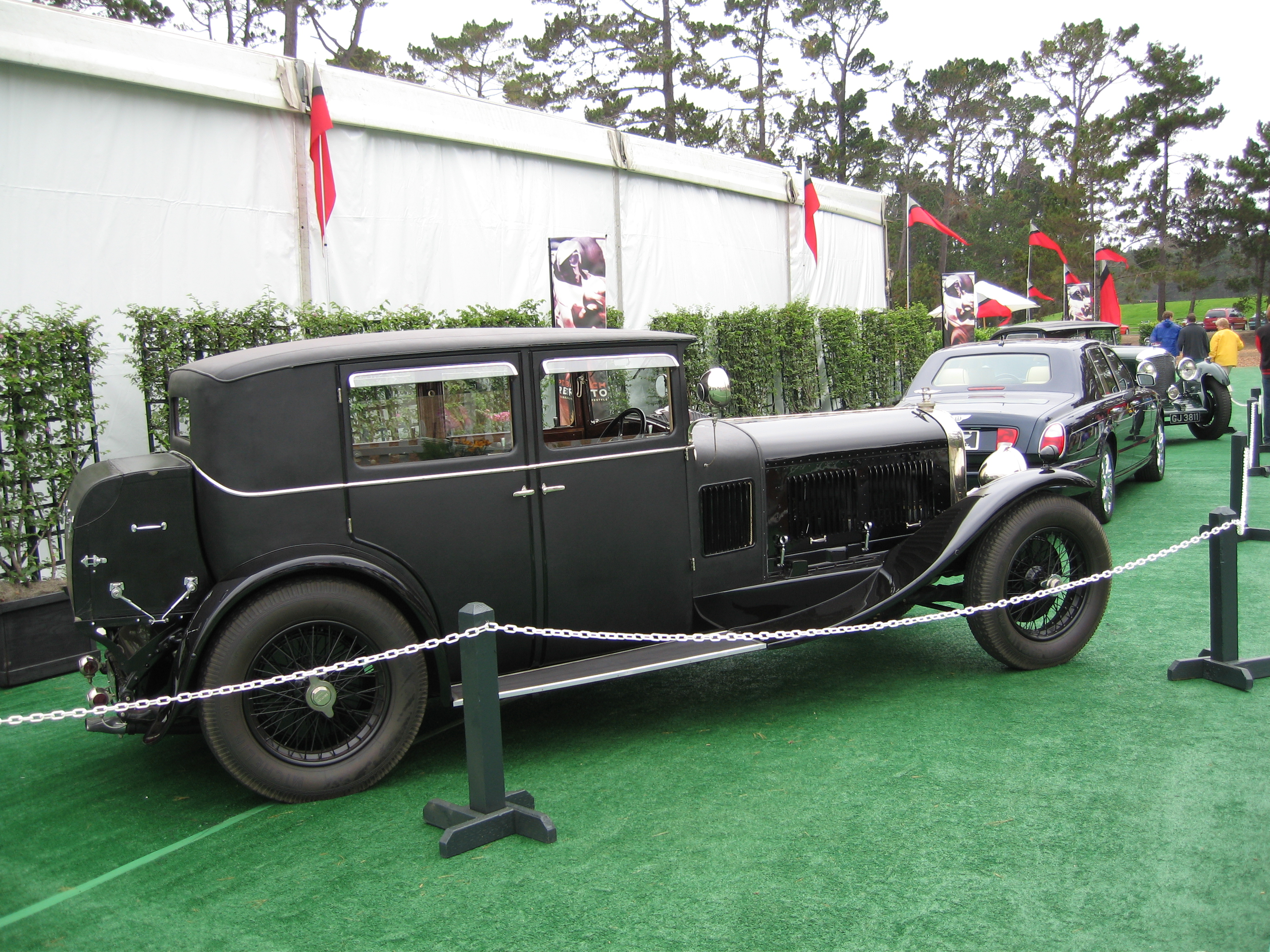
Woolf Barnato's Speed Six H. J. Mulliner saloon, in which he raced against the Blue Train

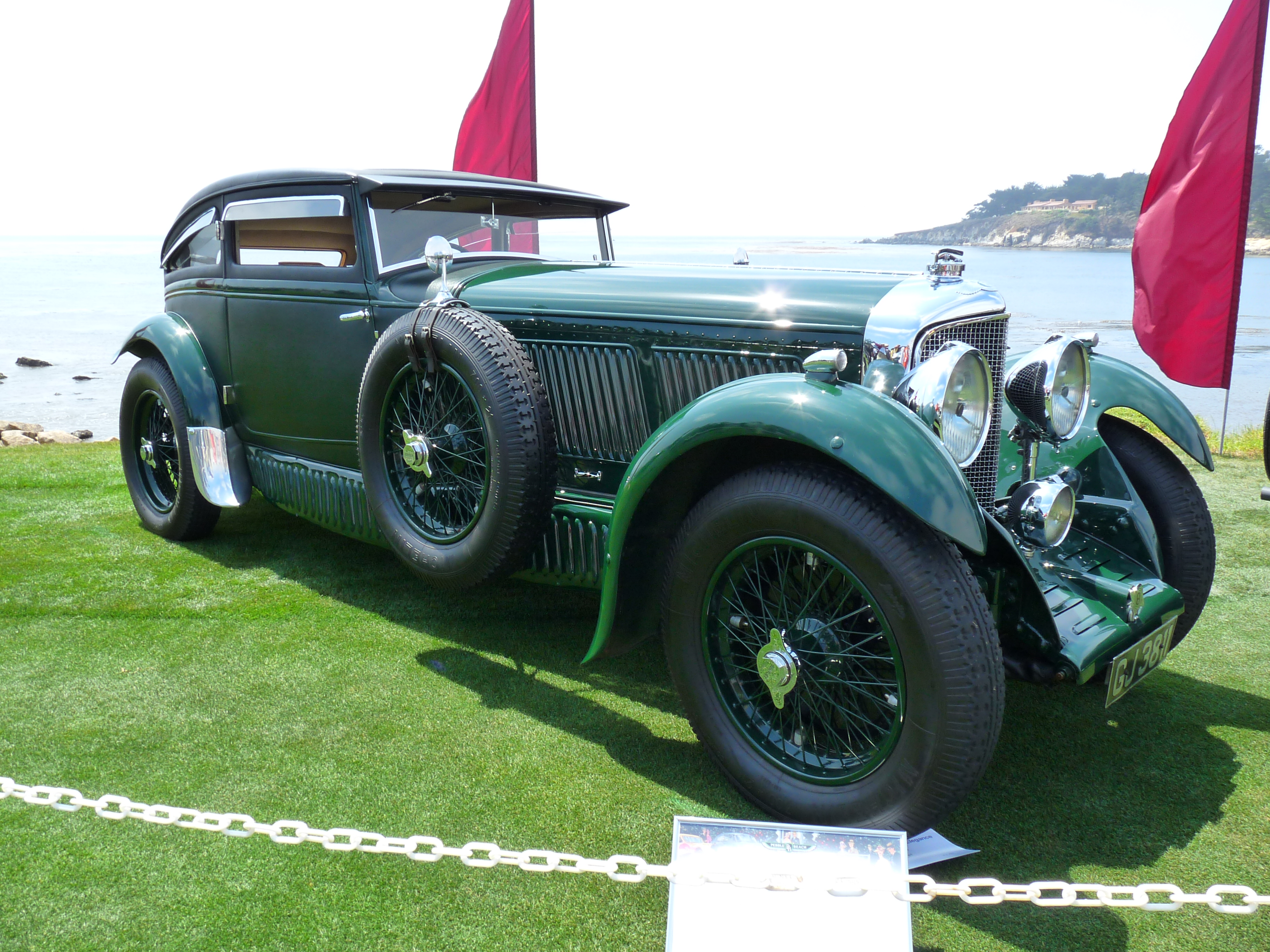
1930 Gurney Nutting Sportsman Coupé, often believed to be the car that raced the Blue Train, was in fact delivered to Barnato weeks after the race. (2009).

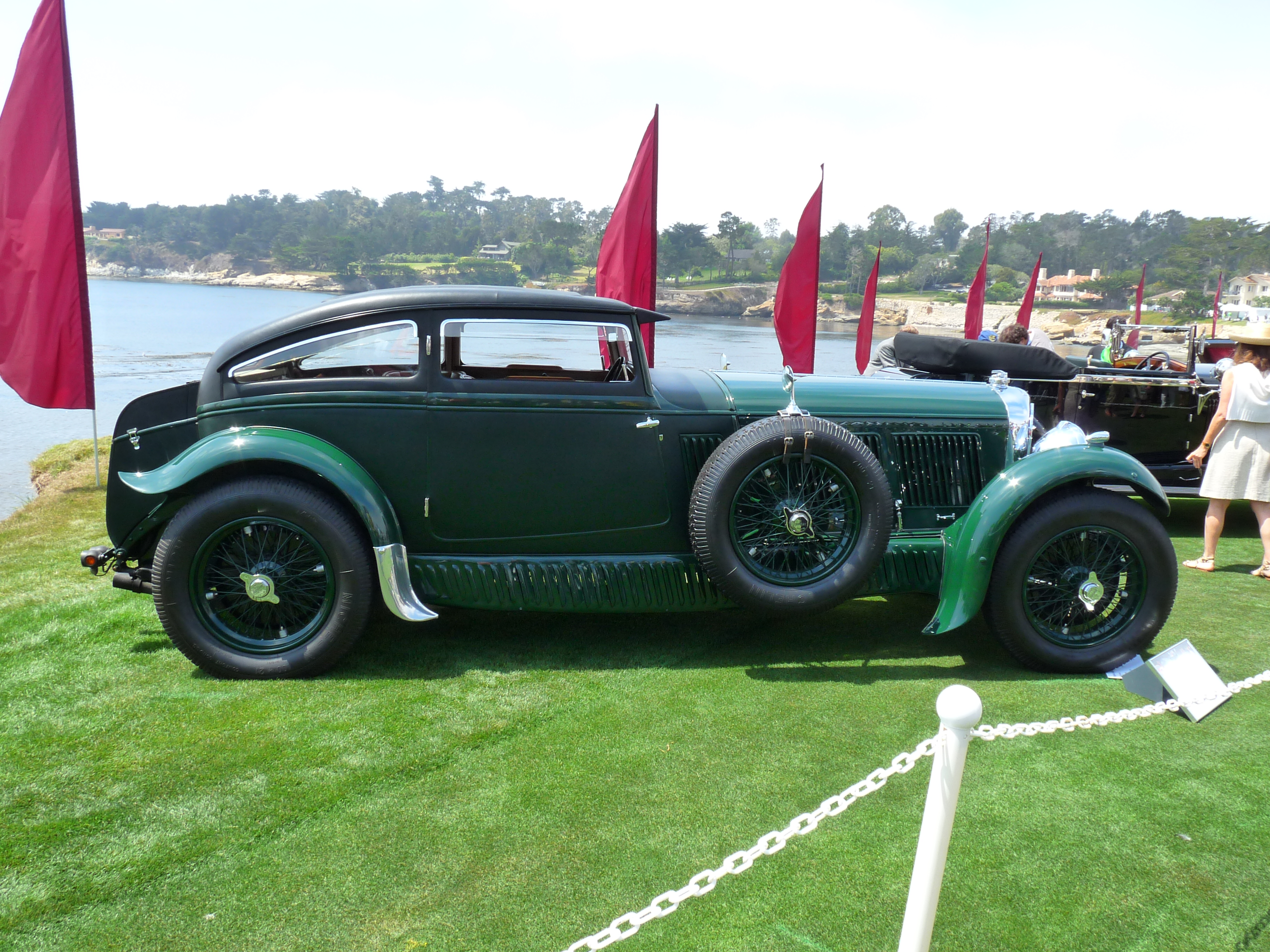
Side view

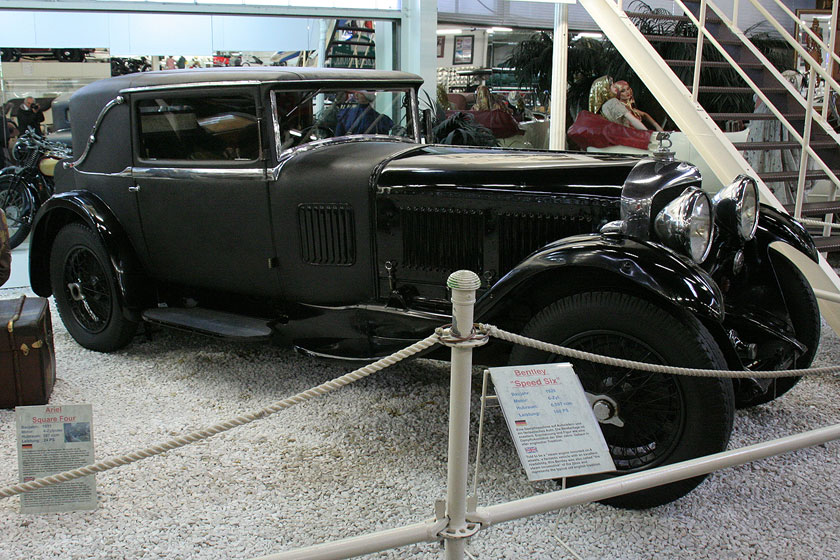
Bentley Speed Six drophead coupé

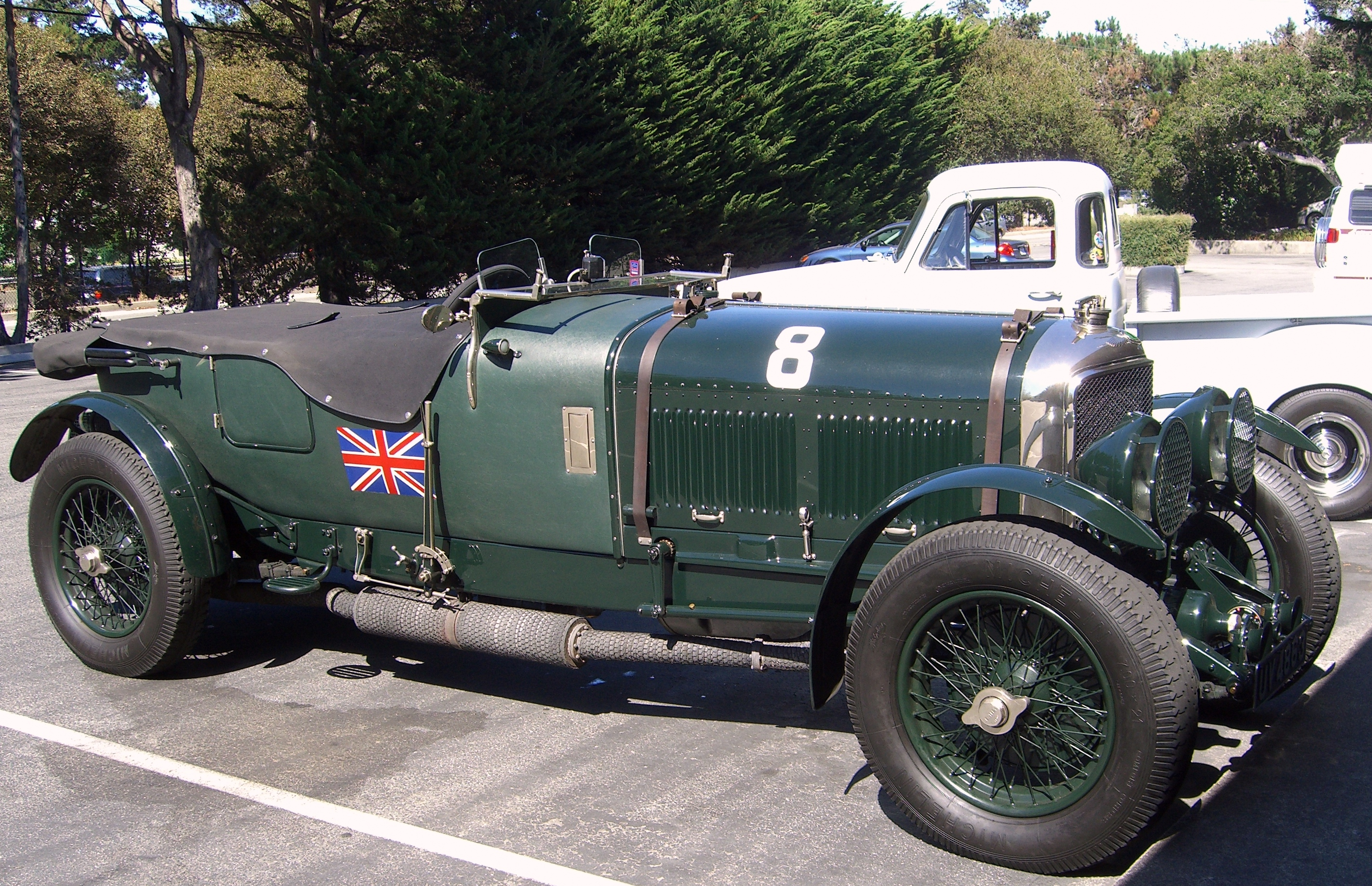
Bentley Speed Six prepared for racing

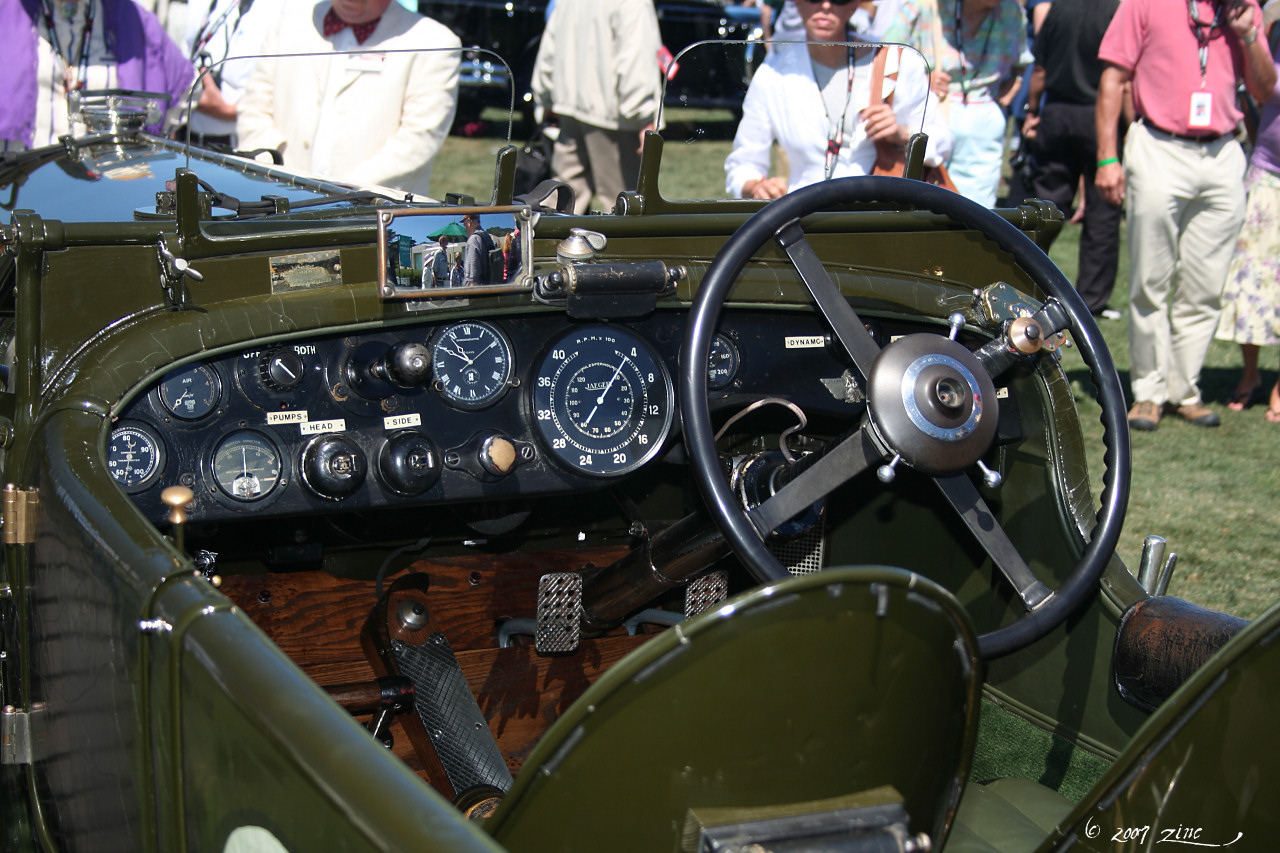
Bentley Speed Six interior
