= Bentley 4 Litre =

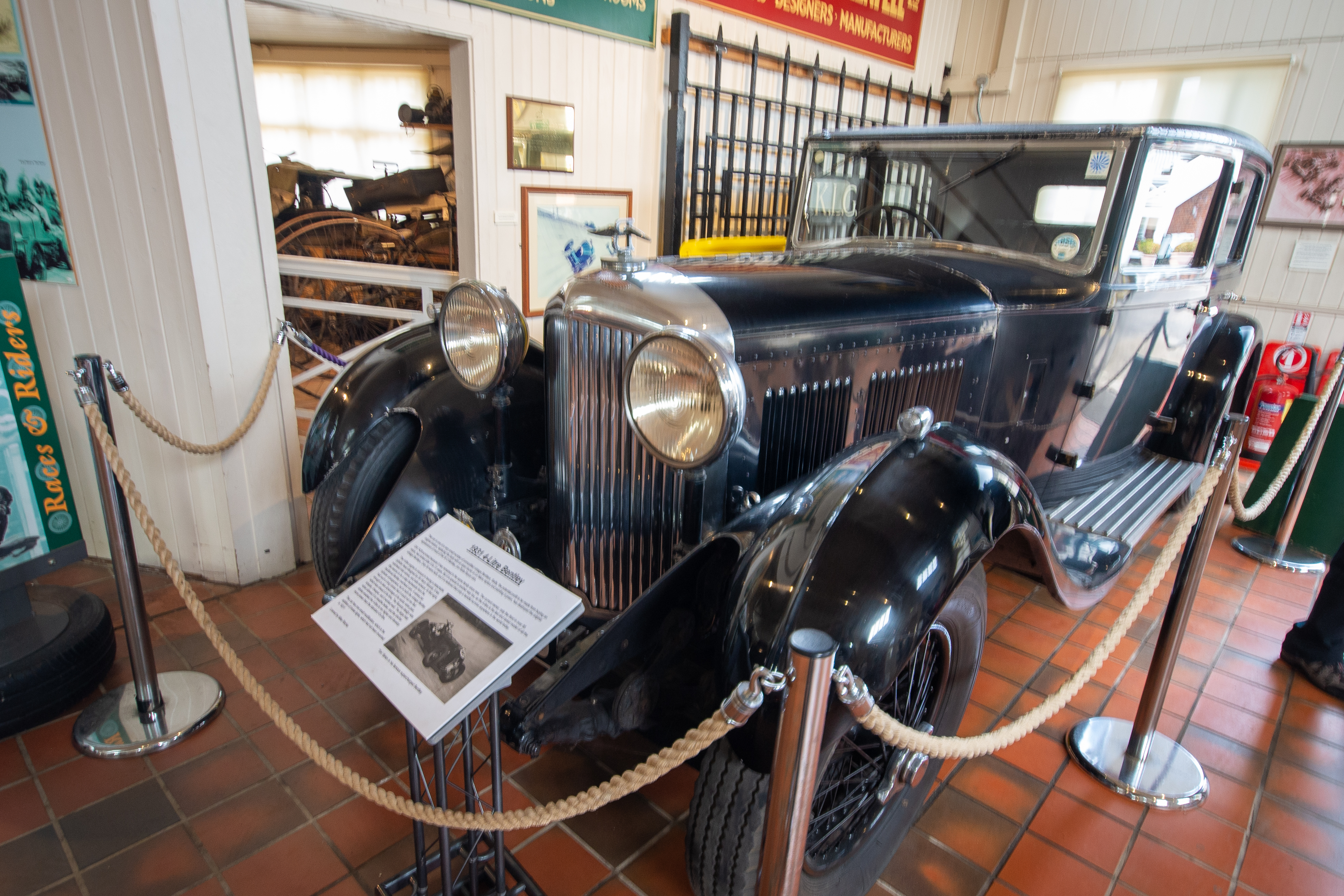
- Brooklands Motor Museum, Weybridge, Surrey

Overview
- Manufacturer: Bentley Motors Limited
- Production: 1931; 50 produced
- Assembly: United Kingdom: Cricklewood
- Designer: Walter Owen Bentley; Harry Ricardo

Body and chassis
- Class: Luxury car
- Body style: As arranged with coachbuilder by customer
- Layout: Front-engine, rear-wheel-drive

Powertrain
- Engine: 3.9 L Ricardo IOE I6

Dimensions
- Wheelbase: 134 in (3,400 mm); 140 in (3,600 mm)

Chronology
- Predecessor: Bentley Speed Six
- Successor: Bentley 3.5 Litre

The Bentley 4 Litre was a motor car built on rolling chassis made by Bentley Motors Limited in 1931. The 4-litre chassis was conceived and built in a failed attempt to restore Bentley to a good financial state. Announced 15 May 1931, it used a modified 4-litre Ricardo IOE engine in a shortened 8 Litre chassis at two-thirds of the price of the 8 Litre in an attempt to compete with the Rolls-Royce 20/25. Instead, Bentley went into receivership shortly afterward, from which it was purchased by Rolls-Royce Limited.

The conventional straight-6 engine used an 85 mm (3.3 in) bore and a 115 mm (4.5 in) stroke for a total displacement of 3.9 L (3,900 cc; 240 cu in) and a power output of 120 bhp (89 kW) at 4,000 rpm. The engine power was not suitable for the heavy chassis.
