= Bentley 6½ Liter =

Luxury sports car produced by Bentley from 1926 to 1930

Bentley 6½ Litre
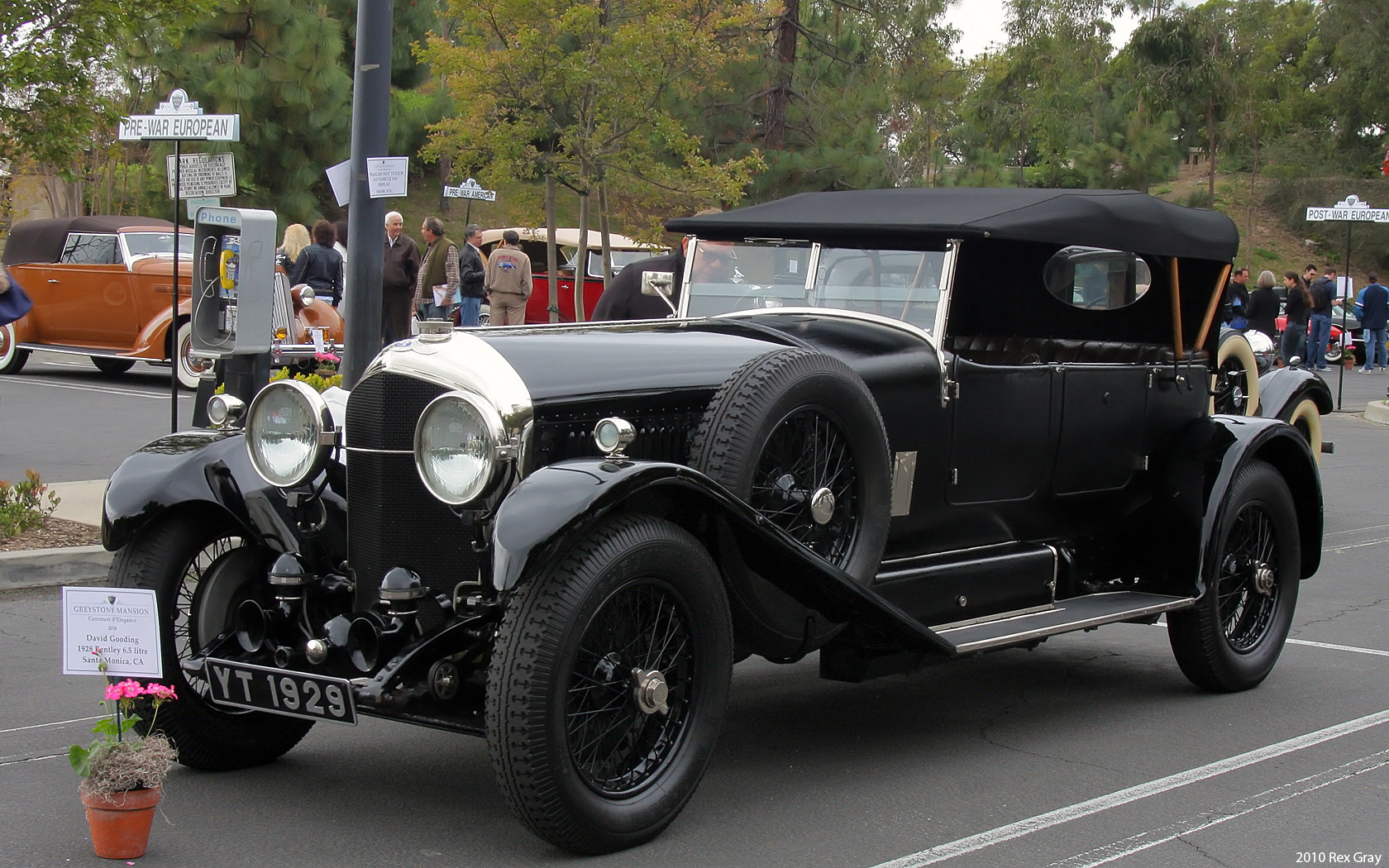
- A 1928 Bentley 6½ Litre Tourer

Overview
- Manufacturer: Bentley Motors
- Production: 1926–1930
- Assembly: Crewe, United Kingdom

Body and chassis
- Class: Luxury sports car
- Layout: Front-engine, rear-wheel-drive

Powertrain
- Engine: 6.6 L inline-6
- Transmission: 4-speed manual, non-synchromesh

Dimensions
- Wheelbase: 2984–3302 mm
- Length: 4420 mm
- Width: 1740 mm
- Curb weight: 2031–2286 kg

Chronology
- Predecessor: Bentley 3 Litre
- Successor: Bentley 4 Litre; Bentley 8 Litre

The Bentley 6½ Litre (also known as the Bentley 6.5 Litre) is a luxury sports car produced in the second half of the 1920s by the British manufacturer Bentley Motors. Designed with competition in mind, it was intended in part to succeed the Bentley 3 Litre, the company's first model. By 1926, the 3 Litre had achieved significant sporting success, including a victory at the 24 Hours of Le Mans. Created in 1923 and held on the Circuit de la Sarthe, this 24-hour endurance race quickly attracted numerous drivers and teams. Bentley became one of its regular entrants, officially competing in several events beginning in 1925.

However, competition became increasingly intense as the performance and top speeds of racing cars continued to improve. To remain competitive, Bentley developed its first inline six-cylinderengine, with a displacement of 6.6 litres and an output of 147 horsepower. Despite these efforts, the 6½ Litre experienced limited success in competition, contributing to financial and sporting difficulties for the company.

In 1928, Bentley introduced a more powerful version of the 6½ Litre, notably through the addition of a second carburettor. Known as the Bentley Speed Six, this improved version restored the reputation of the 6½ Litre by securing two consecutive victories at the 24 Hours of Le Mans in 1929 and 1930. In doing so, it succeeded the Bentley 3 Litre and the Bentley 4½ Litre, which had won the race in 1927 and 1928 respectively. These achievements established the Speed Six as one of the most renowned automobiles of the early twentieth century. They confirmed Bentley's status as one of the leading motor manufacturers of its era.

== Background and development ==
=== Early years at Le Mans ===
In the early 1920s, the Automobile Club de l'Ouest announced the creation of the 24 Hours of Le Mans, a 24-hour endurance race in which two drivers alternated between day and night. The event was primarily intended to promote the development and technical advancement of the automobile industry..

The first edition, held on 26–27 May 1923, featured mainly French drivers but already attracted considerable interest from competitors across Europe. In 1923 and 1924, Canadian driver John Duff and Briton Frank Clement entered a Bentley 3 Litre in the race. In 1924, after completing 120 laps of the Circuit de la Sarthe, they secured overall victory.

This victory was unexpected. Although aware of the promotional value of success in competition, W. O. Bentley had until then declined to enter the 24 Hours of Le Mans out of concern that a technical failure might damage the company's reputation. He maintained that his cars were not designed for sustained high-intensity use over such a long period. For this reason, John Duff, one of Bentley's earliest customers, competed at Le Mans in his own 3 Litre Sport. Nevertheless, W. O. Bentley supported the effort by recommending Frank Clement, one of the company's test drivers, as co-driver. Reassured by the 1924 success, Bentley officially entered a works team the following year, which included the two victorious drivers.Two 3 Litres were entered at the start of the 1925 24 Hours of Le Mans, but both were forced to retire due to various mechanical problems.

=== The first six-cylinder ===
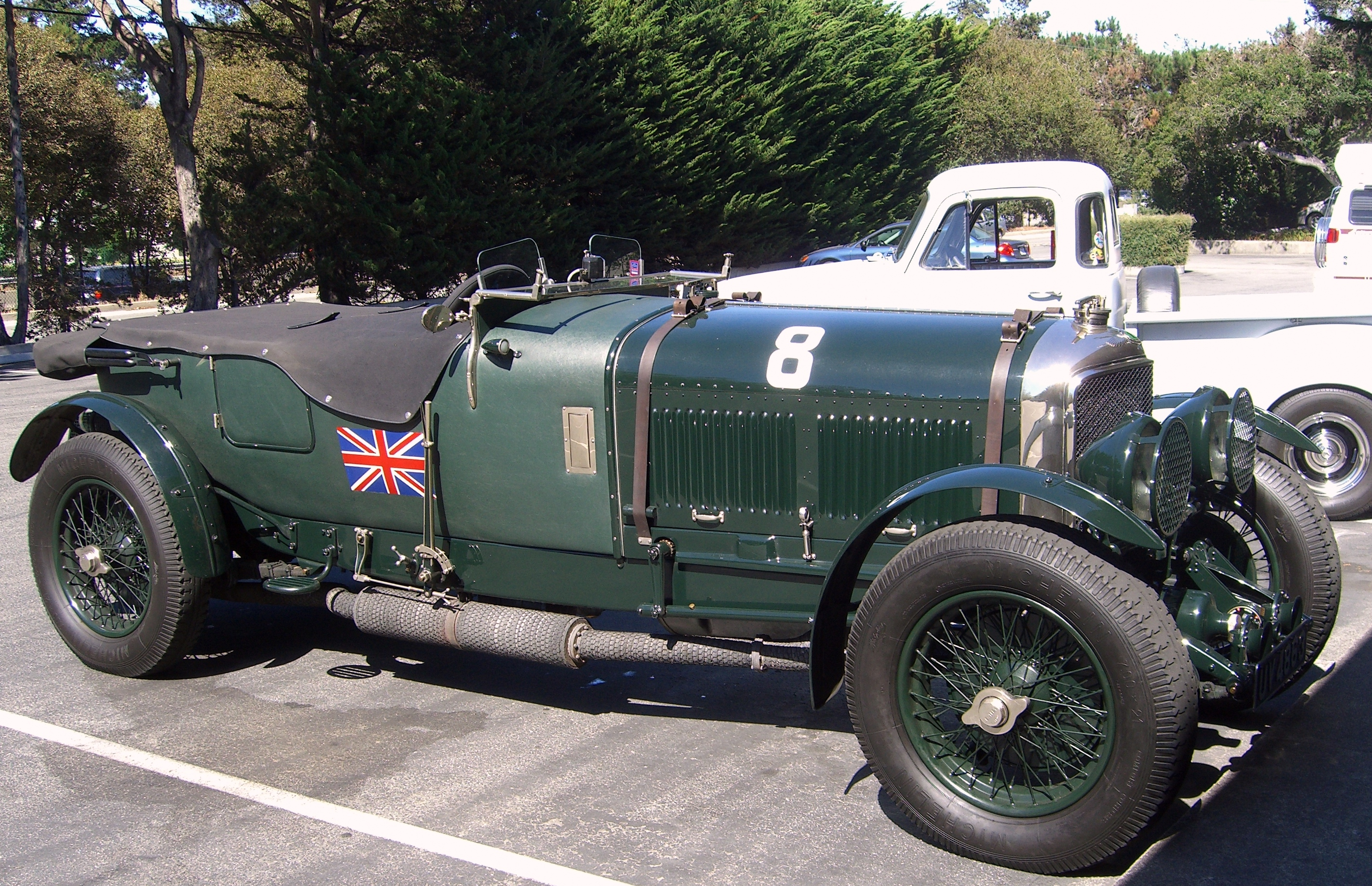
A Bentley Speed Six in its national racing livery, British Racing Green.

As the Bentley 3 Litre began to show its age—having been in production since 1921—Walter Owen Bentley considered developing a more powerful and higher-performing successor. The objective was also to meet the expectations of a wealthy clientele of gentleman drivers seeking "a large car capable in particular of carrying a heavy body without any significant loss of acceleration." By the late 1920s, automobiles were evolving from what had been described as "toys for boys" into practical and comfortable means of everyday transport. Coachbuilders increasingly produced closed bodies that were larger, more luxurious, and consequently heavier, requiring more powerful engines to maintain satisfactory performance.

Drawing inspiration from the 7.7-litre Rolls-Royce Phantom I, the British manufacturer developed an entirely new engine: its first inline six-cylinder unit, with a displacement of 6,597 cc, which gave rise to the name 6½ Litre. Despite producing 147 horsepower—nearly double the output of the Bentley 3 Litre—the Bentley 6½ Litre achieved no victories in competition. It was notably affected by premature and significant tyre wear during races. This issue was among the factors that led Bentley to develop the Bentley 4½ Litre in 1927.

It was not until October 1928, at the height of the so-called Bentley Boys—a group of wealthy British men, "united by their love of carefree living, high fashion, and speed," who were devoted to the marque's racing models and determined to restore Bentley's competitive success— that a reliable sporting version, nicknamed the Speed Six, emerged and achieved success in competition, at times even dominating events. The races in which it competed demonstrated that the car proved to be powerful, fast, and reliable—qualities regarded as essential in endurance racing.

== Technical characteristics ==
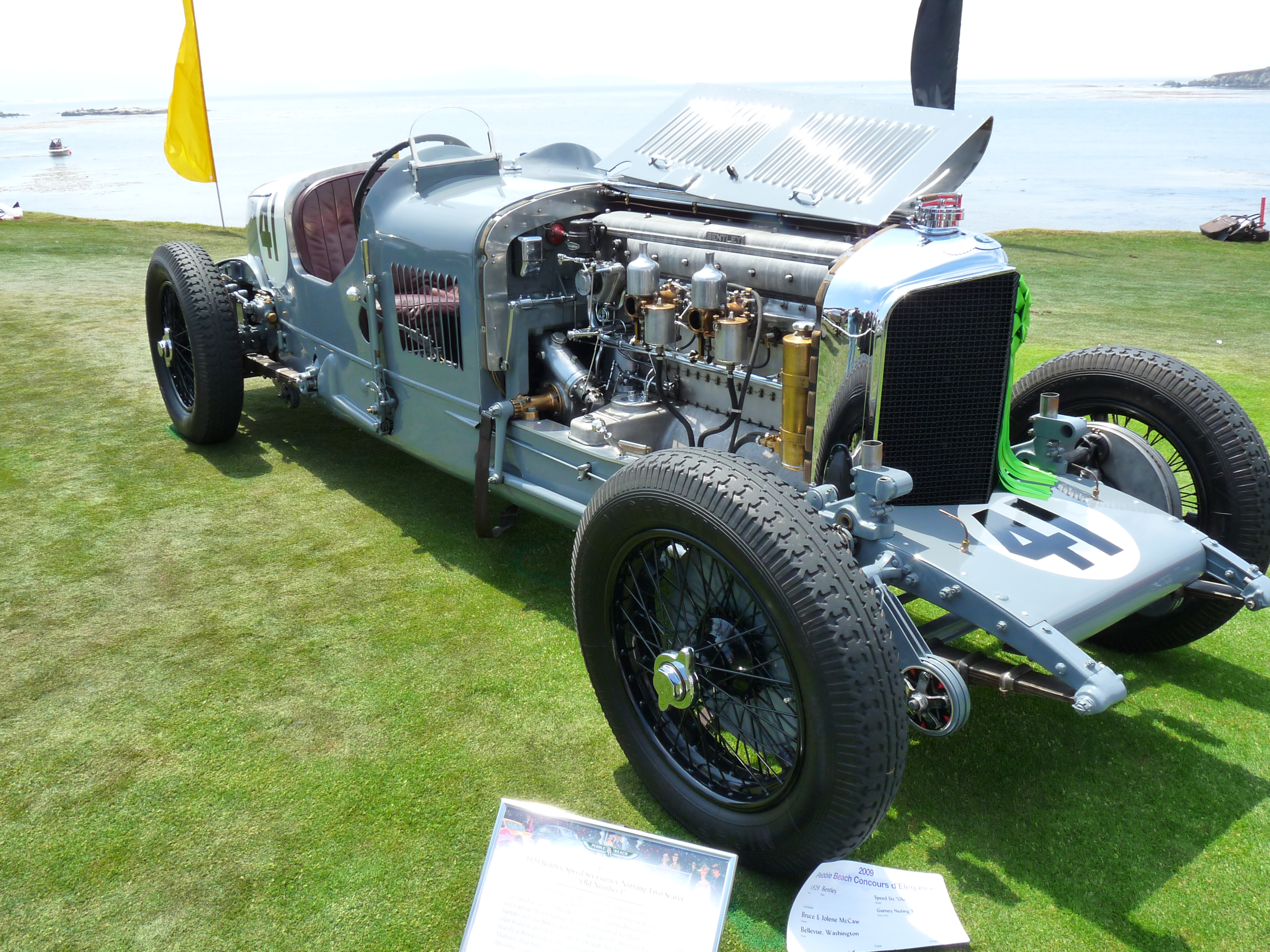
The inline six-cylinder engine of the Speed Six Old Number One on display.

Despite the five-year gap between their designs, the Bentley 6½ Litre and the Bentley 3 Litre were based on similar mechanical principles. The 6½ Litre's inline six-cylinder engine, constructed from a light alloy, retained most of the key features of the 3 Litre's four-cylinder unit. It employed a complex valvetrain system with a single overhead camshaft operating four valves per cylinder—a highly advanced design for the period, when most engines were equipped with only two valves per cylinder. Aluminium pistons were also among the major technical innovations introduced by Bentley. Ignition was provided by two spark plugs per cylinder, supplied by a Bosch magneto and a Delco dual-coil system.

The engine, whose displacement was increased to 6,597 cc through the addition of two cylinders and which was supplied by a single carburettor, produced 147 horsepower (108 kW). Power was transmitted to the rear wheels through a four-speed non-synchromesh manual gearbox. Its long-stroke dimensions (100 mm × 140 mm) provided high torque output.

The steel chassis adopted a conventional ladder-frame structure. The braking system was likewise of traditional design, operating large drum brakes by cable. These were considered effective in view of the car's substantial weight, which ranged from 2,031 kg to 2,286 kg. The suspension system was also conventional, consisting of semi-elliptic leaf springs supplemented by hydraulic shock absorbers. Depending on the version, the wheelbase varied between 2,984 mm and 3,302 mm.

Finally, the Bentley Speed Six differed from the Bentley 6½ Litre primarily through its higher compression ratio and the addition of a second carburettor, which increased output to 180 horsepower (134 kW) at 3,500 rpm. In 1929, this figure was further raised to 200 horsepower (147 kW). Its top speed reached approximately 150 km/h. Technically, it was also distinguished by a larger radiator, designed to dissipate the additional heat generated by the increased power output.

== Sporting results ==
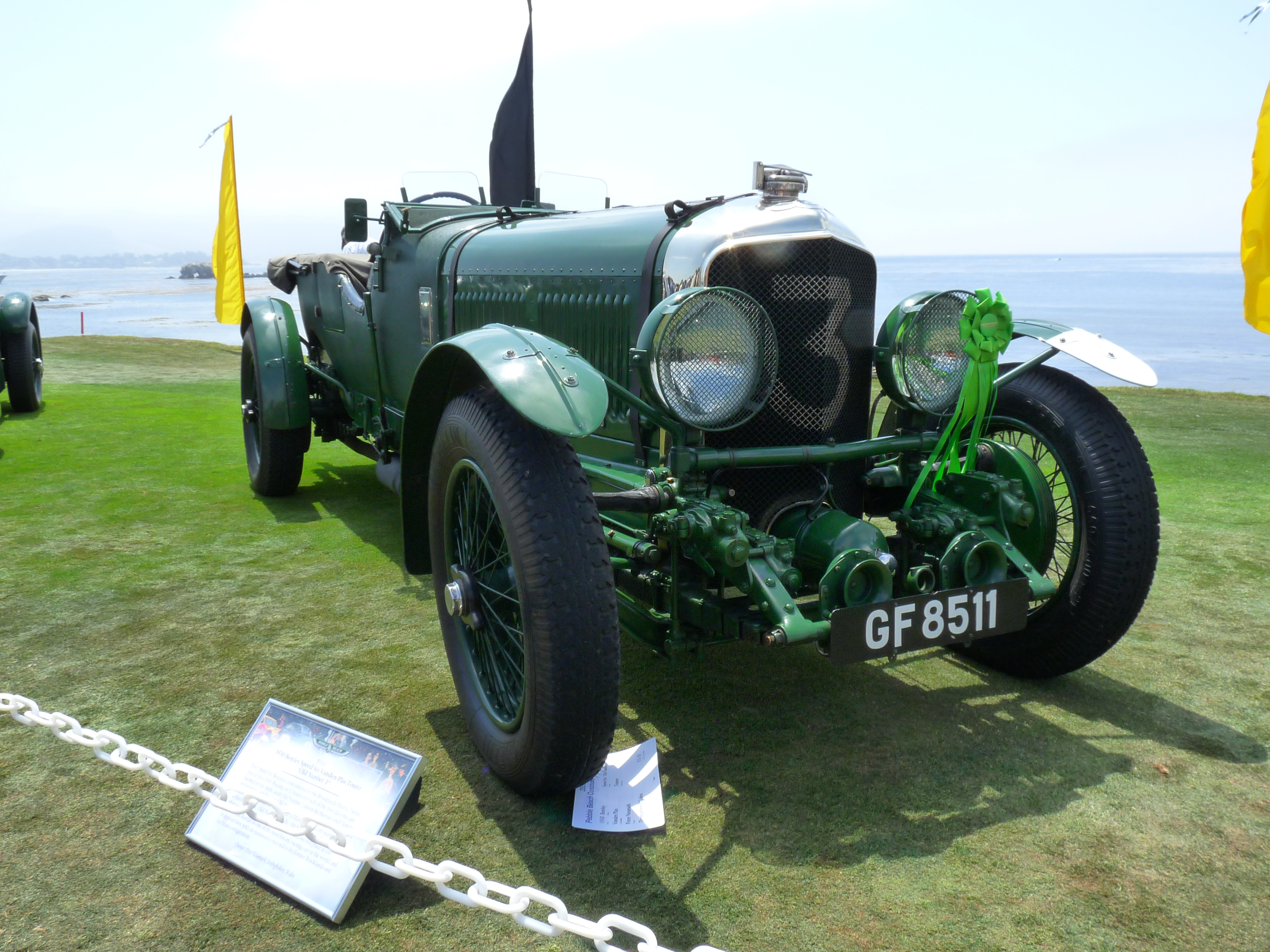
The Bentley Speed Six Old Number Three driven by Frank Clement and Richard Watney.

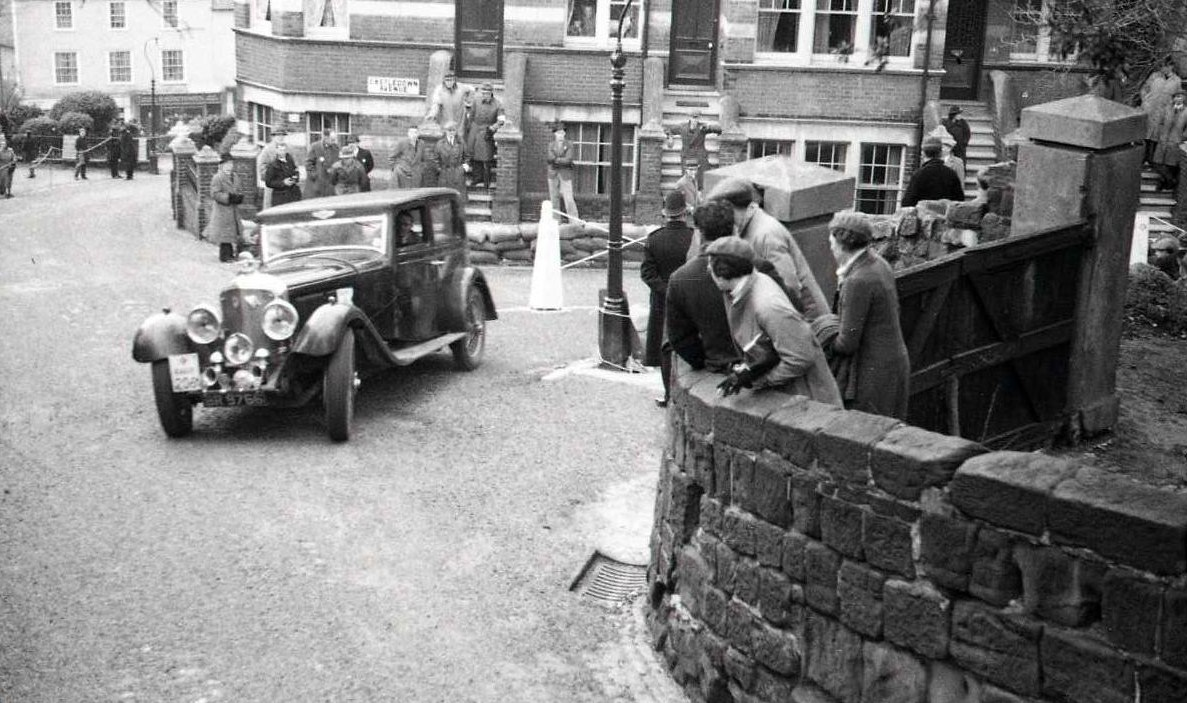
A 1929 Bentley Speed Six saloon, still competing in the RAC Rally in 1937.

In contrast to the Bentley 6½ Litre, which made little impression in Bentley's competition history, the Bentley Speed Six established an exceptional racing record in just two years. Its achievements notably included consecutive overall victories at the 24 Hours of Le Mans in 1929 and 1930.These back-to-back wins were particularly significant, as they followed two earlier Bentley successes at Le Mans—the Bentley 3 Litre in 1927 and the Bentley 4½ Litre in 1928—and enabled Woolf Barnato, regarded as the leader of the Bentley Boys, to accomplish the feat of winning the race in each of his three participations, each time with a different co-driver.

On 10 May 1929, the Bentley Speed Six "Old Number One" was entered in the Brooklands Double Twelve, a two-part endurance event consisting of two twelve-hour races. Owing to a dynamo failure, however, the car did not finish. Despite this setback, Old Number One started the 24 Hours of Le Mans the following month, driven by Woolf Barnato and Henry Birkin. After completing 174 laps, the car secured overall victory ahead of three Bentley 4½ Litre entries, resulting in a notable podium finish in the history of the Le Mans race. Encouraged by the enthusiasm generated by this success, Bentley subsequently entered the car in the Brooklands Six Hours, which it won.

In 1930, three Bentley Speed Six cars and two Bentley Blower models (supercharged versions of the Bentley 4½ Litre) were entered in the 24 Hours of Le Mans. The latter two, affected by reliability problems, did not play a decisive role in the contest, which developed into a duel between the Speed Six and the supercharged 7-litre Mercedes-Benz SS. Woolf Barnato's Bentley, "Old Number Two," was initially outpaced by the Mercedes but took the lead on the 36th lap. To regain first place, the Mercedes was obliged to use its supercharger repeatedly, a strategy that risked damaging its engine. Barnato maintained his position, and he and Glen Kidston ultimately secured victory. Frank Clement and Richard Watney finished in second place.

That same year, Bentley also achieved a one-two finish at the Brooklands Double Twelve.

== Blue Train Race ==
=== Race narrative ===
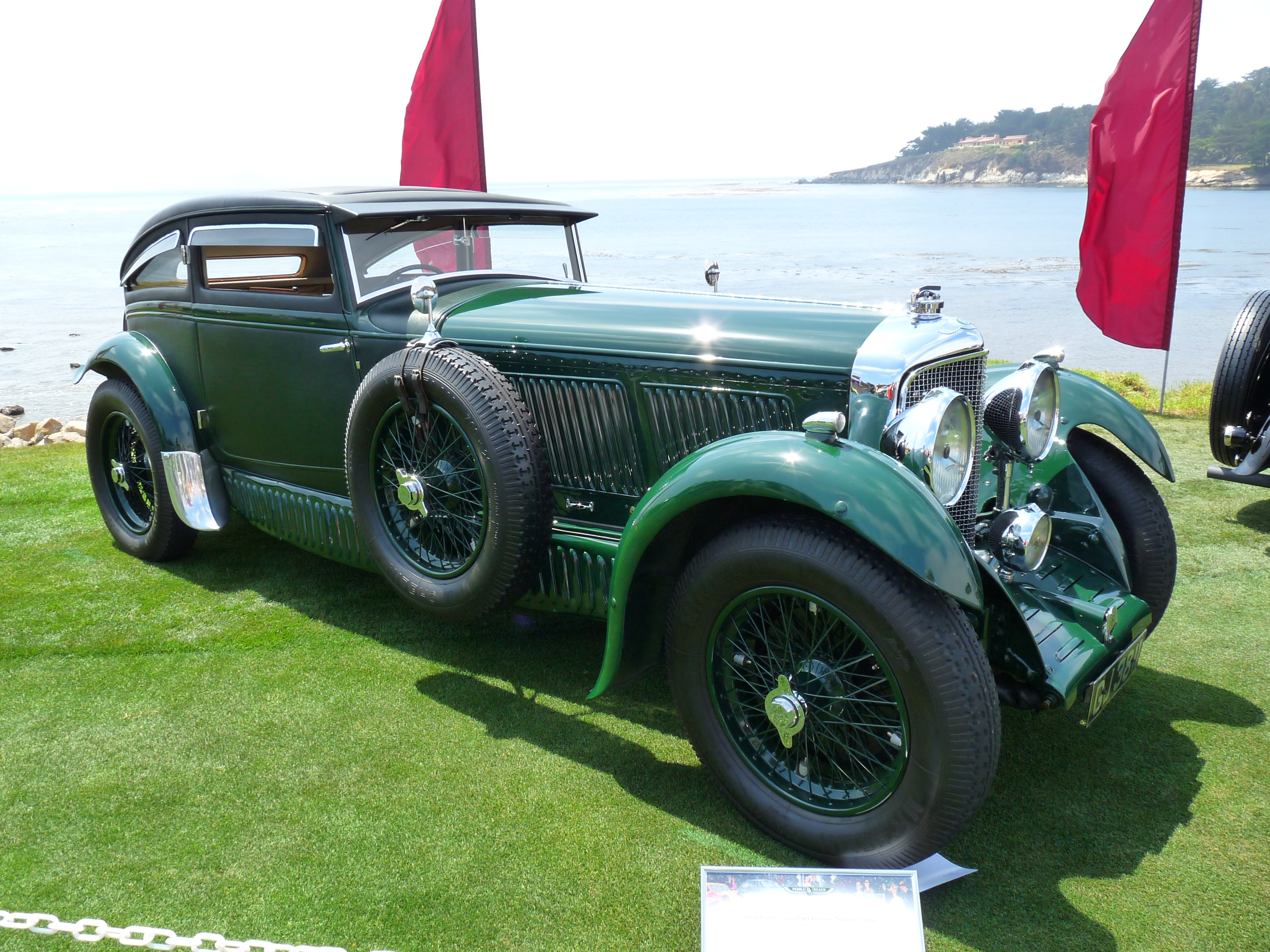
The Bentley Speed Six "Blue Train Special".

In January 1930, the British manufacturer Rover Company gained significant international attention following the success of its Rover Light Six in the so-called "Blue Train race," an informal contest between motor cars and the famous Le Train Bleu linking Calais and Cannes. In March 1930, during an evening event at the Hôtel Carlton, Woolf Barnato argued that there was little merit in merely travelling faster than the Blue Train. He wagered £200 that, driving his own Bentley Speed Six, he could reach London before the Blue Train arrived in Calais.

On 13 March 1930 at 5:45 pm, as the Le Train Bleu departed from Cannes station, Woolf Barnato and his friend Dale Bourne set off from the Croisette in Bernato's Bentley Speed Six.The journey was not without difficulty. In France, the two drivers encountered heavy rain followed by dense fog. At 4:20 am, they also lost a considerable amount of time searching for a refuelling point in Auxerre. They arrived at the port of Calais at 10:30 am, where they boarded a ferry to England. Their journey concluded at 3:20 p.m. in St James's Street, London—only four minutes before the Blue Train pulled into Calais. Although Barnato succeeded in winning the bet, the penalty levied by the French authorities for speeding on public roads ultimately surpassed the amount he had wagered.

=== Confusion surrounding the "Blue Train" Speed Six ===
For many years, uncertainty persisted regarding the identity of the Bentley Speed Six used in the Blue Train challenge. The car driven by Barnato during the event was a model bodied by H. J. Mulliner & Co. Following the victory, it became known as the "Blue Train Bentley." Two months later, on 21 May 1930, Barnato acquired another Speed Six, a fastback "Sportsman Coupé" bodied by Gurney Nutting. He named this car the "Blue Train Special" in commemoration of his achievement. The similarity between the two names led to confusion between the cars. Over time, the Gurney Nutting-bodied version came to be widely, though incorrectly, regarded as the car that had taken part in the Blue Train run, and it consequently became associated with the name "Blue Train Bentley" in popular memory.

The confusion was sustained by numerous articles and paintings depicting the event. In particular, the well-known painting by Terence Cuneo, which portrays the Gurney Nutting-bodied Bentley competing against the Le Train Bleu, contributed significantly to the misunderstanding. Even in 2005, during the 75th anniversary of the challenge, Bentley's communications department conflated the two cars. Due to the research efforts of Bruce and Jolene McCaw, who became the owners of the Gurney Nutting-bodied Bentley Speed Six, the error is now less widespread. The original Mulliner body was later reconstructed and is also owned by the McCaws.

== Epilogue ==
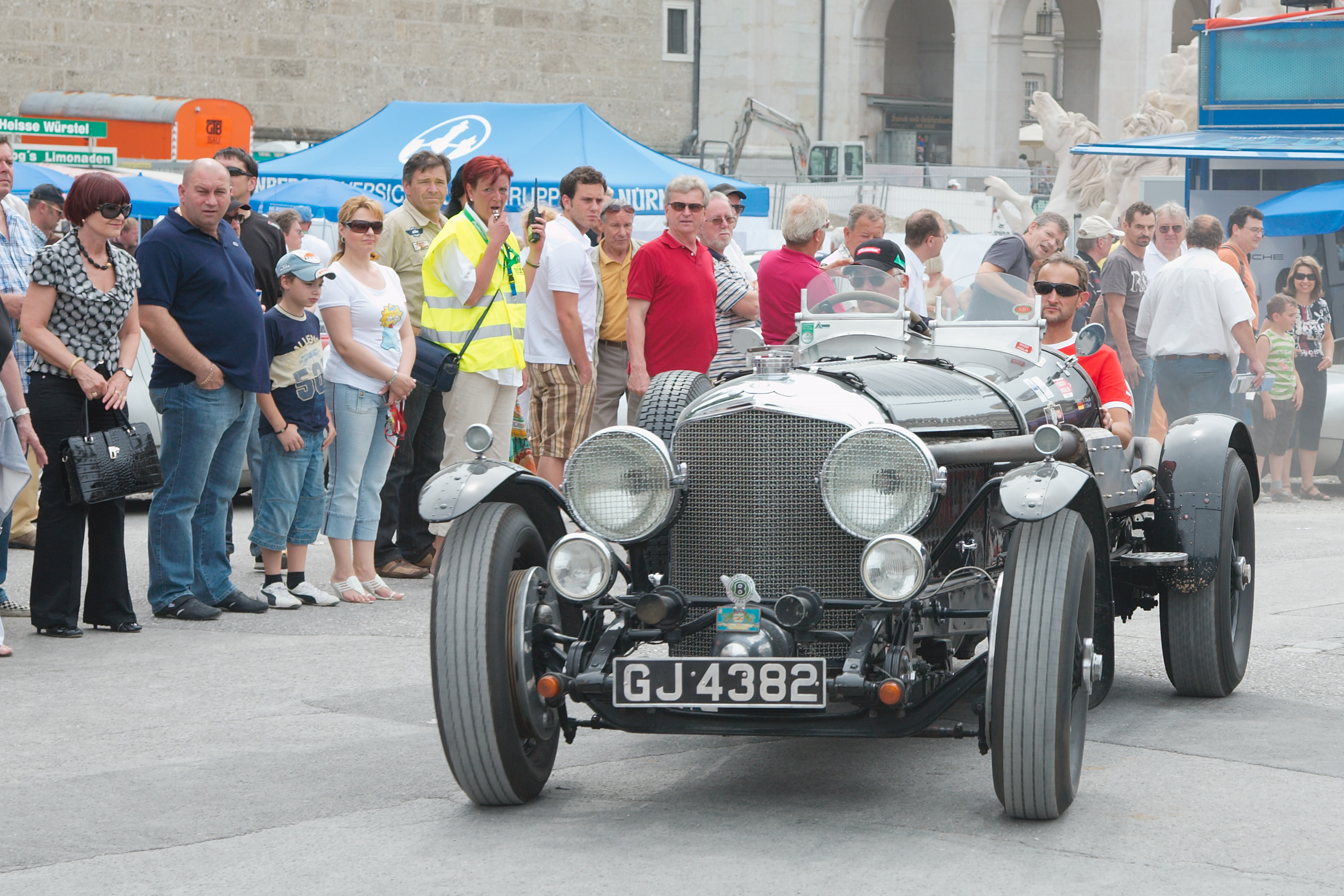
A Speed Six at the Gaisbergrennen in 2009.

Despite its relatively modest sporting record, the Bentley 6½ Litre was produced in 363 examples between 1926 and 1930. Its competition derivative, the Bentley Speed Six, was built in 182 units from 1928 to 1930. The Speed Six's highly celebrated triumphs—most notably at the 24 Hours of Le Mans and on the Brooklands circuit—greatly strengthened both the car's reputation and that of Bentley as a manufacturer. Woolf Barnato’s central involvement in these achievements also played a key role in shaping the marque's legacy and reinforcing the lasting legend of the Bentley Boys.

The association between Bentley and the Bentley Boys—and in particular with Woolf Barnato—effectively came to an end with the Speed Six. In the early 1930s, the prosperity of the Roaring Twenties gave way abruptly to the aftermath of the Wall Street Crash of 1929. Bentley once again faced serious financial difficulties, which Barnato was no longer able to resolve without jeopardizing his personal fortune. The expensive development program for the six-cylinder engine used in the Bentley 6½ Litre played a substantial role in increasing the company's financial liabilities. At the same time, demand weakened, as Bentley's vehicles—priced between £2,300 and £2,500 for a Speed Six—were beyond the reach of many potential buyers. In 1931, Walter Owen Bentley was forced to relinquish control of the firm, which was subsequently purchased in November by Rolls-Royce Limited for £125,175.

Today, the Bentley 6½ Litre and Bentley Speed Six—of which most of the 545 examples produced are still in existence—are generally valued between $400,000 and $600,000. However, prices vary considerably depending on a car's competition history and its degree of originality.

== See also ==
- Bentley Motors
- Bentley 4½ Litre
- Bentley 8 Litre
- Rolls-Royce Phantom I

== Gallery ==
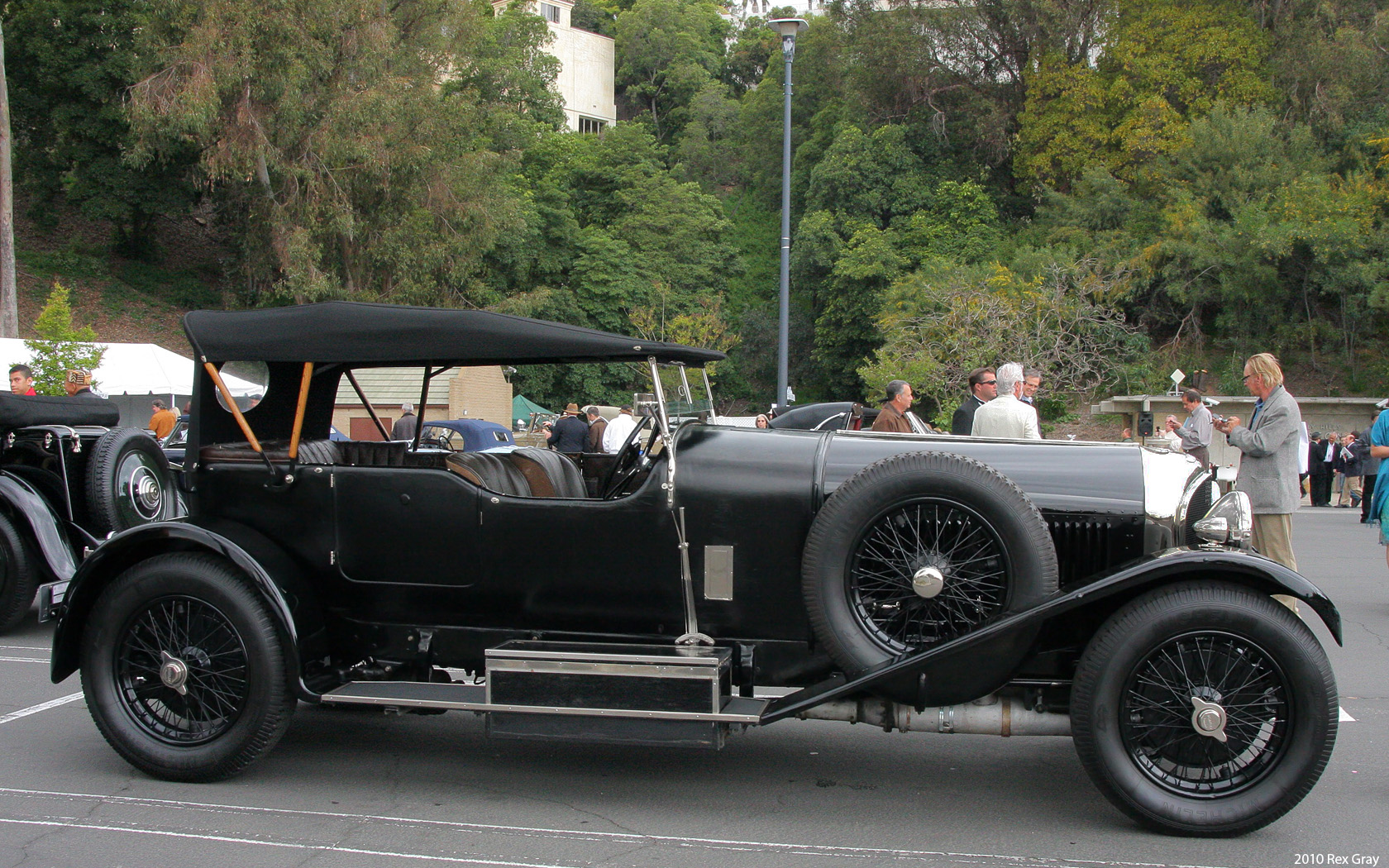
Bentley 6½ Litre Tourer

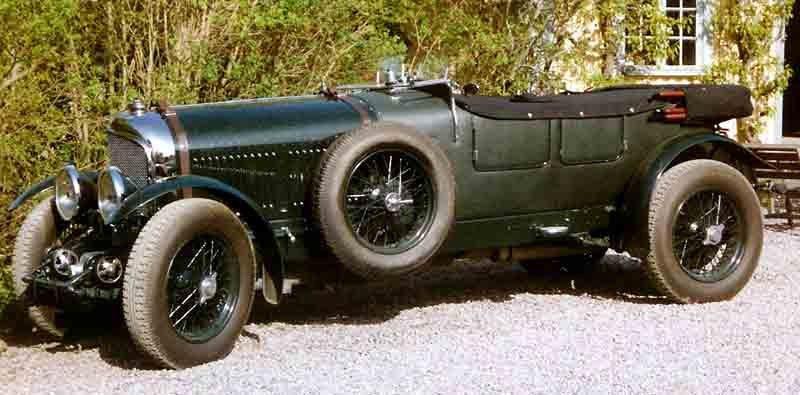
Bentley 6½-Litre Tourer

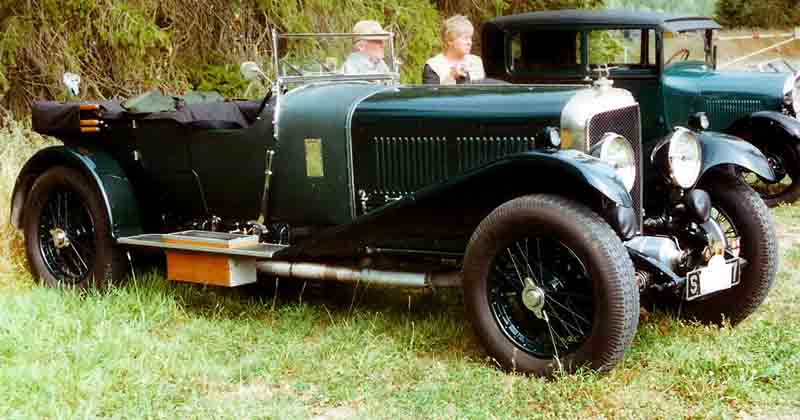
Bentley 6½-Litre Speed Six Tourer 1930
