= Bentley 8 Litre =

Bentley 8 Litre chassis
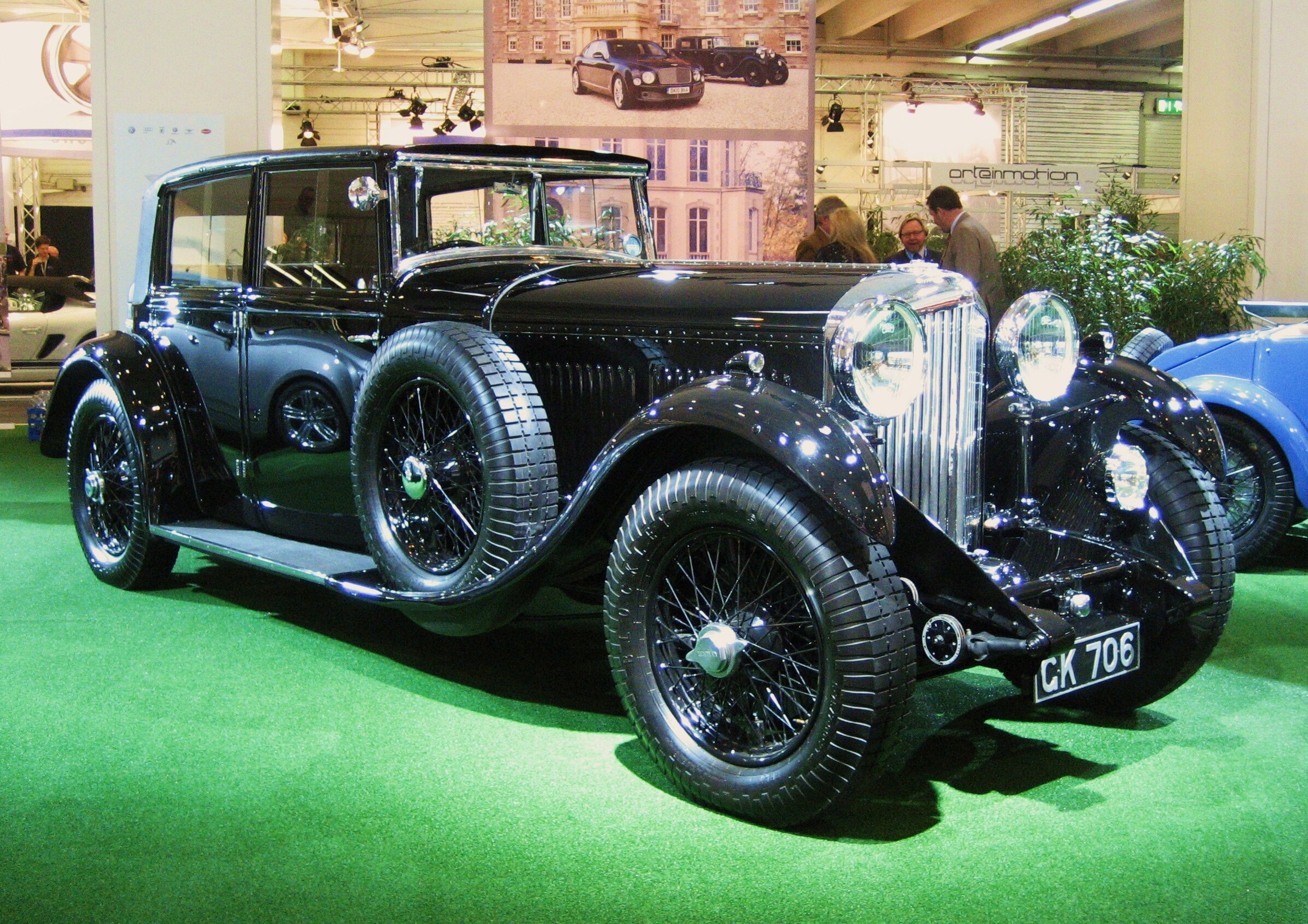
- Weymann saloon by Mulliner the second car made and W. O. Bentley's personal transport

Overview
- Manufacturer: Bentley Motors Limited
- Production: 1930–1932; 100 produced
- Assembly: United Kingdom: Cricklewood, London
- Designer: W. O. Bentley

Body and chassis
- Class: Ultra-luxury car
- Body style: purchaser to arrange with own coachbuilder
- Layout: FR layout
- Related: Bentley 4-Litre (economy version)

Powertrain
- Engine: SOHC 8 L I6
- Transmission: Manual gearbox, 4-speeds and reverse; Single-dry-plate clutch; Hypoid bevel final drive

Dimensions
- Wheelbase: 138 in (3,505 mm) (3 only); 134 in (3,404 mm); 140 in (3,556 mm)
- Length: 201.25 in (5,112 mm); 213.25 in (5,417 mm)
- Width: 68.5 in (1,740 mm)
- Height: depending on coachwork
- Kerb weight: 2.5 tonnes (5500 lb.) or more, depending on coachwork

Bentley 8-litre engine
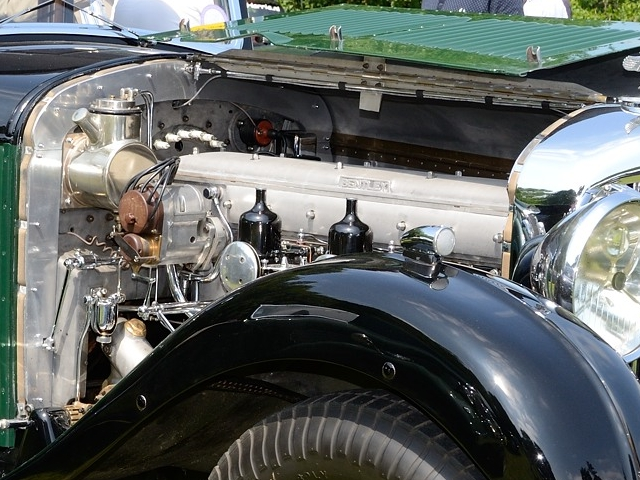

Overview
- Production: 1930–1932

Layout
- Configuration: 6-cylinder in-line
- Displacement: 7,983 cubic centimetres (487 cu in)
- Cylinder bore: 110 mm (4.3 in)
- Piston stroke: 140 mm (5.5 in)
- Cylinder block material: cast iron monobloc with; elektron crankcase
- Cylinder head material: non-detachable – see block
- Valvetrain: single overhead camshaft driven by patented triple connecting rods; 4-valves-per-cylinder
- Compression ratio: 5:1

Combustion
- Fuel system: Autovac fuel lifter; Twin SU carburettors; Twin-spark magneto & coil
- Fuel type: petrol
- Cooling system: Water-cooled, with pump, fan and thermostatically-controlled shutters

Output
- Power output: 220 bhp (160 kW; 220 PS) @3,300rpm; Tax rating 44.9 hp (RAC Rating)

The Bentley 8 Litre was a large inline 6-cylinder luxury car made in various configurations by Bentley Motors Limited at Cricklewood, London. Announced 15 September 1930, it was also the last completely new model by Bentley before the company's financial collapse and forced sale to Rolls-Royce Limited.

A Bentley 4 Litre featuring a 4-litre, inline-6 engine in a shortened chassis was announced on 15 May 1931.

Introduced a year into the Great Depression, the 8-litre and its smaller 4-litre sibling were unable to turn the company's finances around. Less than nine months after the 8-litre's introduction, Bentley Motors was placed into receivership.

== Design and specifications ==
=== Engine ===
The straight-six engine used a one-piece cast-iron block and non-detachable cylinder head with a crankcase made from Elektron, a magnesium alloy. It featured an overhead camshaft driven by a Bentley patented "three-throw drive" system of triple coupling rods with, like all earlier Bentleys, four valves per cylinder and twin-spark ignition (separate coil and magneto systems), which were state-of-the-art at the time. The engine had a bore of 110 mm (4.3 in) and a stroke of 140 mm (5.5 in), giving a capacity of 7,983 cc (487.2 cu in). Pistons were of an aluminium alloy.

Both engine and gearbox were mounted each at three points on rubber to isolate the chassis and body from vibration.

=== Transmission ===
An entirely new design of four-speed gearbox provided four speeds (constant mesh third) and reverse with a single-plate dry clutch which sent power through a hypoid bevel final drive to the rear axle and its 21" Rudge-Whitworth wire centre-lock wheels.

=== Chassis ===
The 8 Litre was built on Bentley's largest rolling chassis, a ladder frame with large tubular steel crossmembers downswept from the front and rear axles towards the centre to lower the centre of gravity.

Neither engine nor gearbox contributed to the bracing of the chassis.

Suspension by long semi-elliptic leaf springs was controlled by double-acting dampers, friction on the front and hydraulic on the rear axle, and all four wheels were fitted with Dewandre vacuum-servo-assisted 400 mm (15.7 in) drum brakes, the forward brakes being of Bentley-Perrott design.

Steering was by worm and sector and castor action could be adjusted to suit individual taste.

There was centralised chassis lubrication including the gaitered springs but not for the front axle or the clutch withdrawal system.

The 8-Litre chassis was available with either a 144-inch (3,700 mm) wheelbase or a longer 156-inch (4,000 mm) wheelbase. Three were built with a 138-inch (3,500 mm) wheelbase.

The manufacturer claimed a maximum speed of approximately 125 mph (201 km/h). A speed in excess of 104 mph (167 km/h) was guaranteed by the manufacturer, even when specified with the heaviest saloon bodies.

== Reception ==
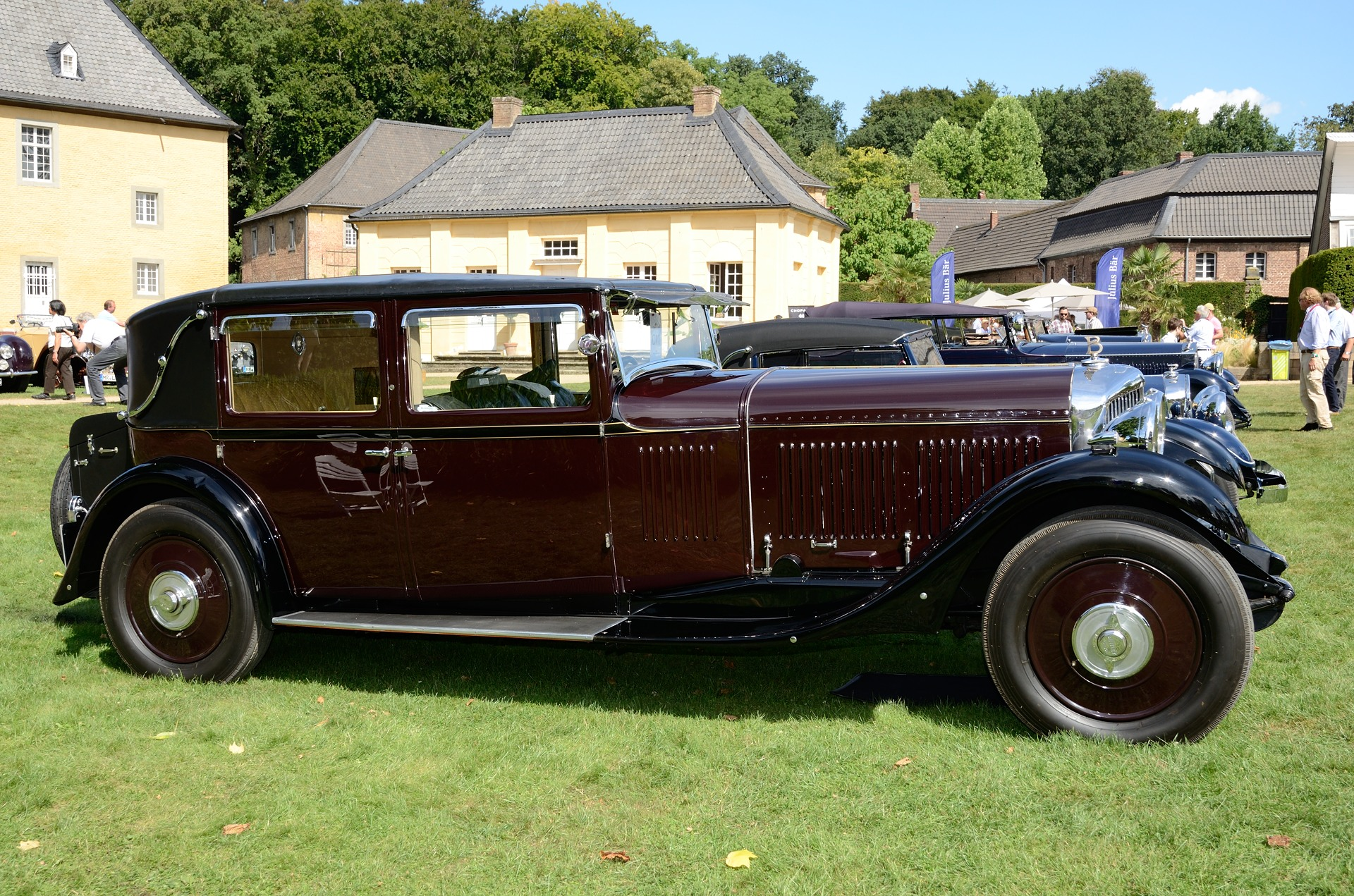
Weymann saloon by H. J. Mulliner YF5001: the first 8 Litre made; built for entertainer Jack Buchanan.

Announced on 15 September 1930 and launched at the London Olympia Motor Show in October 1930, the 8 Litre Bentley was noted for its tractability and smoothness; it could be driven from walking pace to highway speeds in top gear without effort.

As a result of the worldwide Great Depression, the 8 Litre did not sell well enough to improve Bentley's financial situation. The chassis was priced at £1,850, roughly equivalent to £293,000 in 2010.

Only 100 of these cars were made, of which 35 were on the shorter wheelbase. Fewer than 25 were fitted with open bodies. It is suggested that the cost of the development of the car was a prime reason for Bentley Motors going bankrupt.

Bentley made one more attempt at financial recovery by installing modified Ricardo 4-litre engines in a shortened 8-Litre chassis and selling the result as the Bentley 4 Litre. Announced on 15 May 1931, only 50 were made before Bentley Motors Ltd. was placed into receivership.

When Rolls-Royce bought Bentley Motors from the receiver in November 1931, it discontinued production of the 8-Litre and disposed of all spare parts for it.

== Legacy ==
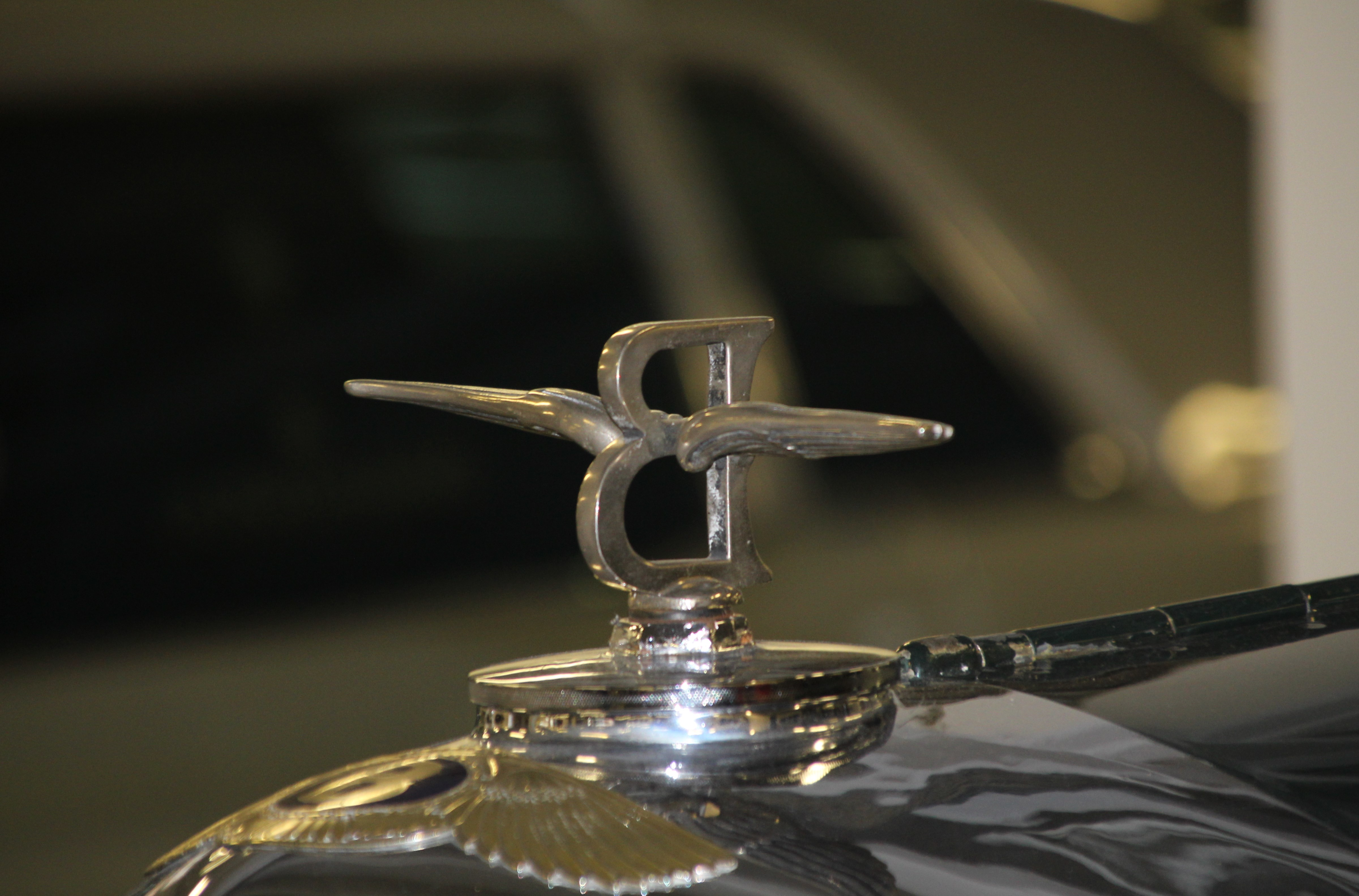
Bentley "Flying B" hood ornament

Seventy-eight Bentley 8 Litre cars were known to survive as at mid-2011. Many of these have had their original limousine or saloon bodies replaced by new replica tourer bodies. As a result, Bentley 8 Litres with original bodies are much sought after by collectors.

The only Bentley 8 Litre with an American body, which was also the first Bentley with an all-metal body, was built by the W.M. Murphy Company of Pasadena for a customer in Santa Barbara, California.

McKenzie's Garages, a specialist in Rolls-Royce and Bentley cars, modified four 8 Litres in the 1930s: YM5050 (given a shortened chassis, lowered radiator and bulkhead, and triple SU carburettors); YR5083 (with a higher-ratio rear axle and triple SU carburettors); YX5117 (with a lowered and shortened chassis and triple SU carburettors); and YX5121 (with a shortened and lowered chassis and a tuned engine)

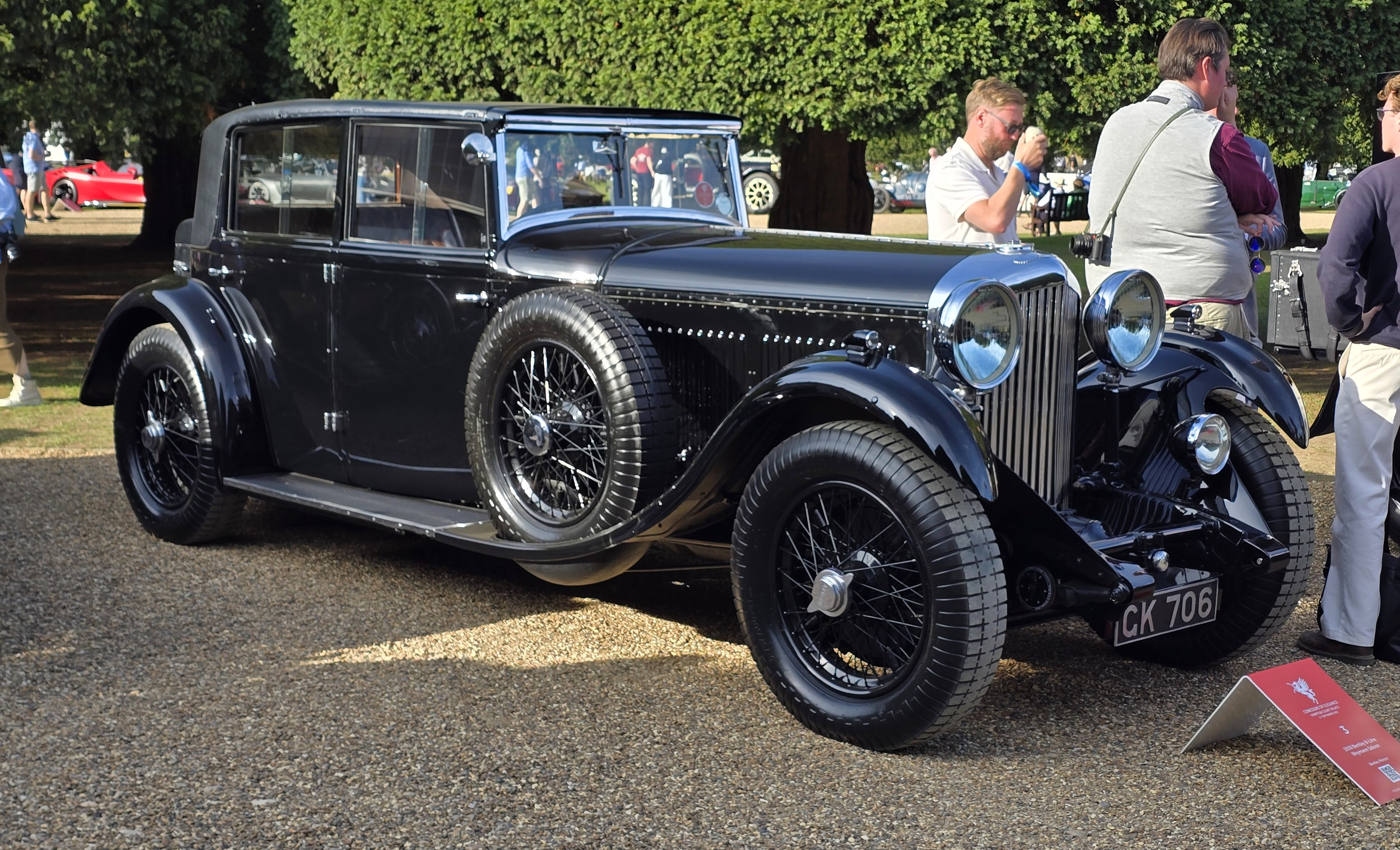
1930 Bentley 8 Litre Weymann Saloon

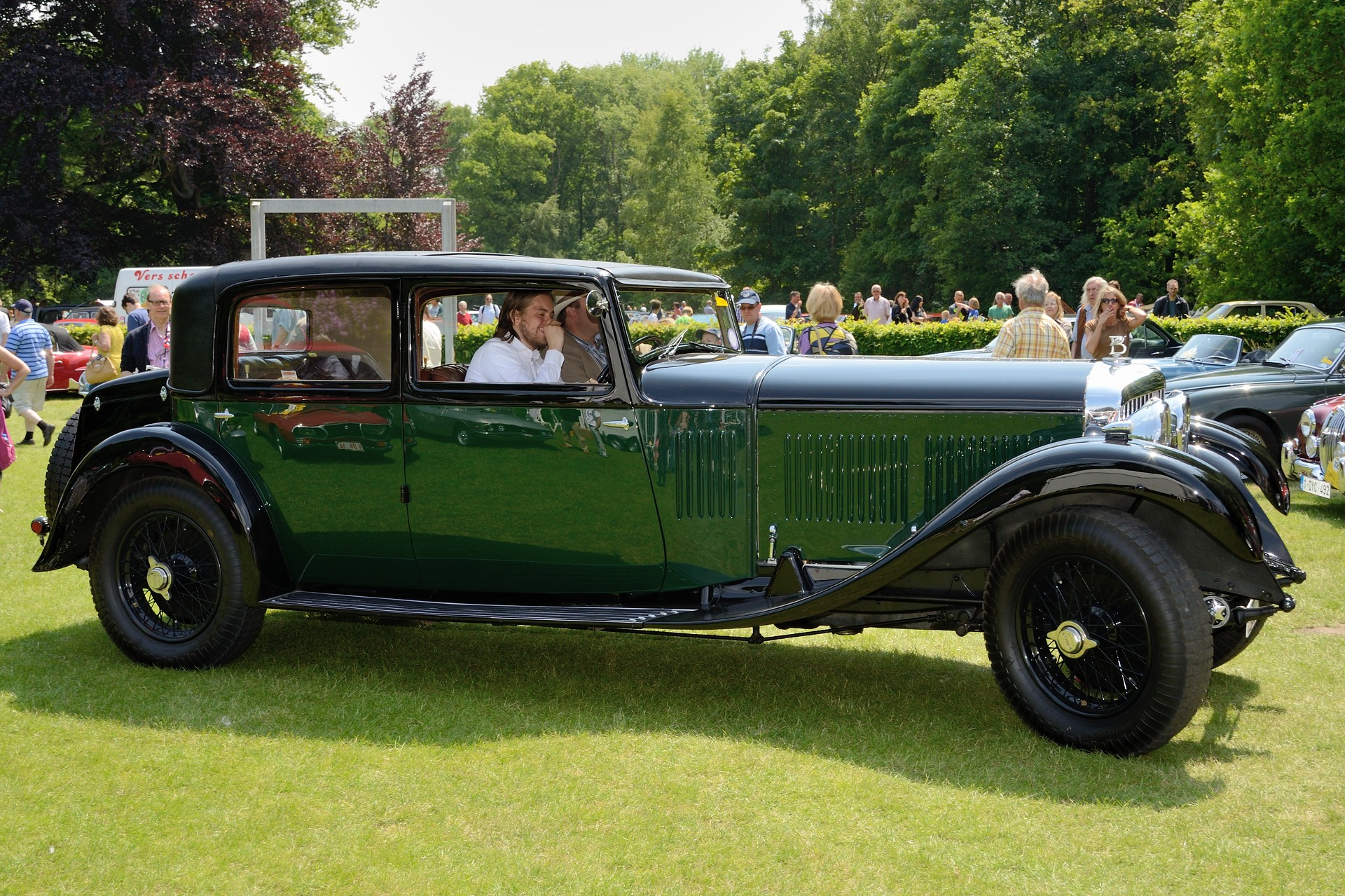
Bentley 8-litre saloon by H J Mulliner 1932 Chassis YM5039

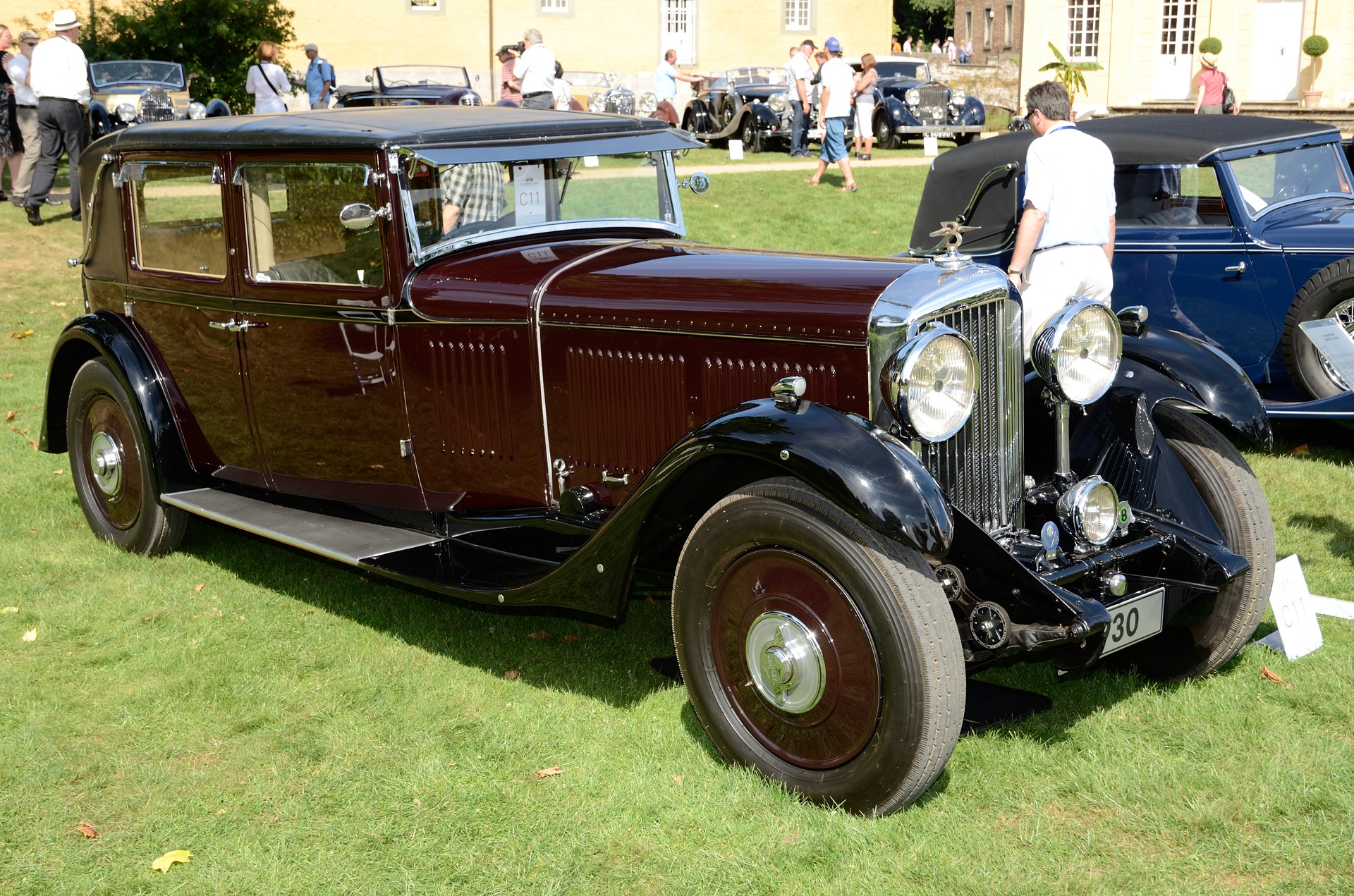
Bentley 8-litre 4-light sports saloon Weymann fabric by H J Mulliner 1930

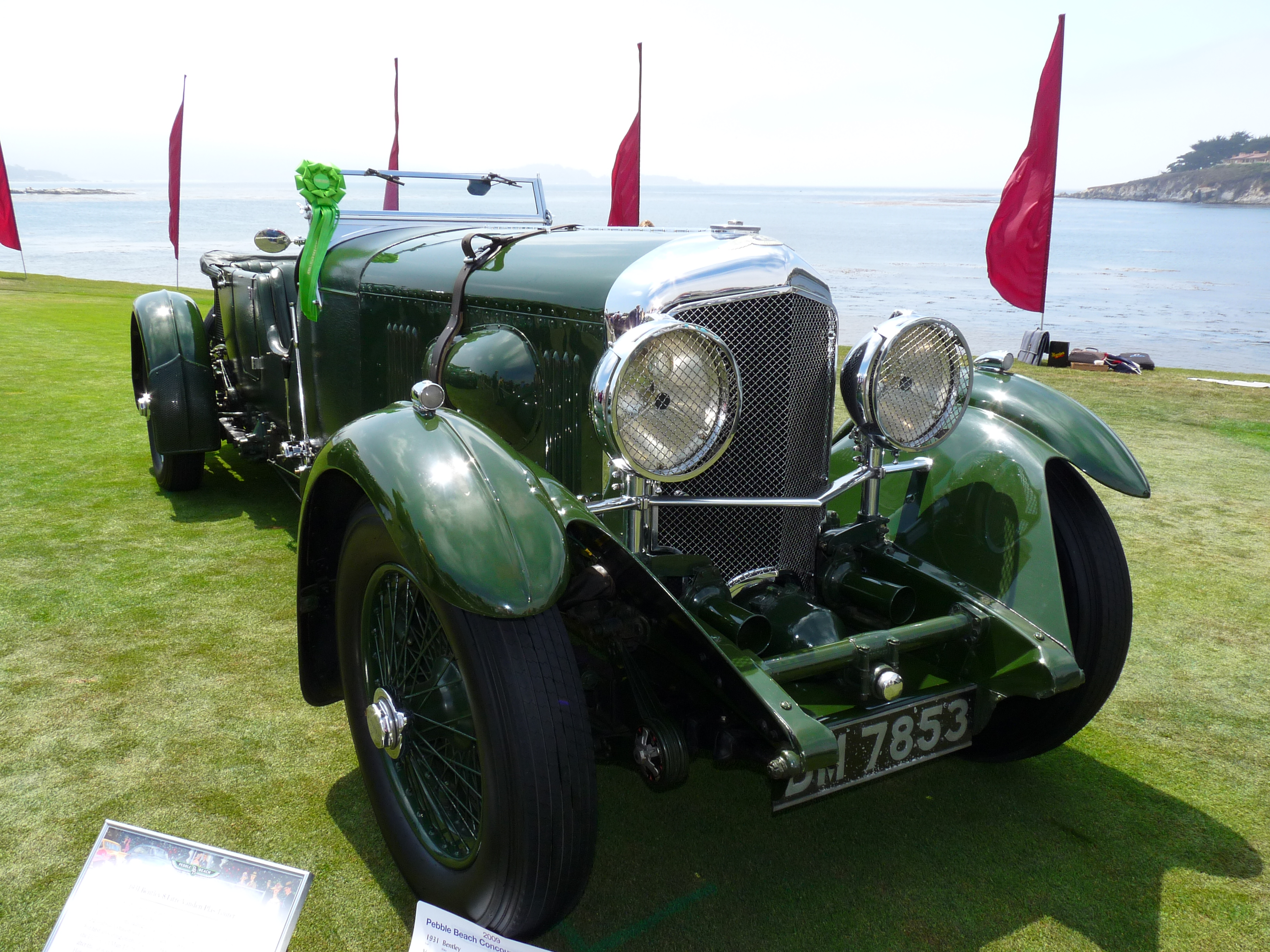
1931 Bentley 8 Litre Vanden Plas Tourer

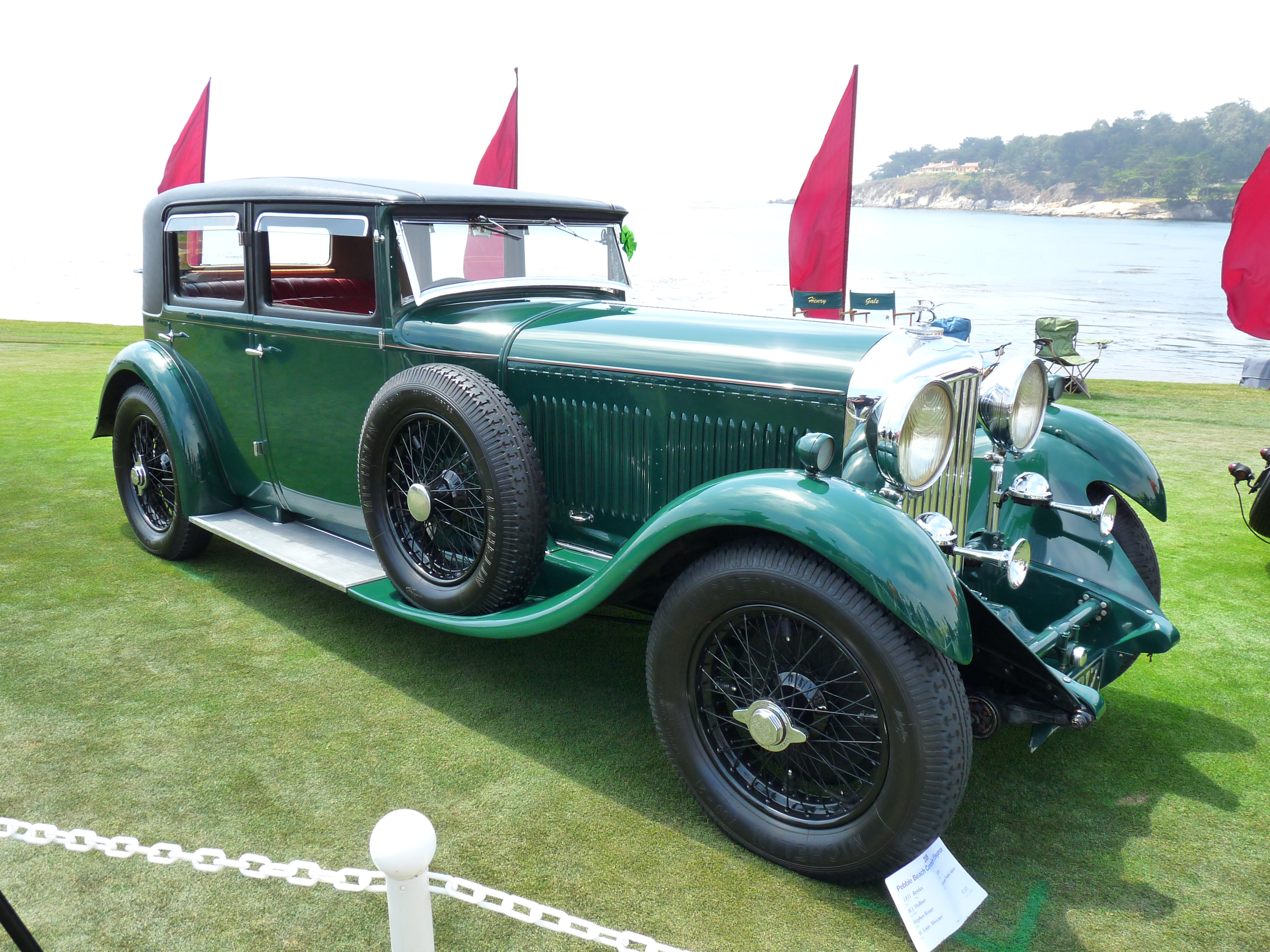
Bentley 8 litre Vanden Plas Tourer 1931 Chassis YX5115

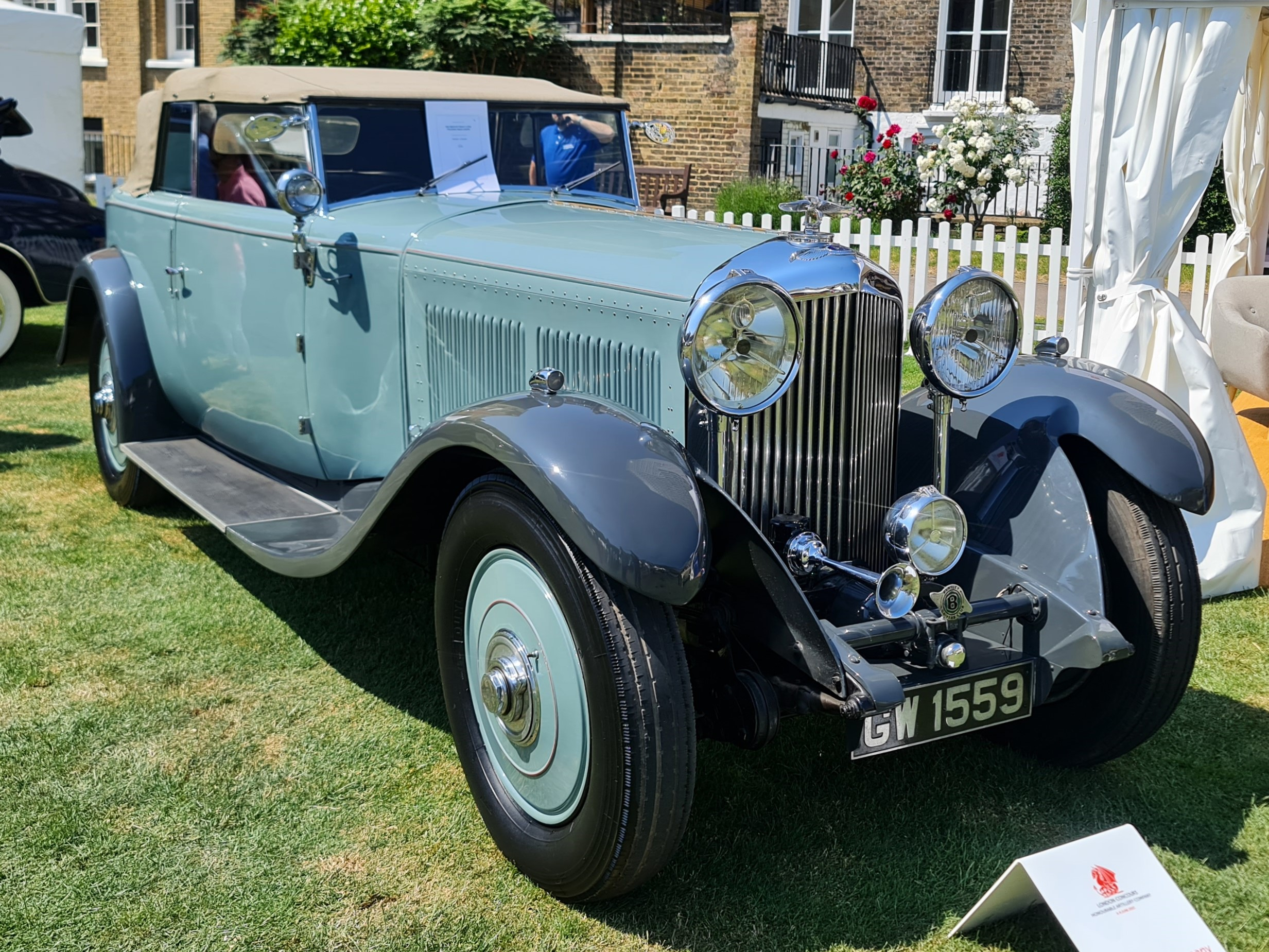
1931 Bentley 8 Litre Folding Head Coupe SWB by Mulliner

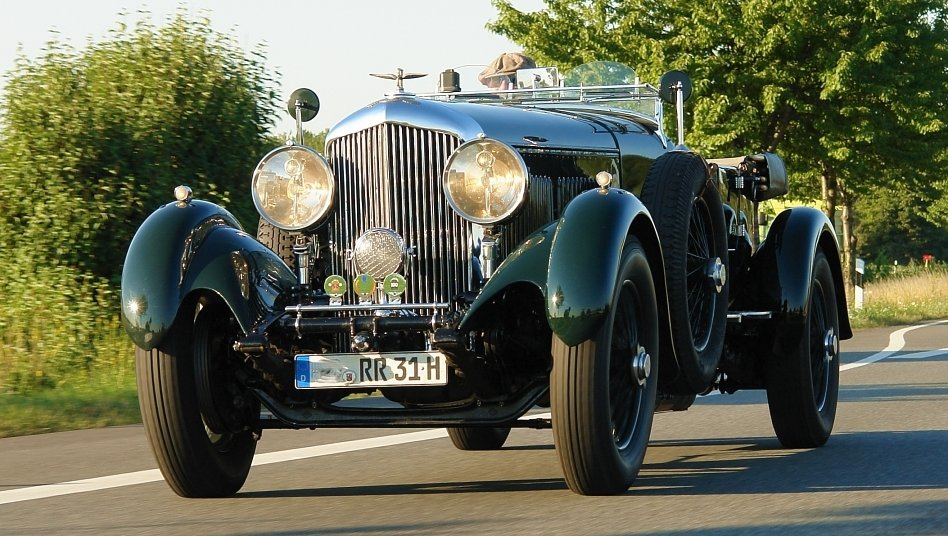
Saloon rebodied with a replica tourer body

== See also ==
- Bentley 6½ Liter

== Bibliography ==
- Brooks, Philip C. (2009). Carpenter, Rhonda; Iwalani, Kahikina (eds.). "The Mighty Sixes". The International Club for Rolls-Royce & Bentley Owners Desk Diary 2010. Tampa, FL USA: Faircount: 26–35.
- Buckley, Martin (2004). "2 Exclusivity assured, luxury unlimited". Cars of the Super Rich: The Opulent, the Original and the Outrageous. St. Paul, MN USA: Motorbooks International. pp. 42–43. ISBN 0-7603-1953-7. "Too many of these fabulous cars have lost their original bodywork in favour of replica open-tourers, but the survival rate of the 8-litre is high. ...Few remaining cars now have original saloon bodywork.""
- Eybl, Eckhard (7 March 2001). Ostmann, Bernd (ed.). "Achttausender". Auto, Motor und Sport. 2001 Heft 6: 192–197.
- Feast, Richard (2004). "When Barnato bought Bentley". The DNA of Bentley. St. Paul MN USA: MotorBooks International. pp. 64–65. ISBN 9780760319468.
- Hay, Clare (2011). Bentley Eight Litre. Number One Press. ISBN 978-0-95358-272-3.
- Johnson, Harvey (Fall 2011). Verschoor, Ron (ed.). "The Eight-Litre: Bentley's Last is Bentley's Best". The Classic Car. LIX (3). Beverley Hills, CA USA: Classic Car Club of America: 3–11. ISSN 0009-8310. "Of the 100 Bentley Eight-Litre models (sic) produced, 78 are known to exist today."
- King, Tom, ed. (2008). "The Derby Bentley Turns 75 Years Old" (PDF). New Zealand Rolls-Royce & Bentley Club Inc. (8–6). Christchurch, NZ: New Zealand Rolls-Royce & Bentley Club, Inc: 16–19. Archived from the original (PDF) on 19 April 2014. "Rolls-Royce Limited bought Bentley Motors through a nominee company on 13 November 1931 for £125,000 and immediately formed Bentley Motors (1931) Ltd."
- Posthumus, Cyril (1977) [1977]. "The End of an Era". The Story of Veteran & Vintage Cars. John Wood, illustrator. Feltham, Middlesex, UK: Hamlyn. pp. 112–123. ISBN 0-600-39155-8.
- Robson, Graham (1990). "Bentley 8-litre". The Worlds Most Powerful Cars. London: Quintet Publishing. pp. 24–27. ISBN 1-85076-254-6. "The Derby company was relieved when the trade depression killed off Bentley – and the 8-litre model was never revived by the new management."
- "1931 Bentley 8-Liter". Conceptcarz. Daniel Vaughan.
- "1931 Bentley 8 Litre Chassis No. YX5121 Engine No. YX5122 Registration no. GW 2926". VintageBentleys.org. 2006. Archived from the original on 18 July 2012. "This famous car will forever be associated with just two people: Mr. Forrest Lycett, the original owner, and Mr. L. C. McKenzie, the developer."
- "History By Chassis – List of all W. O. Bentleys with original chassis nos. 8 Litre". Houston, TX USA: VintageBentleys.Org. Archived from the original on 13 April 2009.
- "HISTORY OF MARQUES: BENTLEY – British". Sportscars.TV. 1966. Archived from the original on 6 August 2010. "There was nothing to complain about in the engine design, but unfortunately the very heavy 8-litre chassis was used and this resulted in a rather dull and slow car."
- "Lot 244: Bentley 4-Litre/8-Litre Le Mans-style Tourer". Motorbase. Hastings, UK: Classic Vehicles. "A double-drop chassis was adopted, closely based on that of the contemporary Bentley 8-Litre, and offered in two wheelbase lengths: 11' 2" and 11' 8", both of which were shorter than the shortest of the two 8-Litre chassis available."
