= 1927 24 Hours of Le Mans =

5th 24 Hours of Le Mans endurance race

Previous: 1926	Next: 1928
Index: Races | Winners

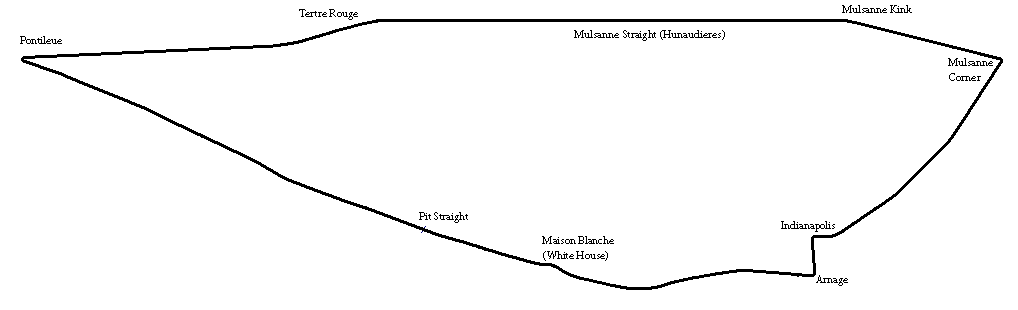
the Le Mans track in 1927

The 1927 24 Hours of Le Mans, the 5th Grand Prix of Endurance, was a motor race which took place at the Circuit de la Sarthe on 18 and 19 June 1927. The race was one of the most remarkable and dramatic pre-war Le Mans races. It is commonly remembered due to the infamous White House crash, a major accident that involved eight cars including all three of the widely tipped Bentley team's entries, and caused the retirement of two of them. The race was eventually won by the third which, although badly damaged, was able to be repaired by drivers Dudley Benjafield and Sammy Davis. It was Bentley's second victory in the endurance classic.

In a race missing many major manufacturers, the three Bentleys had been comfortably leading from the start, putting a lap on the rest on the field. The accident occurred about 9.40pm, as night was falling and a drizzle had started. A 2-litre Th. Schneider had spun at the White House curves blocking the road when the lead Bentley, unsighted, hit it at speed. Davis was able to extricate his damaged car and get back to the pits, resuming the race after a half-hour repair. The French Ariès of Jean Chassagne and Robert Laly, the only other large-engined car in the race, had meanwhile taken the lead. They held it through a very wet night and into the Sunday, until stopped with less than two hours to go by a broken distributor. Davis and Benjafield had pushed their mishandling car hard all the way to take a lauded victory, in the end by a considerable 20-lap margin.

== Regulations ==
This year the Automobile Club de l'Ouest (ACO) lifted the minimum production required from 10 to 30 cars. A new dispensation for 1100 to 1500cc was to let them have only three seats. Crucially this removed 60 kg of compulsory ballast from them.

Once again the ACO adjusted the Index target distances; although for the first time there was a reduction in target – in the smallest-engined cars. Example targets included the following:

Engine size	1926 Minimum laps	1927 Minimum laps	Required Average speed
3000cc	120	129	92.8 km/h (57.7 mph)
2000cc	113	118	84.9 km/h (52.8 mph)
1500cc	107	107	77.0 km/h (47.8 mph)
1100cc	99	94	67.6 km/h (42.0 mph)

Grand Garage Saint-Didier, the large Parisian car-dealership sponsoring the Index competition, boosted its prize-money to a substantial FF50000.

Concerned about the advent of specialised racing fuels with expensive high-octane ratings, the ACO now dictated that all cars had to use the same commercial-grade gasoline. This raised many complaints from the teams concerned about the effects on their highly tuned racing engines. The ACO provided the teams with 20-litre churns of Standard Oil's "Eco-Essence" gasoline. A chemist analysed the residual fuel of each car at the end of the event and confirmed that no fuel-modification had occurred.

== Entries ==
Across Europe political unease and high inflation were having an impact. The automotive industry was heavily affected with mergers, bankruptcies and other financial worries amongst competitor manufacturers. After 41 cars started the previous year only 25 arrived this year. Peugeot, Chenard-Walcker, OM and Lorraine-Dietrich (winners of the event for the previous two years) all stayed away, and Rolland-Pilain withdrew a few weeks before the race. It was brought home when Ariès was the only French company now in the big-engine end of the field. Of the 13 places reserved for the qualifiers from the Biennial Cup only six were re-taken. However, there were three new teams from the small French manufacturers Fasto, SCAP and Tracta.

Category	Entries	Classes
Large-sized engines	4 / 4	over 2-litre
Medium-sized engines	8 / 5	1.1 to 2-litre
Small-sized engines	16 / 13	up to 1.1-litre
Total entrants	28 / 22	

- Note: The first number is the number of entries, the second the number who started.

Thus, with a dearth of competition, Bentley were the pre-race favourites and they arrived with three cars. After a humiliating run of retirements since their victory in the 1924 event, W.O. Bentley decided to enter a strong team, despite the weakened opposition. Dudley Benjafield and Sammy Davis were again paired in the same 3-litre car, nicknamed "Old Number 7", which they had crashed just an hour from the finish in the 1926 race. Woolf Barnato's financial investment had meant over 1400 3-litre models had now been built and a second 3 litre was entered for the French Baron André d'Erlanger and George Duller. A new prototype was also entered. The 4½ litre, (later nicknamed Old Mother Gun), had a four-cylinder version of the new Straight-Six model put into the long-wheelbase 3-litre chassis. While the 3-litre engines were now capable of 88 bhp the new model put out 115 bhp. The car was entrusted to the works driver, 1924-winner, Frank Clement with Leslie Callingham as co-driver. The drivers made a point of practicing putting up their car-hoods and the team filmed their pit-stop routines to further improve them.

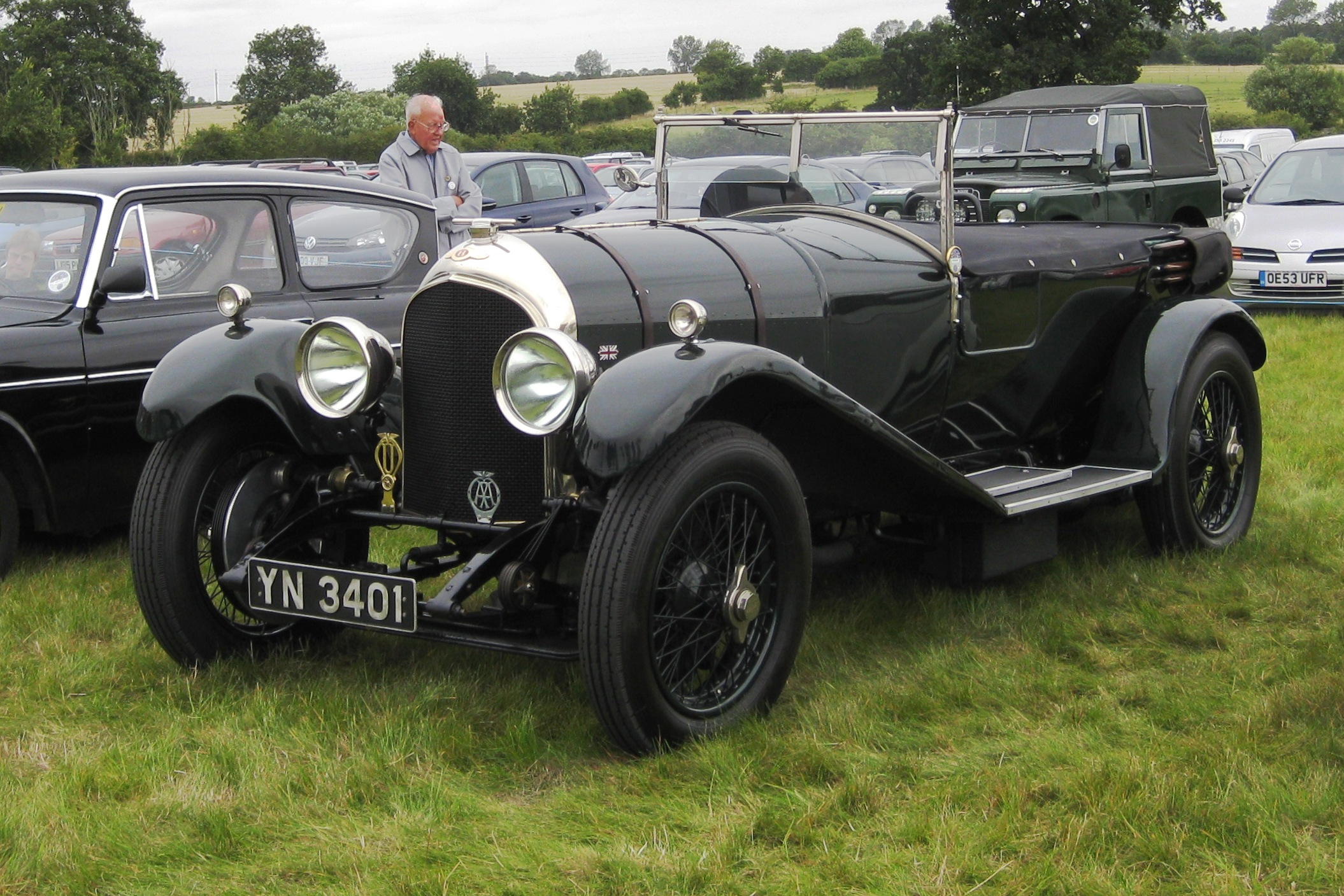
Bentley 3-litre Speed

Automobiles Ariès returned with its streamlined 3-litre "tank", making up a much-reduced large-engine field. Once again it was driven by the experienced pairing of Jean Chassagne and Robert Laly. The company also entered two 1100cc cars – a 2-seater CC2 and a new 4-seateer CC4, burdened with an extra 120 kg of ballast for the extra seats.

After a successful introduction the previous year, Th. Schneider had put out a "Le Mans" variant for sale in 1927 with a torpedo-style bodywork. Two of the new 2-litre cars were entered for the race. Fabrique Automobile de St Ouen, or Fasto, was a Parisian manufacturer formed in 1926. A lightened version of their standard vehicle, the Type A3 Sport, came to Le Mans for its competition debut. Running a 2-litre engine, three cars were entered.

The S.C.A.P. company had already been at Le Mans, as an engine manufacturer. This year it arrived with two cars of its own manufacture. The Type O was a 4-seater with the compact new 1.5-litre straight-8 engine. One was driven by Le Mans veterans Fernand Vallon (formerly driving for Corre La Licorne) and Lucien Desvaux (ex-Salmson and Chrysler) while the other had debutantes Albert Clément and Henri Guibert. This year S.A.R.A. also introduced a bigger model. The SP7 had a 6-cylinder 1.5-litre pushrod engine on a four-seat long-wheelbase convertible. The team also brought two of their standard 1100cc BDE cars, entered for the 1926-27 Biennial Cup.

Salmson brought three of their Grand Sport 2-seaters. Derived from their successful VAL-3 model, they had a double-overhead cam 1.1-litre engines. Virtually the same experienced works-team line-up returned with Georges Casse/André Rousseau, Jean Hasley/André de Victor. Only Lionel de Marmier had a new co-driver, running with Pierre Goutte. The 1100cc category made up over half the field. Along with Salmson, Ariès and SARA, there were multicar teams returning from E.H.P. (Établissements Henri Precloux) and Gendron.

A new team this year was Tracta. The company had only been founded in January, by engineers Jean-Albert Grégoire and Pierre Fenaille, bankrolled by Fenaille's wealthy entrepreneurial father. They brought two of their eye-catching, lowline Gephi models to Le Mans. Using a SCAP 1.1-litre engine the cars were unusual in being front-wheel drive and with a unique constant-velocity joint which they had patented. The in-line gearbox and final-drive gave it a long bonnet and low centre of gravity. The engineers both drove a car: Fenaille with his friend Etienne Boussod and Grégoire with Fenaille's chauffeur Roger Bourcier.

== Practice ==
Once again the public roads were closed on Friday night from 10pm to 6am to allow private practice. Bentley experimented with fitting more powerful Italian Memini carburettors but Benjafield's car caught fire with them at Mulsanne corner. Fortunately, the damage was not severe and the engine was converted back for the race.

On the Friday night, Le Mans had its third fatality. Marcel Michelot, commercial director of Gendron & Cie, took his car out for some practice laps. Getting disorientated in thick fog between Mulsanne and Arnage corners, he went off the road at speed and ploughed into a tree. Marcel Gendron, mourning his friend and co-founder, withdrew the other team car he was due to race himself from the race.

On Saturday morning, the Tracta team-drivers were all injured in a bad road accident en route to the track. Boussod misjudged a corner near Arnage and the car fell off the road into a ditch at 60 mph. While Boussod was badly shaken and Grégoire was bruised, the other two were in much worse shape: Bourcier had a crushed leg and Fenaille had a severe head injury, ending up in a coma. They were taken to hospital but Grégoire contrived to escape and made his way back to the track, determined to race for the sake of his new company. Appealing to race director Charles Faroux he put out a plea over the public address asking for a volunteer co-driver. Lucien Lemesle, a local mechanic answered and Grégoire had just enough time to explain the peculiarities of his unusual car before the start of the race.

== Race ==
=== Start ===
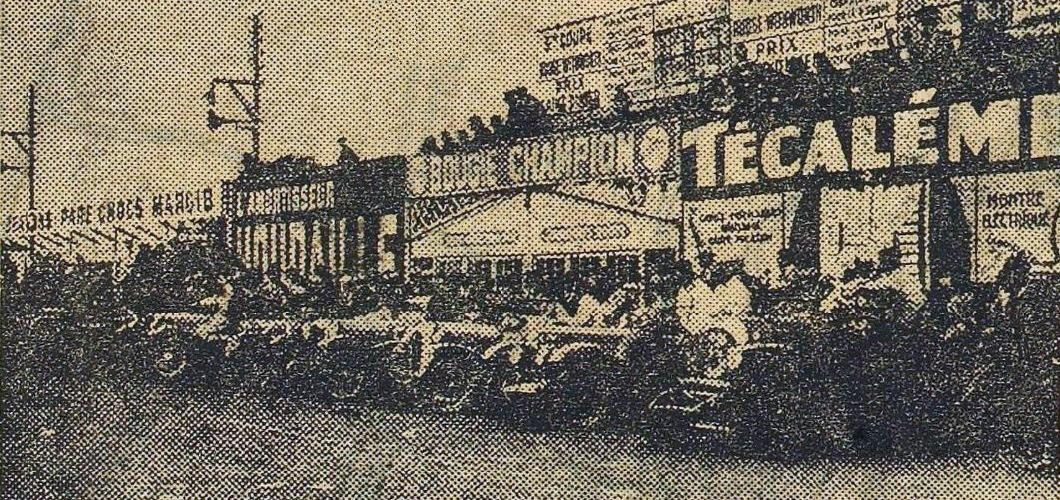
Lined up for the start

After a lap of honour from the 1926-race winning Lorraine-Dietrich, the cars were once again flagged away by Émile Coquille, co-organiser and representative of the sponsor Rudge-Whitworth. Once again, the Bentley drivers' hood-raising practice proved itself as their three cars were first away with Clement leading Benjafield and d'Erlanger away in a Bentley 1-2-3 in the opening laps. The speed of the 4 ½ litre was underlined by Clement when he broke the circuit record in only the second lap of the race. Over the following few laps he whittled this down still further, to only 8 minutes 46 seconds for the 10.7 mile (17.3 km) circuit. This early-race performance was yet more remarkable as, at the time, the cars were required to run with their hoods erected for the first twenty laps (about three hours) of the race.

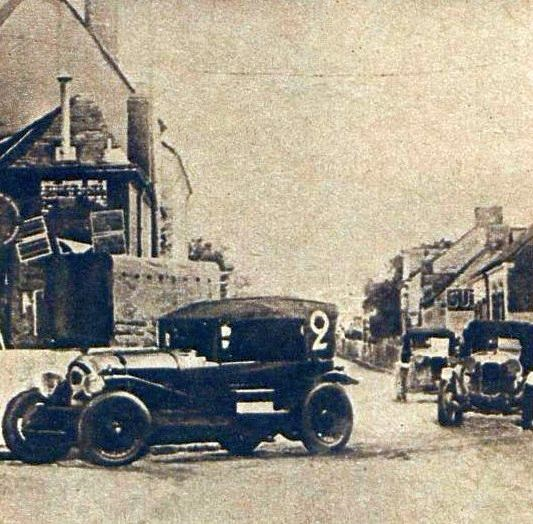
Start of the race: d'Erlanger's Bentley, hood up, at Pontlieue hairpin

After the first hour, the three Bentleys were well ahead of Laly's Ariès and the three Salmsons of de Victor, de Marmier and Casse running in formation. Then came the Fasto of Brosselin and Chantrel's Schneider rounding out the top-ten. Clement had lapped the whole field after only twelve laps (the Bentley team had calculated it would take thirteen laps) and made his first pit-stop and driver-change at 7pm with that comfortable lead. The other two Bentleys made theirs a quarter-hour later after themselves putting the fourth-placed Ariès a lap behind. Unlike the well-drilled Bentley team, Laly took six minutes to put his hood down and away. De Marmier's Salmson could not be restarted after the first pit-stops and was later disqualified for being push-started. It had been a routine race until about 9.40pm, in the late twilight.

=== The Maison Blanche ("White House") crash ===
Pierre Tabourin's Th. Schneider had been delayed early in the race. Pushing to make up time, he was put off-line by an overtaking car and spun at the tricky Maison Blanche ("White House") curves approaching the pit straight. The car hit the barriers and ended up broadside in the middle of the road, out of sight of the following drivers in the growing darkness. The S-sequence of curves was narrow and fast with the view of the exit obscured by the distinctive white farmhouse that gave the section its name.

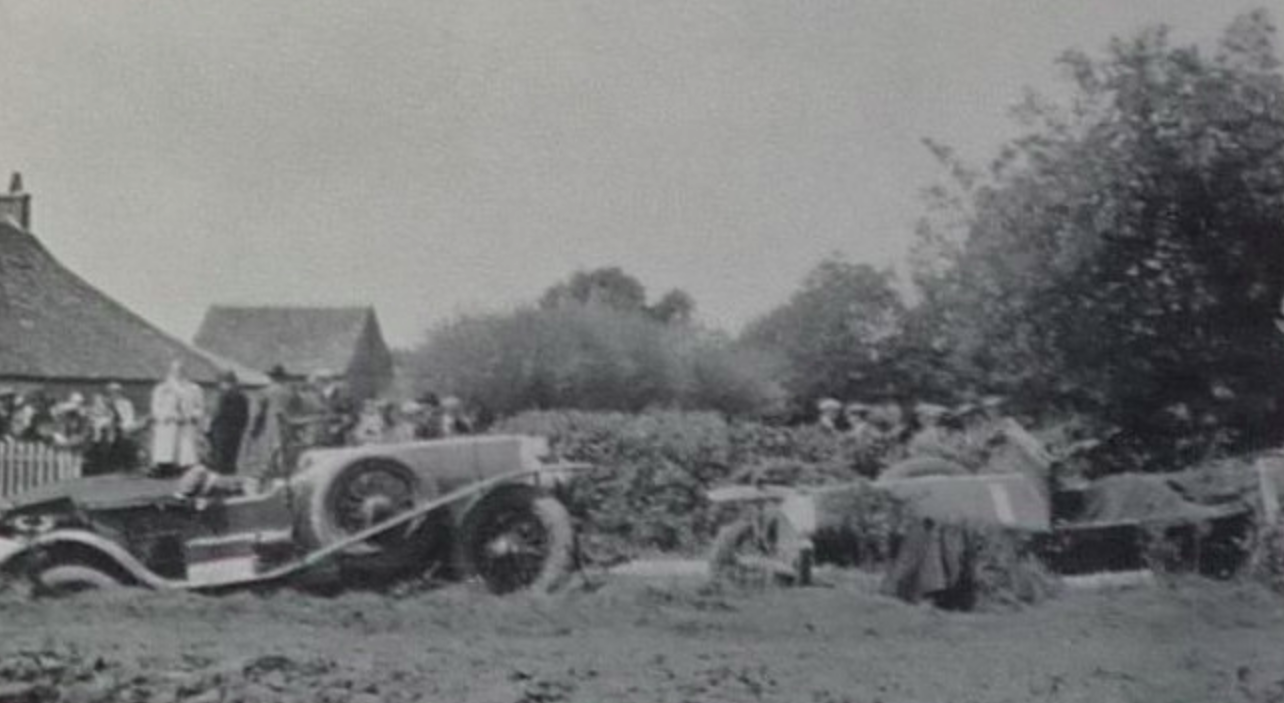
Crash scene the next day. Entry #1 at right is Clement and Callingham's Bentley. Left may be #2, d'Erlanger and Duller's

The first to arrive was the leader, Callingham, at high speed. Trying to avoid the car he slid off to the right into the roadside ditch at over 70 mph (110 kp/h), hitting with such force that the driver was thrown out into the middle of the road. George Duller arrived next, and seeing the danger, jumped over his steering wheel out of the car just before the impact. It slammed into Callingham's car, which rolled and left his on top of it. Subsequently, the other Schneider, one of the small Ariès and a SARA also suffered damage in the pile-up. Duller had staggered off dazed to warn other drivers, before realising he was on the other side of the roadside hedge and couldn't be seen.

When Sammy Davis arrived on the scene he was alerted that all was not as it should be. Even tens of metres back up the road its surface was strewn with gravel and debris, and so he entered the corner slower than would normally have been the case. Although already decelerating, he came around the corner to find the road completely blocked and insufficient time to brake to a halt. Rather than hitting the stationary cars head-on Davis put the big Bentley into a slide and hit them sideways, striking first with the right-hand front wing. Behind him, Thelussen's Fasto was also able to slow and only struck a glancing blow. Amazingly despite all the carnage, the only major injury was to the Schneider driver Tabourin, who suffered a broken arm and ribs.

After finding his teammates and the other drivers had all survived, Davis was able to untangle his Bentley from the wreckage, squeeze through and limp onto the pits. There the team assessed the damage. The chassis and front suspension were bent, the fenders badly mangled and the right headlamp broken. Although he was the only one permitted to work on repairing his car (and only using tools carried on the car), with the advice of his mechanics and a lot of tape and string he was able to get the car mobile again. Half an hour later he drove out to complete six cautious laps before handing over to co-driver Benjafield on schedule. The steering pulled to the right and the braking was not synchronised between the wheels. The SARA was also able to continue after repairs, but ran into mechanical troubles over the night and was disqualified at half-time just three laps short of its 12-hour target distance. The second Th. Schneider ran only six further laps when it was withdrawn by the team following Tabourin's injuries.

=== Night ===
With the three leading cars taken out in the accident, the 3-litre Ariès, now driven by veteran Jean Chassagne, assumed the lead. Rain settled in during the night as the Frenchmen built a margin, with the Bentley gamely pursuing. However, as Benjafield got more used to the car he was able to pick up his pace and even close in on the Ariès. Just after midnight he was back on the lead lap until he had to stop to re-attach the useless right headlamp again. Affixing a strong flashlight to the windscreen upright he soldiered on. Davis also had to stop later to do more work on the right-hand fenders. Running third through the night was the Fasto of Brosselin/Thelussen (also repaired after the accident) followed by the two remaining Salmsons and the other two Fastos.

At the six-hour mark, the two smaller Ariès were both disqualified for insufficient distance. Gabriel had repaired its damage from the crash earlier, but both had been delayed by engine issues. They were just finishing repairs when they were declared hors course The rain became a heavy thunderstorm and many drivers chose to pull over to wait out the worst of the squalls, which eventually abated around 5.30am as dawn arrived.

=== Morning ===
Through the morning Chassagne and Laly were able to maintain their 4-lap lead. The morning was hard on the new Fasto team. First their leading car, that had survived the White House crash and been running as high as third through the night was put out with magneto failure just after dawn. The second car only managed three further laps before a valve spring broke and their final car had a similar failure at midday.

But soon after midday the Ariès' pit-stop had a fault with its ignition system. Twenty-five minutes were lost and by the time they were going again the Bentley was only four minutes (half-a lap) behind. Knowing they were facing a crippled car, Laly and Chassagne put in fast laps to rebuild his lead.

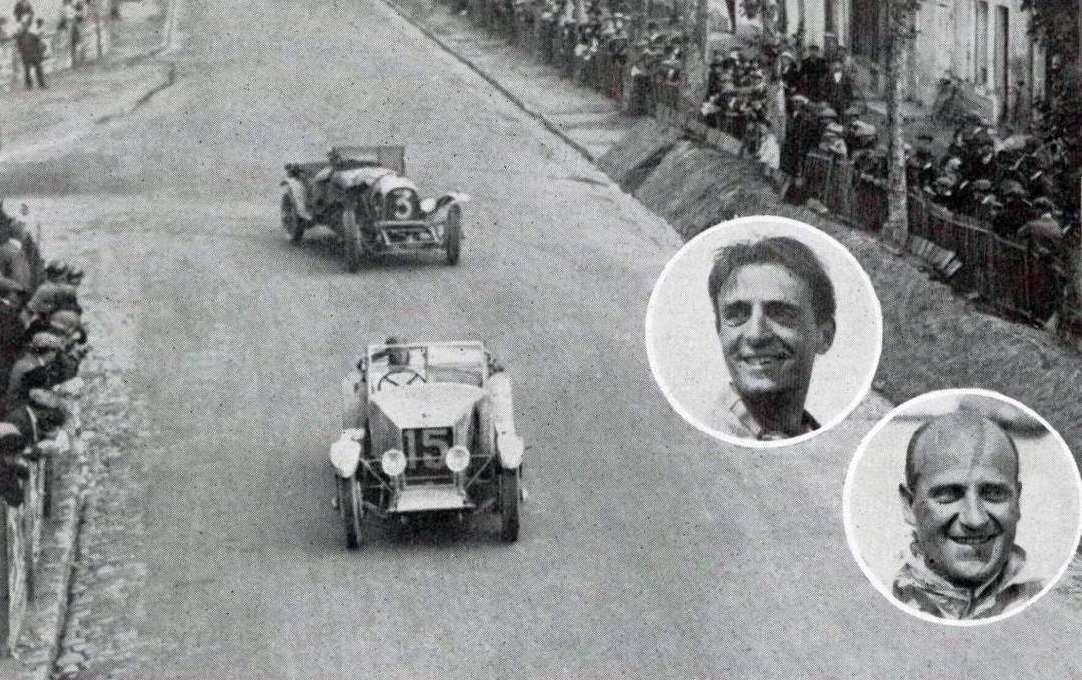
SCAP #15 coming out of Pontlieue, leading the winning Bentley of Davis (L) & Benjafield (R)

=== Finish and post-race ===
Then at 2.30pm, after its last pit stop and on its 123rd lap the Ariès' distributor system failed completely, stranding Chassagne out on the circuit. Davis and Benjafield immediately eased off to nursing the injured Bentley home. With a quarter-hour to go, Benjafield pulled in to swap with Davis to give him the honour of taking the finishing-flag. They finished 20 laps ahead of the two Salmsons of de Victor/Hasley and Casse/Rousseau. What looked on paper as a dominant victory had been anything but. There were only eight finishers in this race of attrition.

Without Davis' efforts, Salmson could have celebrated a most unlikely overall victory for the little 1.1-litre cars, which would easily be the smallest-engined cars to have won Le Mans. As it was they did secure the big prizes, with Casse and Rousseau winning the Biennial Cup, and their teammates the Index of Performance for the interim-year of the next Biennial Cup. Fourth was the SCAP of Desvaux and Vallon, passing their target by six laps while their teammates, although running at the end, missed their target by six laps and were not classified.

Seventh and last classified finisher was the Tracta of Jean-Albert Grégoire, with arguably the most heroic drive of the race, having met its target distance by four laps. Despite being battered, bruised and driving with a bandage wrapped around his head under his helmet, Grégoire had driven fifteen of the first twenty hours. His volunteer co-driver, Lemesle, was not confident driving in the heavy overnight rain. Having already met the target distance by midday, he decided to stop the car and not risk any further danger. Not parking in the pits, where the public might see the car and conclude it was unreliable, the clerk of the course found him asleep beside his car parked among the trees between Mulsanne and Arnage. He thereafter continued to circulate periodically, although he knew the laps would not be counted as their average speed was too slow. His business partner, Pierre Fenaille, was in his coma for a fortnight and took two years to recover from partial paralysis and the severe head trauma.

After this race's disappointment, the Fasto team had a complete change of fortune when all finished at the ensuing Spa 24-Hours including fourth overall for Thelussin/Brosseau. After a further class-victory at the Montlhéry 24-Hour race the team promptly retired from racing after just the three events.

Despite the slower pace and shorter distance set than the 1926 Le Mans, the dramatic events surrounding the Maison Blanche crash meant that the race gained much wider press coverage than had been the case in previous years. In particular, Davis's honourable and heroic actions in searching the wreckage for his compatriots and rivals, before continuing the race in the teeth of adversity, gained him high praise. That such actions had been taken by a group of young men who had previously been much better known for their lavish parties and fast-living lifestyles only added to the popular appeal. Their determination seemed to embody much of what the British regarded as best in their national character, and on their return to the UK the team were greeted as national heroes. The Autocar magazine fuelled the Bentley team's reputation by hosting a grand post-race party at the Savoy Hotel in central London. Old Number 7, which had come so close to victory in 1926 and still coated with mud and damaged from the victory this year, was guest of honour.

Clement's early-race efforts were also rewarded with two FF1000 prizes, from the French Automobile Club du Nord and Morris- Léon Bollée, for setting the fastest lap. Both Benjafield and Davis remained significant figures in British motorsport over the following few decades. Benjafield was a founder of the British Racing Drivers' Club, and Davis as sports editor of The Autocar and one of the founders of the Veteran Car Club.

== Official results ==
=== Finishers ===
Results taken from Quentin Spurring's book, officially licensed by the ACO. Although there were no official engine classes, the highest finishers in unofficial categories aligned with the Index targets are in Bold text.

Pos	Class ***	No.	Team	Drivers	Chassis	Engine	Tyre	Target distance*	Laps	Index score
1	**3.0**	**3**	**(United Kingdom) Bentley Motors Limited**	**(United Kingdom) Dudley Benjafield** **(United Kingdom) Sammy Davis**	Bentley 3 Litre Speed	Bentley 3.0 S4	D	129	137	1.062
2	**1.1**	**25**	**(France) Société des Moteurs Salmson**	**(France) André de Victor** **(France) Jean Hasley**	Salmson Grand Sport	Salmson 1094cc S4	D	94	117	1.245
3	1.1	23	(France) Société des Moteurs Salmson	(France) Georges Casse (France) André Rousseau	Salmson Grand Sport	Salmson 1094cc S4	D	94 [B]	115	1.239
4	**1.5**	**15**	**(France) Société de Construction**; **Automobile Parisienne**	**(France) Lucien Desvaux** **(France) Fernand Vallon**	S.C.A.P. Type O	S.C.A.P. 1492cc S8	D	105	111	1.057
5	1.1	26	(France) Établissements Henri Précloux	(France) Guy Bouriat (France) Pierre Bussienne	E.H.P. Type DS	CIME 1094cc S4	D	94 [B]	109	1.160
6	1.1	21	(France) Société des Applications à Refroidissements par Air	(France) André Marandet (France) Gonzaque Lécureul	SARA BDE	SARA 1099cc S4	E	94 [B]	107	1.139
7	1.1	20	(France) Société Anonyme des Automobiles Tracta	(France) Jean-Albert Grégoire (France) Lucien Lemesle	Tracta Gephi	S.C.A.P. 1099cc S4	D	94	98	1.043
N/C **	1.5	16	(France) Société de Construction; Automobile Parisienne	(France) Albert Clément (France) Henri Guilbert	S.C.A.P. Type O	S.C.A.P. 1492cc S8	D	105	99	-

=== Did Not Finish ===
Pos	Class ***	No	Team	Drivers	Chassis	Engine	Tyre	Target distance*	Laps	Reason
DNF	2.0	4	(France) Société des Automobiles Ariès	(France) Robert Laly (France) Jean Chassagne	Ariès Type S GP2 Surbaisée	Ariès 3.0L S4	D	129	122	Engine (23 hr)
DNF	2.0	8	(France) Fabrique Automobile de St Ouen	(France) Raymond Leroy (France) Pierre Mesnel	Fasto A3 Sport	Fasto 1996cc S4	D	117	96	Engine (20 hr)
DNF	2.0	10	(France) Fabrique Automobile de St Ouen	(France) Michel Doré (France) Roger Hellot	Fasto A3 Sport	Fasto 1996cc S4	D	117	75	Engine (morning)
DNF	2.0	9	(France) Fabrique Automobile de St Ouen	(France) Frédéric Thelusson (France) . Brosseau	Fasto A3 Sport	Fasto 1996cc S4	D	117	72	Electrics (dawn)
DSQ	1.5	14	(France) Société des Applications à Refroidissements par Air	(France) Gaston Mottet (France) Emile Maret	SARA SP7	SARA 1498cc S6	E	106	50	Insufficient distance (12 hr)
DNF	1.1	22	(France) Société des Applications à Refroidissements par Air	(France) Henri Armand (France) Gaston Duval	SARA BDE	SARA 1099cc S4	E	94 [B]	42	Transmission (10 hr)
DNF	5.0	1	(United Kingdom) Bentley Motors Limited	(United Kingdom) Frank Clement (United Kingdom) Leslie Callingham	Bentley 4½ Litre	Bentley 4.4L S4	D	132	35	Accident (6 hr)
DNF	3.0	2	(United Kingdom) Bentley Motors Limited	(France) Baron André d'Erlanger (United Kingdom) George Duller	Bentley 3 Litre Speed	Bentley 3.0 S4	D	129	34	Accident (6 hr)
DNF	2.0	12	(France) Automobiles Th. Schneider SA	(France) Jacques Chanterelle (France) René Schiltz	Th. Schneider 25 SP 'Le Mans'	Th. Schneider 1954cc S4	D	117	34	Withdrawn (7 hr)
DNF	2.0	11	(France) Automobiles Th. Schneider SA	(France) Robert Poirier (France) Pierre Tabourin	Th. Schneider 25 SP 'Le Mans'	Th. Schneider 1954cc S4	D	117 [B]	26	Accident (6 hr)
DSQ	1.1	29	(France) Société des Automobiles Ariès	(France) Fernand Gabriel (France) Louis Paris	Ariès CC2 Super	Ariès 1088cc S4	D	94	23	Insufficient distance (6 hr)
DSQ	1.1	24	(France) Société des Moteurs Salmson	(France) Lionel de Marmier (France) Pierre Goutte	Salmson Grand Sport	Salmson 1094cc S4	D	94	21	Push-started (4 hr)
DSQ	1.1	28	(France) Société des Automobiles Ariès	(France) Arthur Duray (France) Roger Delano	Ariès CC4	Ariès 1088cc S4	D	94 [B]	16	Insufficient distance (6 hr)
DNF	1.1	27	(France) Établissements Henri Précloux	(France) Henri de Costier (France) Hilaire Gaignard	E.H.P. Type DS	CIME 1094cc S4	D	94	8	Radiator (2 hr)
Sources:

- Note *: [B]= car also entered in the 1926-7 Biennial Cup.
- Note **: Not Classified because did not meet target distance.
- Note ***: There were no official class divisions for this race. These are unofficial categories (used in subsequent years) related to the Index targets.

=== Did Not Start ===
Pos	Class	No	Team	Drivers	Chassis	Engine	Reason
DNS	1.1	17	(France) Automobiles Gendron & Cie	(France) Marcel Michelot (France) Lucien Bossoutrot	GM GC3 Sport	CIME 1099cc S4	Fatal Accident in practice
DNS	1.1	18	(France) Automobiles Gendron & Cie	(France) Marcel Gendron	GM GC3 Sport	CIME 1099cc S4	Withdrawn
DNS	1.1	19	(France) SA des Automobiles Tracta	(France) Pierre Fenaille (France) Etienne Boussod	Tracta Gephi	S.C.A.P. 1099cc S4	Accident en route to circuit
DNA	2.0	5	(France) Établissements Automobiles; Rolland et Pilain SA		Rolland-Pilain C23	Rolland-Pilain 1997cc S4	Did not arrive
DNA	2.0	6	(France) Établissements Automobiles; Rolland et Pilain SA		Rolland-Pilain C23	Rolland-Pilain 1997cc S4	Did not arrive
DNA	2.0	7	(France) Établissements Automobiles; Rolland et Pilain SA		Rolland-Pilain C23	Rolland-Pilain 1997cc S4	Did not arrive

=== 1926-27 Coupe Biennale Rudge-Whitworth ===
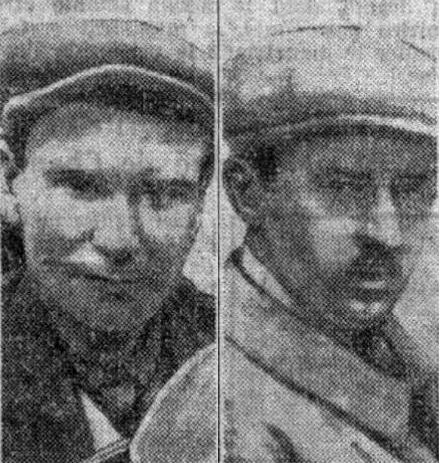
Casse (L) & Rousseau (R), winners of the 1926-7 Biennial Cup

Pos	Class	No.	Team	Drivers	Chassis	1927 Index Result
1	1.1	23	(France) Société des Moteurs Salmson	(France) Georges Casse (France) André Rousseau	Salmson Grand Sport	1.239
2	1.1	26	(France) Établissements Henri Précloux	(France) Guy Bouriat (France) Pierre Bussienne	E.H.P. Type DS	1.160
3	1.1	21	(France) Société des Applications à Refroidissements par Air	(France) André Marandet (France) Gonzaque Lécureul	SARA BDE	1.139

=== 1927 Index of Performance (Prix Saint-Didier) ===
Pos	Class	No.	Team	Drivers	Chassis	Index Result
1	1.1	25	(France) Société des Moteurs Salmson	(France) André de Victor (France) Jean Hasley	Salmson Grand Sport	1.245
2	1.1	23	(France) Société des Moteurs Salmson	(France) Georges Casse (France) André Rousseau	Salmson Grand Sport	1.239
3	1.1	26	(France) Établissements Henri Précloux	(France) Guy Bouriat (France) Pierre Bussienne	E.H.P. Type DS	1.160
4	1.1	21	(France) Société des Applications à Refroidissements par Air	(France) André Marandet (France) Gonzaque Lécureul	SARA BDE	1.139
5	3.0	3	(United Kingdom) Bentley Motors Limited	(United Kingdom) Dudley Benjafield (United Kingdom) Sammy Davis	Bentley 3 Litre Speed	1.062
6	1.5	15	(France) Société des Construction; Automobile Parisienne	(France) Lucien Desvaux (France) Fernand Vallon	S.C.A.P. Type O	1.057
7	1.1	20	(France) SA des Automobiles Tracta	(France) Jean-Albert Grégoire (France) Lucien Lemesle	Tracta Gephi	1.043

=== Highest Finisher in Class ===
Class	Winning car	Winning drivers
5 to 8-litre	no entrants	
3 to 5-litre	no finishers	
2 to 3-litre	#3 Bentley 3 Litre Speed	Benjafield / Davis
1500 to 2000cc	no finishers	
1100 to 1500cc	#15 SCAP Type O	Desvaux / Vallon
750 to 1100cc	#25 Salmson Grand Sport	de Victor / Hasley *

- Note *: setting a new class distance record.
- There were no official class divisions for this race and these are the highest finishers in unofficial categories (used in subsequent years) related to the Index targets.

=== Statistics ===
- Fastest Lap – F. Clement, #1 Bentley 4½ Litre Speed – 8:46secs; 118.14 km/h (73.41 mph)
- Longest Distance – 2,369.81 km (1,472.53 mi)
- Average Speed on Longest Distance – 98.74 km/h (61.35 mph)
