= Imperial Cup =

Hurdle horse race in Britain

Imperial Cup Handicap Hurdle
2026
Mondo Man	Wreckless Eric	We're Red And Blue

Previous years
2025
Go Dante	Wreckless Eric	Afadil
2024
Go Dante	Faivoir	Jipcot
2023
Iceo	Knickerbockerglory	Playful Saint
2022
Surprise Package	Lively Citizen	Hacker Des Places
2021
Langer Dan	Miss Heritage	Mack The Man

2020-2011
2019
Malaya	Monsieur Lecoq	Call Me Lord
2018
Mr Antolini	Call Me Lord	Whatswrongwithyou
2017
London Prize	Fixe Le Kap	Darebin
2016
Flying Angel	Solstice Star	Spice Fair
2015
Ebony Express	Rayvin Black	Gassin Golf
2014
Baltimore Rock	Gassin Golf	Vibrato Valtat
2013
First Avenue	Tanerko Emery	Kazlian
2012
Paintball	Nampour	Sire De Grugy
2011
Alarazi	Via Galilei	Pateese

2010-2001
2010
Qaspal	Oldrik	Pepe Simo
2009
Dave's Dream	Seven Is My Number	Prince Taime
2008
Ashkazar	Fredensborg	Albinus
2007
Gaspara	Flying Falcon	Magnesium
2006
Victram	Dusky Warbler	Verasi
2005
Medison	Fenix	Monte Cinto
2004
Scorned	Bold Bishop	Fenix
2003
Korelo	Newhall	Lawz
2002
Polar Red	Impek	Scots Grey
2001
Ibal	Valiramix	Rooster Booster

2000-1991
2000
Magic Combination	The Gatherer	Brigade Charge
1999
Regency Rake	Coulthard	Dr Jazz
1998
Blowing Wind	Sadler's Realm	Nahrawali
1997
Carlito Brigante	Doctoor	Express Gift
1996
Amancio	Silver Groom	Chief's Song
1995
Collier Bay	Star Player	Kingsfold Pet
1994
Precious Boy	Riva	Leotard
1993
Olympian	Gymcrak Stardom	Spinning
1992
King Credo	Rodeo Star	Spinning
1991
Precious Boy	Ketti	Badrakhani

1990-1988
1990
Moody Man	Penny Forum	Joyful Noise
1989
Travel Mystery	Little Toro	Afaristoun
1988
Sprowston Boy	Jimbalou	Capa

The Imperial Cup is a National Hunt hurdle race in Great Britain which is open to horses aged four years or older. It is run at Sandown Park over a distance of about 2 miles (1 mile, 7 furlongs and 216 yards, or 3,215 metres), and during its running there are eight hurdles to be jumped. It is a handicap race, and it is scheduled to take place each year in March.

The Imperial Cup was first run in 1907, and in its early years it was considered to be the most important hurdle race of the season. A notable winner during this period was Trespasser, who recorded three successive victories in the race from 1920 to 1922. It continued to be the most prestigious hurdling event until the launch of the Champion Hurdle in 1927.

The race is run on a Saturday in March, three days before the start of the Cheltenham Festival. The sponsors of the Imperial Cup have offered a financial bonus prize to the owner of the winning horse since 1992, awarded if the horse goes on to win any race at the following week's Festival. Winners of this bonus have included Olympian (who won the Coral Cup at Cheltenham), Blowing Wind (County Hurdle) and Gaspara (Fred Winter Hurdle). . The 2016 running was unsponsored and no bonus was offered. The bonus returned in 2017 when new sponsors Matchbook offered a £50,000 prize, which they increased to £100,000 for the 2018 running. The race was upgraded from Listed to Grade Three status by the British Horseracing Board from its 2014 running. It was re-classified as a Premier Handicap from the 2023 running when Grade 3 status was renamed by the British Horseracing Authority. Since 2024 it has been run as a Class 2 handicap.

In 2025 the owners of Sandown Park, The Jockey Club, re-instated the bonus offering £100,000 to any horse who could win this prestigious race, then go on to win at The Cheltenham Festival.

== Records ==
Most successful horse since 1947 (2 wins):

- Secret Service - 1949, 1950
- High Point – 1952, 1953
- Precious Boy – 1991, 1994
- Go Dante - 2024, 2025

Leading jockey since 1947 (5 wins):

- Tony McCoy – Blowing Wind (1998), Polar Red (2002), Korelo (2003), Gaspara (2007), Qaspal (2010)

Leading trainer since 1947 (6 wins):

- Martin Pipe – Travel Mystery (1989), Olympian (1993), Blowing Wind (1998), Polar Red (2002), Korelo (2003), Medison (2005)

== Winners ==
- Weights given in stones and pounds.

Year	Winner	Age	Weight	Jockey	Trainer
1907	Carnegie	6	11–04	James O'Brien	J Westlake
1908	Perseus II	8	11–11	Mr Stuart Bell	James Bell
1909	Abandoned due to snow
1910	Black Plum	6	11–05	Frank Mason	P Whitaker
1911	Bendy Tree	4	11–04	James Hare	J H Batho
1912	Meridian	5	11–05	Bill Escott	Harry Escott
1913	Rathlea	8	10–12	Ernest Piggott	E Martin
1914	Vermouth	4	10–10	George Duller	James Bell
	no race 1915–19
1920	Trespasser	4	12–00	George Duller	James Bell
1921	Trespasser	5	12–07	George Duller	James Bell
1922	Trespasser	6	12–07	George Duller	James Bell
1923	North Waltham	6	12–04	Georges Parfrement	P Whitaker
1924	Noce d'Argent	4	11–02	Frank Wootten	Stanley Wootten
1925	Scotch Pearl	4	10–07	Fred Rees	Walter Nightingall
1926	Peeping Tom	4	10–07	George Duller	James Bell
1927	Zeno	4	10–12	Billy Speck	Walter Nightingall
1928	Royal Falcon	5	11–06	Ted Leader	F Leech
1929	Hercules	6	11–05	George Duller	James Bell
1930	Rubicon II	4	11–03	George Duller	P Donaghue
1931	Residue	7	12–03	Georges Pellerin	Owen Anthony
1932	Last Of The Dandies	5	11–04	Bill Hollick	W Payne
1933	Flaming	6	11–04	George Bostwick	Ivor Anthony
1934	Lion Courage	6	10–07	Gerry Wilson	W R Read
1935	Negro	6	11–06	Billy Speck	George Wilson
1936	Negro	7	11–03	Staff Ingham	George Wilson
1937	Le Maestro	6	11–00	Jack Fawkus	Gwyn Evans
1938	Bimco	5	10–12	Ernest Vinall	H Turner
1939	Mange Tout	5	11–08	Gerry Wilson	George Duller
	no race 1940–46
1947	Tant Pis	5	09-10	Frenchie Nicholson	J Goldsmith
1948	Anglesey	6	11-08	Johnnie Gilbert	Staff Ingham
1949	Secret Service	6	11–11	Johnnie Gilbert	Fulke Walwyn
1950	Secret Service	7	11–10	Tommy Cusack	Fulke Walwyn
1951	Master Bidar	6	10–11	Rene Emery	Ron Smyth
1952	High Point	6	10-04	Harry Sprague	Ginger Dennistoun
1953	High Point	7	10-07	Harry Sprague	Ginger Dennistoun
1954	The Pills	6	10-05	Jack Dowdeswell	P Rice-Stringer
1955	Bon Mot II	6	10–11	Michael Haynes	Stanley Wootton
1956	Peggy Jones	6	10–10	Alan Oughton	S Palmer
1957	Camugliano	7	10–10	Rene Emery	H T Smith
1958	Flaming East	9	10-05	John Lawrence (Note: amateur jockey)	Ricky Vallance
1959	Langton Heath	5	10-09	Raymond Martin	Tom Griffiths
1960	Farmer's Boy	7	11-07	David Nicholson	W Stephenson
1961	Fidus Achates	6	10-04	Clive Chapman	M James
1962	Irish Imp	5	10–12	Geordie Ramshaw	Ron Smyth
1963	Antiar	5	11-02	David Mould	Peter Cazalet
1964	Invader	6	11-04	Buck Jones	Syd Dale
1965	Kildavin	7	10-07	Jeff King	John Sutcliffe, jnr
1966	Royal Sanction	7	10-01	Richard Pitman	Fred Winter
1967	Sir Thopas	6	11-08	Johnny Haine	Bob Turnell
1968	Persian Empire	5	11-04	Brough Scott	Colin Davies
1969	Abandoned because of waterlogged state of course
1970	Solomon II	6	11-01	Bob Davies	David Barons
1971	Churchwood	7	11-03	Doug Barrott	M Goswell
1972	Spy Net	5	10-00	Geoff Lawson	Syd Dale
1973	Lanzarote	5	12-04	Richard Pitman	Fred Winter
1974	Flash Imp	5	10-09	Jeff King	Ron Smyth
1975	Abandoned because of waterlogged state of course
1976	Nougat	6	10-06	Gerry Enright	Josh Gifford
1977	Acquaint	6	11-02	Nicky Henderson	Fred Winter
1978	Winter Melody	7	11-03	Bill Smith	Jack Hanson
1979	Flying Diplomat	3	10-06	Tim Thomson Jones	A Smith
1980	Prayukta	5	11-00	John Francome	Fred Winter
1981	Ekbalco	5	11-03	David Goulding	Roger Fisher
1982	Holemoor Star	5	11-07	Martin O'Halloran	Miss S. Morris
1983	Desert Hero	9	09-08	Robert Chapman	Fulke Walwyn
1984	Dalbury	6	09-12	Peter Corrigan	Peter Haynes
1985	Floyd	5	10-03	Colin Brown	David Elsworth
1986	Insular	6	09-10	Eamon Murphy	Ian Balding
1987	Inlander	6	10-03	Steve Smith Eccles	Reg Akehurst
1988	Sprowston Boy	5	10–11	Seamus McCrystal	Paul Kelleway
1989	Travel Mystery	6	10-00	Peter Scudamore	Martin Pipe
1990	Moody Man	5	10–13	Peter Hobbs	Philip Hobbs
1991	Precious Boy	5	10-06	Lorcan Wyer	Mike O'Neill
1992	King Credo	7	10-04	Adrian Maguire	Steve Woodman
1993	Olympian	6	10-00	Peter Scudamore	Martin Pipe
1994	Precious Boy	8	11-07	Lorcan Wyer	Michael Meagher
1995	Collier Bay	5	10-02	Tom Grantham	Jim Old
1996	Amancio	5	10-08	Mick Fitzgerald	Guy Harwood
1997	Carlito Brigante	5	10-00	Jamie Osborne	Paul Webber
1998	Blowing Wind	5	11–10	Tony McCoy	Martin Pipe
1999	Regency Rake	7	10-07	Adrian Maguire	Arthur Moore
2000	Magic Combination	7	10-00	David Casey	Barney Curley
2001	Ibal	5	09-09	Ben Hitchcott	Dina Smith
2002	Polar Red	5	11-01	Tony McCoy	Martin Pipe
2003	Korelo	5	11-06	Tony McCoy	Martin Pipe
2004	Scorned	9	10-03	Barry Fenton	Andrew Balding
2005	Medison	5	10-01	Timmy Murphy	Martin Pipe
2006	Victram	6	09-12	Andrew Lynch	Adrian McGuinness
2007	Gaspara	4	10-05	Tony McCoy	David Pipe
2008	Ashkazar	4	10–12	Timmy Murphy	David Pipe
2009	Dave's Dream	6	10–13	Barry Geraghty	Nicky Henderson
2010	Qaspal	6	10-03	Tony McCoy	Philip Hobbs
2011	Alarazi	7	10-03	Dominic Elsworth	Lucy Wadham
2012	Paintball	5	10-07	Noel Fehily	Charlie Longsdon
2013	First Avenue	8	10-05	Nathan Adams	Laura Mongan
2014	Baltimore Rock	5	10–12	Tom Scudamore	David Pipe
2015	Ebony Express	6	10-07	Will Kennedy	Dr Richard Newland
2016	Flying Angel	5	10-07	Ryan Hatch	Nigel Twiston-Davies
2017	London Prize	6	11-02	Tom O'Brien	Ian Williams
2018	Mr Antolini	8	10-01	Jamie Bargary	Nigel Twiston-Davies
2019	Malaya	5	10-02	Harry Cobden	Paul Nicholls
2020	Abandoned because of waterlogged state of course
2021	Langer Dan	5	10-10	Harry Skelton	Dan Skelton
2022	Surprise Package	5	11-01	James Bowen	Peter Fahey
2023	Iceo	5	11-03	Harry Cobden	Paul Nicholls
2024	Go Dante	8	11-04	Sean Bowen	Olly Murphy
2025	Go Dante	9	10-08	Sean Bowen	Olly Murphy
2026	Mondo Man	5	10-12	Caolin Quinn	Gary & Josh Moore

== See also ==
- Horse racing in Great Britain
- List of British National Hunt races
