= Woolf Barnato =

British financier and racing driver

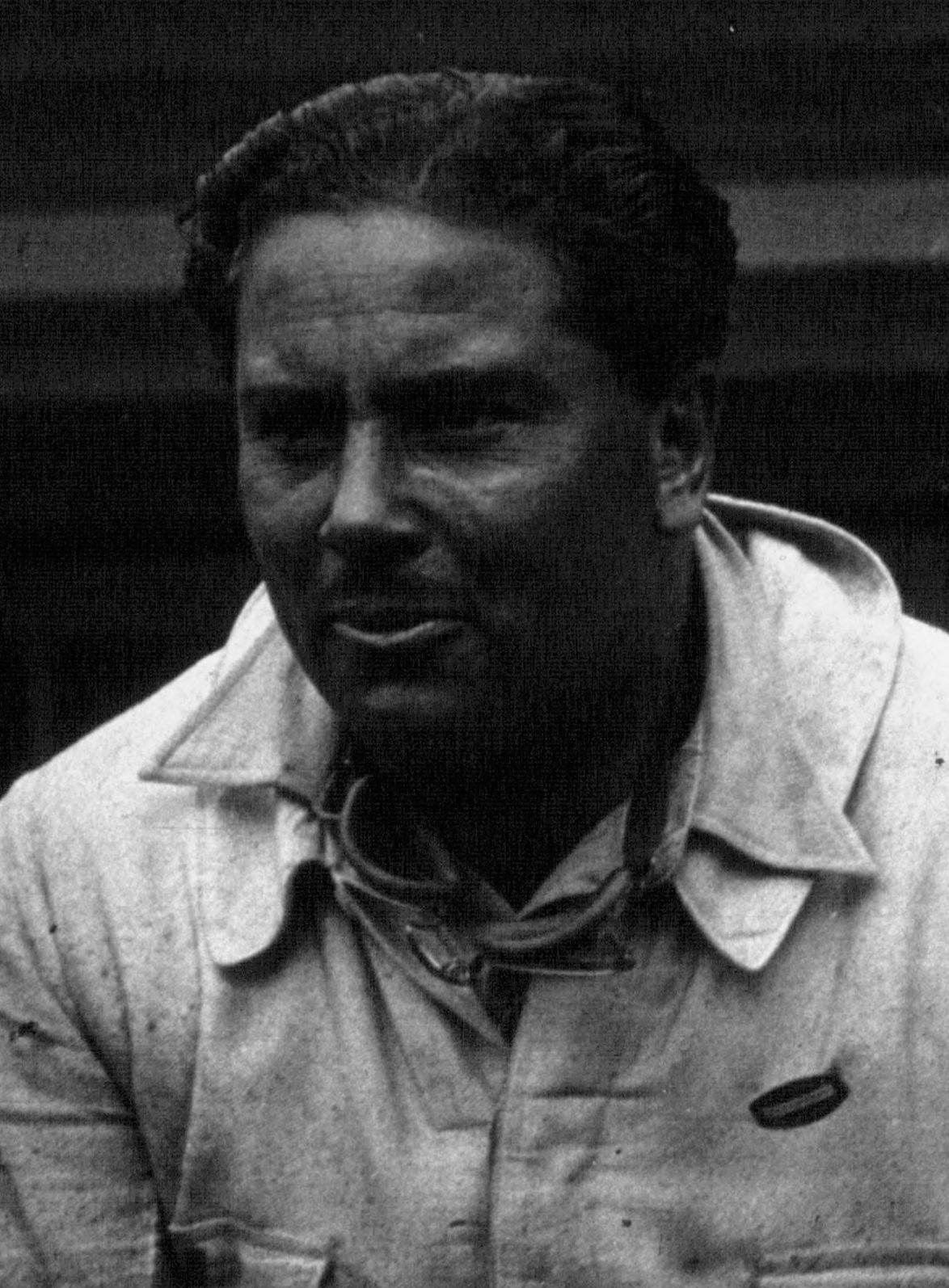
- Woolf Barnato at the 1929 24 Hours of Le Mans
- Nationality: (United Kingdom) British
- Born: Joel Woolf Barnato; 27 September 1895 Spencer House, London, England
- Died: 27 July 1948 (aged 52) London, England
- Resting place: St Jude's Church, Englefield Green
- Education: Trinity College, Cambridge
- Children: Diana Barnato Walker
- Parent: Barney Barnato

24 Hours of Le Mans career
- Years: 1928–1930
- Teams: Bentley Motors Ltd.
- Best finish: 1st (1928, 1929, 1930)
- Class wins: 3 (1928, 1929, 1930)

Joel Woolf Barnato (Note: Pronounced Barnatoo – from Barnett too) (27 September 1895 – 27 July 1948) was a British financier and racing driver, one of the "Bentley Boys" of the 1920s. He achieved three consecutive wins out of three entries in the 24 Hours of Le Mans race.

== Early life ==
The youngest son of Fanny Bees and Barney Barnato, who had made a fortune as a "Randlord" in South African diamond and gold mining, he was a relative of the Joel family of entrepreneurs.

Barnato was born at Spencer House, 27 St James's Place, London. He had a sister, Leah Primrose (died 1933) and a brother, Isaac "Jack" Henry (died 1918 of bronchial pneumonia). The family divided their time between London, Brighton, Colwyn Bay and South Africa.

In 1897, when Woolf was two years old, his father died near Madeira during a sea crossing from South Africa to London. The official verdict was suicide ("death by drowning while temporarily insane"). Woolf inherited his father's fortune, but with the monies placed in trust. He inherited his first instalment of £250,000 in 1914 at the age of 19. In addition, Woolf benefited from a further inheritance after the murder of Woolf Barnato Joel in Johannesburg in 1898.

Barnato was educated at Charterhouse School and Trinity College, Cambridge.

== Sports ==
Barnato's attitude to a new sport that took his interests, was to immerse himself in the learning process, practising endlessly and taking lessons only from the very best instructors he could find. His desire to excel at whatever he attempted was considerable.

Barnato collected prizes (including the 1925 Duke of York Trophy) for motor boat racing, using his Bentley-powered boat 'Ardenrun V'. A keen shot, he bred horses at his house Ardenrun, and hunted with the Old Surrey and Burstow Foxhounds. He was a strong swimmer, a good amateur boxer, and also played tennis to 'country house level'. He took golf lessons at Coombe Hill Golf Club, Kingston, Surrey, with the club professional Archie Compston, a friend of King Edward VIII.

== Career ==
Barnato served as an officer in the Royal Field Artillery, British Army in World War I. Serving in France, Egypt and Palestine, he attained the rank of captain in the latter stages of the war.

Having claimed a share of the business's profits from 1897 to 1916, in 1917, Barnato broke off his business arrangements with the Joels. After a long legal dispute in South Africa, Barnato settled for £900,000 plus £50,000 in costs. He then sued his family for the £50,000, as well as £23,883 for disbursements.

Following settlement of the case, Barnato played first-class cricket, appearing as wicket-keeper with Surrey County Cricket Club from 1928 to 1930.

== W. O. Bentley ==
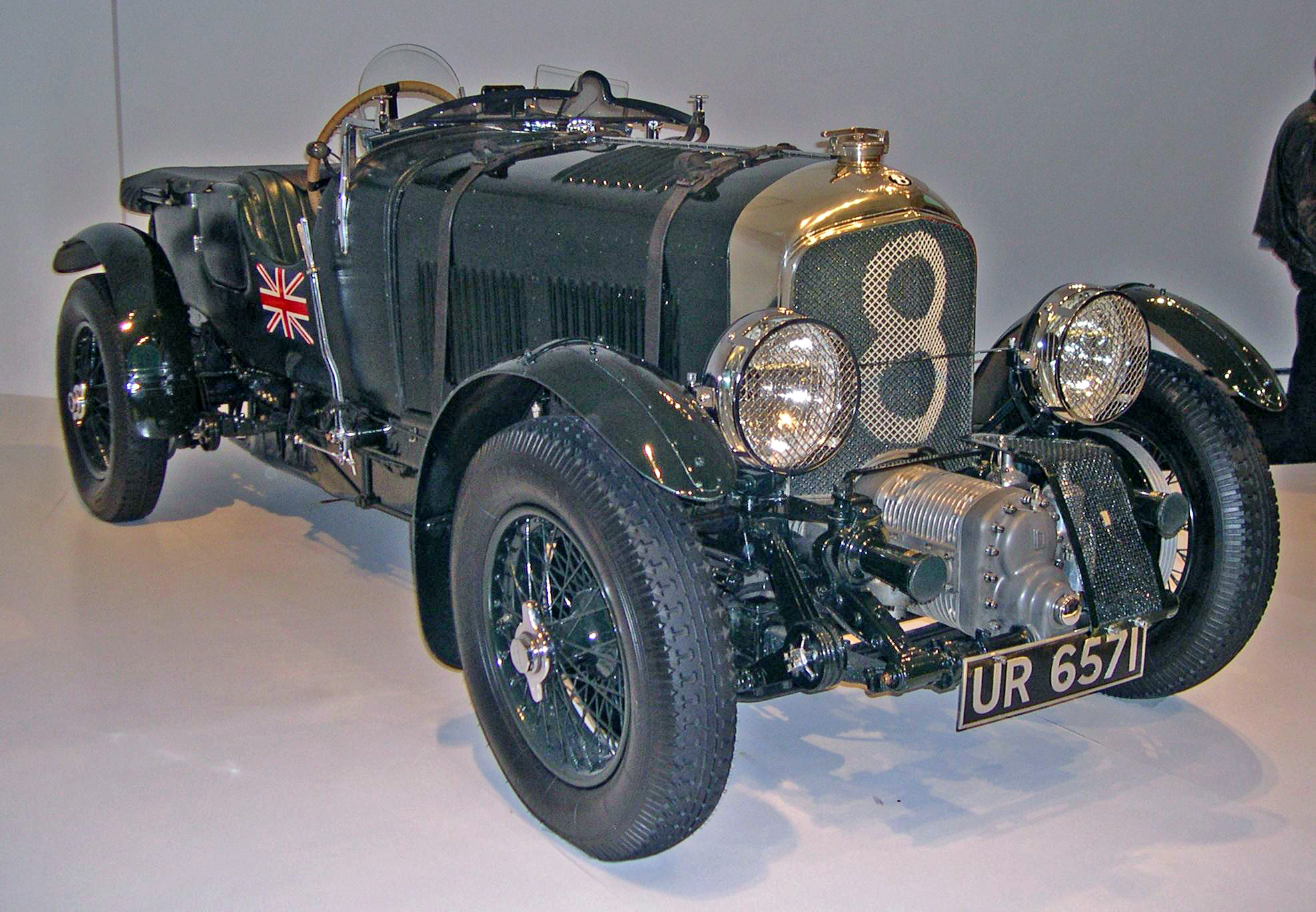
1929 "Blower" Bentley

Barnato purchased his first Bentley, a 3-litre, in 1925, 12 months before he acquired the business itself. With this car he won numerous Brooklands races. He was a member of a social set of wealthy British motorists known as the "Bentley Boys" who favoured the cars of W. O. Bentley. Many were independently wealthy, often with a background in military service. Barnato was nicknamed "Babe", in ironic deference to his heavyweight boxer's build.

Inspired by the 1924 Le Mans win by John Duff and Frank Clement, Barnato agreed to finance Bentley's business. Barnato had incorporated Baromans Ltd in 1922, which effectively existed as his finance and investment vehicle. Via Baromans, Barnato initially invested in excess of £100,000, saving the company and its workforce. A subsequent agreed wind-up of the original Bentley company was agreed, with all existing creditors paid off for £75,000, but with existing shares devalued from £1.00 each to just 1 shilling, or 5% or their original value. Barnato held 149,500 of the new shares, meaning that he controlled the company, and became chairman. Barnato injected further cash into the business: £35,000 as a debenture in July 1927; £40,000 in 1928; £25,000 in 1929.

With renewed financial input, W. O. Bentley was able to design another generation of cars, the six-cylinder 6½ Litre. However, the supercharged 4½ Litre (the famous "Blower" Bentley), which Barnato pushed through against Bentley's wishes, had poor durability and failed on the track.

The Wall Street crash of 1929 affected the Bentley business greatly, with the Great Depression reducing demand for the company's expensive products. In July 1931, two mortgage payments on the firm that were guaranteed by Barnato fell due, and accepting the inevitable, he advised the lenders that he was "unable to meet these debts." On 10 July, on the application of the mortgagee, the court appointed a Receiver to Bentley Motors Limited. After a period where it appeared that Napier was going to acquire the business, the firm passed into the hands of Rolls-Royce in November 1931 for the sum of £125,000 after a sealed bid auction.

Barnato received around £42,000 in return for his shares in the business, having bought a sizeable stake in Rolls-Royce not long before Bentley Motors was liquidated. By 1934, he was again on the board of Bentley Motors (1931) Ltd.

== Motor racing ==
Barnato first went motor racing in 1921, when after importing an eight-litre Locomobile from the United States, he signed-up to race at the Brooklands Easter meeting. Having come third in the 100-mile Long Handicap, he then swapped to a Calthorpe to compete in the following Whitsun meeting. For the 1922 season he bought a 1921 chassis Talbot directly from its owner/driver Malcolm Campbell, and for 1923 a Sir Alastair Miller customised-racing Wolseley Racing Moth. At the start of the 1924 season Barnato obtained an eight-litre Hispano-Suiza H6C chassis, which he commissioned Jarvis of Wimbledon to build a suitable racing body for. Barnato then established an eight-litre class racing record for the car.

In late 1924, Barnato obtained a prototype Bentley 3 Litre chassis, which was subsequently fitted with a boat-tail body by Jarvis for a cost of £400. Barnato used the car to win several major Brooklands races, and then partnered by John Duff set a new 3-litre 24-hour record averaging 95.03 miles per hour (152.94 km/h) at Autodrome de Montlhéry. Barnato later won the Brooklands Six Hour Race and Double Twelve Race in 1930. He was regarded by W.O. Bentley as, "The best driver we ever had and, I consider, the best British driver of his day. One who never made a mistake and always obeyed orders."

=== Le Mans ===
As a driver, Barnato won the 24 Hours of Le Mans race three times:

- 1928 – with Bernard Rubin in a Bentley 4½ litre
- 1929 – with Sir Henry "Tim" Birkin in a Bentley Speed Six ("Old Number One")
- 1930 – with Glen Kidston in a Bentley Speed Six ("Old Number One")

As these were the only years in which he entered the race, he has a perfect wins-to-starts ratio. Bentley, under his chairmanship, also won the race in 1927, with Dr J. Dudley "Benjy" Benjafield and S. C. H. "Sammy" Davis in a Bentley 3 Litre.

=== The Blue Train Races ===
In March 1930 at the Carlton Hotel, Cannes, during the Blue Train Races, Barnato raised the stakes on Rover and its Rover Light Six. Having raced and beaten Le Train Bleu for the first time, Barnato claimed that he could not only beat the Blue Train from Cannes to Calais, but could reach London in his 6½ litre Bentley Speed Six before the train even reached Calais, on a bet of 100 pounds sterling.

Barnato set off from the bar of the Carlton Hotel at just before 6pm on 13 March, accompanied by his friend Dale Bourne as unofficial co-driver. They stopped for fuel at Aix-en-Provence, Lyon, Auxerre and Paris. He arrived at the docks in Boulogne at 10:30 am on 14 March, in time for the 11:30 sailing to Folkestone. Barnato reached Dale Bourne's club (the Conservative) in St James's, London, at around 3:30 pm, having covered the 830 miles (1,340 km) in 22½ hrs, at an average speed of 43.43 miles per hour (69.89 km/h).

Barnato drove an H. J. Mulliner-bodied formal saloon in the race; the streamlined fastback "Sportsman Coupé" by Gurney Nutting which he took delivery of on 21 May 1930 also became known as the Blue Train Bentley and is regularly mistaken for or erroneously referred to as being the car that raced the Blue Train, while in fact Barnato named it in memory of his race. Further confusion is caused by the well-known painting by Terence Cuneo which depicts the Gurney Nutting car. Both vehicles are still in existence.

== Later life ==
From 1940 to 1945, Barnato was a wing commander with the Royal Air Force, responsible for the protection of aircraft factories against Luftwaffe bombing raids. He continued various low-key business opportunities out of his office on Park Lane.

== Personal life ==
Barnato was married three times:

- Dorothy Maitland Falk: 1915–1933, the daughter of an American stockbroker, two daughters Virginia and Diana
- Jacqueline Claridge Quealy: 1933–1947. The daughter of a wealthy American Wyoming colliery owner; the couple had two sons Michael Jay, and Peter Woolf (1934–1959; died of cancer, San Francisco)
- Joan Jenkinson: December 1947 – his death.

Barnato's daughter Diana Barnato Walker learned to fly at the Brooklands Flying Club in 1938 at the age of 20. She went on to ferry Spitfires, Hurricanes and Wellingtons with the Air Transport Auxiliary during World War II.

=== Residences ===
Barnato lived for most of the time in London, at his house at 39 Elsworthy Road, Hampstead, when married to Dorothy Maitland and, after his divorce, at his flat at 50 Grosvenor Square in Mayfair, on the south east corner of the square. Other Bentley Boys also had flats in the same block and, such was the number of Bentley cars parked outside, the location was known to taxi drivers as "Bentley's Corner".

Barnato also owned Ardenrun Place, a country house situated near Lingfield, Surrey. Originally built in 1906–1909 by Ernest Newton for the Konig family, the house was the scene of many lavish motor racing-themed parties for Barnato and his friends, but was destroyed by fire on 14 March 1933. He also owned the nearby Nuthill Farm in Redhill, which was used by his ex-wife Dorothy and his daughters Diana and Virginia at weekends.

After the loss of Ardenrun, in 1938, Barnato built a large castellated home named Ridgemead in Englefield Green, Surrey, at a cost of more than £100,000. Designed by Robert Lutyens, son of Sir Edwin Lutyens, Ridgemead featured innovations such as central heating, a "talkie" cinema and a drive lit by secret light rays. It had 25 bedrooms, a heated swimming pool and was set in 25 acres (10 ha) of land overlooking the River Thames at Runnymede. Upon Barnato's death in 1948, his wife Joan sold the house for £25,000 and it became a nursing home, which it remains.

During his final marriage, Barnato purchased an 8 acres (3.2 ha) plot named Perot's Island, in Bermuda, "as an investment after my death".

== Death ==
Barnato died at the London Clinic, Devonshire Place, on 27 July 1948 as a result of a thrombosis after an operation for cancer.

Barnato's funeral cortege was led by his Bentley "Old Number One", which was covered with flowers and wreaths. He is buried at St Jude's Church in Englefield Green, Surrey (grave 286, plot 25), next to his son-in-law Derek Walker (who had married his daughter Diana in 1944 and was killed in an aircraft crash in 1945) and next to his daughter Diana. Estimates of his wealth at the time of his death were between £1.5 and £5 million.

=== Posthumous honours ===
The Sports Car Club of America (SCCA) named its highest award in Barnato's honour; the first Woolf Barnato Award was presented in 1948, and has been presented every year from 1948 to the present (including the period it was renamed the Carl Haas Award, 1994–2001). Recipients are nominated by the past three winners and approved by SCCA's board of directors.

== Racing record ==
=== Complete 24 Hours of Le Mans results ===
Year	Team	Co-Drivers	Car	Class	Laps	Pos.	Class Pos.
1928	(United Kingdom) Bentley Motors Ltd	(Australia) Bernard Rubin	Bentley 4½ Litre	5.0	155	1st	1st
1929	(United Kingdom) Bentley Motors Ltd	(United Kingdom) Sir Henry "Tim" Birkin	Bentley Speed Six	8.0	174	1st	1st
1930	(United Kingdom) Bentley Motors Ltd	(United Kingdom) Glen Kidston	Bentley Speed Six	>3.0	179	1st	1st

== Notes ==
Preceded by Dudley Benjafield; Sammy Davis	Winner of the 24 Hours of Le Mans; 1928 with: Bernard Rubin	Succeeded by Woolf Barnato; Tim Birkin
Preceded by Woolf Barnato; Bernard Rubin	Winner of the 24 Hours of Le Mans; 1929 with: Tim Birkin	Succeeded by Woolf Barnato; Glen Kidston
Preceded by Woolf Barnato; Tim Birkin	Winner of the 24 Hours of Le Mans; 1930 with: Glen Kidston	Succeeded by Earl Howe; Tim Birkin
