= Bentley Boys =

1920s British racing drivers

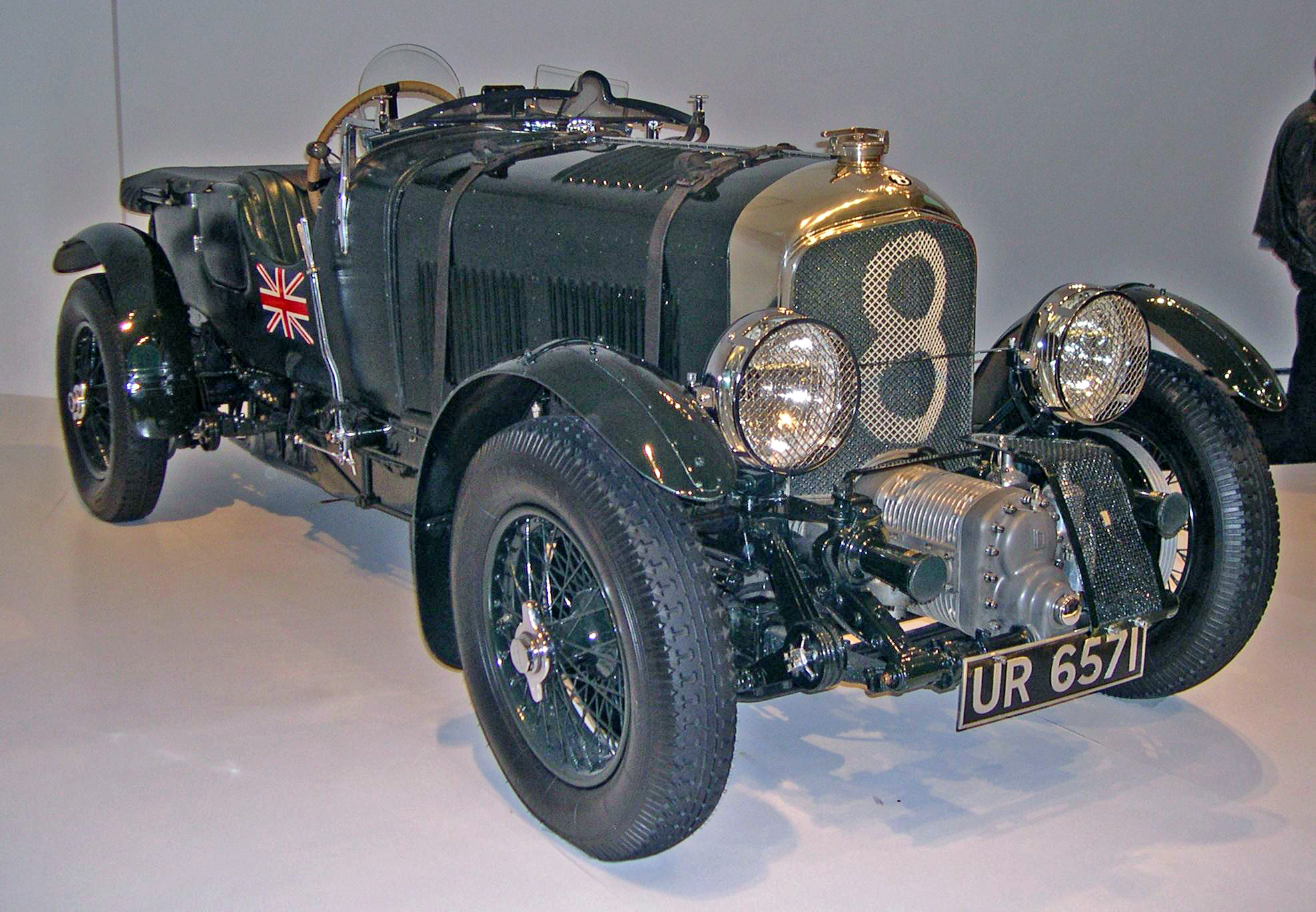
1929 "Blower" Bentley from the Ralph Lauren collection

The Bentley Boys were a group of wealthy British motorists who drove Bentley sports cars to victory in the 1920s and kept the marque's reputation for high performance alive. In 1925, as the marque floundered, Bentley Boy Woolf Barnato bought the company, leading to the creation of the famous supercharged Bentley Blower car.

The Bentley Boys included:

- Woolf "Babe" Barnato, heir to Kimberley diamond magnate Barney Barnato
- Dudley Benjafield
- Sir Henry "Tim" Birkin
- Dale Bourne
- Frank Clement
- S. C. H. "Sammy" Davis, automotive journalist, sports editor of The Autocar
- John Duff
- George Duller, steeplechaser
- Clive Dunfee
- Jack Dunfee
- Dudley Froy
- Baron Andre d'Erlanger, playboy
- Clive Gallop, engineer
- Prince George Imeretinsky
- Glen Kidston, aviator
- Bertie Kensington-Moir
- Bernard Rubin, pearl fishery magnate
- Jean Chassagne, French racing driver

Thanks to the dedication of this group to serious racing, the company, located at Cricklewood, north London, was noted for its four consecutive victories at the 24 hours of Le Mans from 1927 to 1930. Their greatest competitor at the time, Bugatti, whose lightweight, elegant, but fragile creations contrasted with the Bentley's rugged reliability and durability, referred to them as "the world's fastest lorries".

In March 1930, during the Blue Train Races, Woolf Barnato raised the stakes on Rover and its Rover Light Six having raced and beaten Le Train Bleu for the first time, to better that record with his 6½ litre Bentley Speed Six on a bet of £100. He drove against the train from Cannes to Calais, then by ferry to Dover and finally London, travelling on public highways, and won. The H. J. Mulliner-bodied formal saloon he drove during the race, as well as a streamlined fastback "Sportsman Coupe" by Gurney Nutting delivered to him on 21 May 1930 became known as the Blue Train Bentleys. The "Sportsman Coupe" has been erroneously referred to as being the car that raced the Blue Train, while in fact Barnato named it in memory of his race.

A great deal of Barnato's fortune went to keeping Bentley afloat after he became chairman in 1925; but the Great Depression destroyed demand for the company's expensive products, and it was finally sold off to Rolls-Royce in 1931.

== See also ==
- British Racing Drivers' Club
- Lagonda
