= George Duller =

British jockey and racecar driver (1891–1952)

- Nationality: (United Kingdom) British
- Born: 26 January 1891
- Died: 15 February 1970 (aged 83); Epsom, Surrey, England, UK

24 Hours of Le Mans career
- Years: 1925–1927
- Teams: Sunbeam Motor Co; Bentley Motors
- Best finish: N/A (DNF)
- Class wins: 0

George Edward Duller (26 January 1891 – 6 June 1962) was a British champion jockey, before becoming a racing car driver and one of the Bentley Boys. In later life, he trained racehorses.

== Early life ==
He was born in Canning Town, Essex (now London), the eldest of 12 children of George Henry Duller, a horse trainer, and his wife Ellen Clara Green.

== Personal life ==
Duller was first married to notable racer Bessie Grace Hyams in 1918; they divorced sometime in the 1930s-40s. They had one daughter named Grace Joan. Later, he married Violette Cordery's sister. He died at Epsom, Surrey while attending the August Bank horse races.

== Motor racing career ==
Duller raced in the 24 Hours of Le Mans three times, from 1925 to 1927. He did not finish the entire race in any of those three entries. He was involved in a pile-up crash at the Maison Blanche (White House) corner in the 1927 race; Duller was unharmed, but he did not enter the race again.

== Racing record ==
=== Complete 24 Hours of Le Mans results ===
Year	Team	Co-Drivers	Car	Class	Laps	Pos.	Class Pos.
1925	(United Kingdom) Sunbeam Motor Co	(United Kingdom) Henry Segrave	Sunbeam 3 Litre Super Sports	3.0	32	DNF (Transmission)	
1926	(United Kingdom) Bentley Motors Limited	(United Kingdom) Frank Clement	Bentley 3 Litre Speed	3.0	72	DNF (Engine)	
1927	(United Kingdom) Bentley Motors Limited	(France) Baron André d'Erlanger	Bentley 3 Litre Speed	3.0	34	DNF (Accident)	
