= John Duff =

Canadian racing driver (1895–1958)

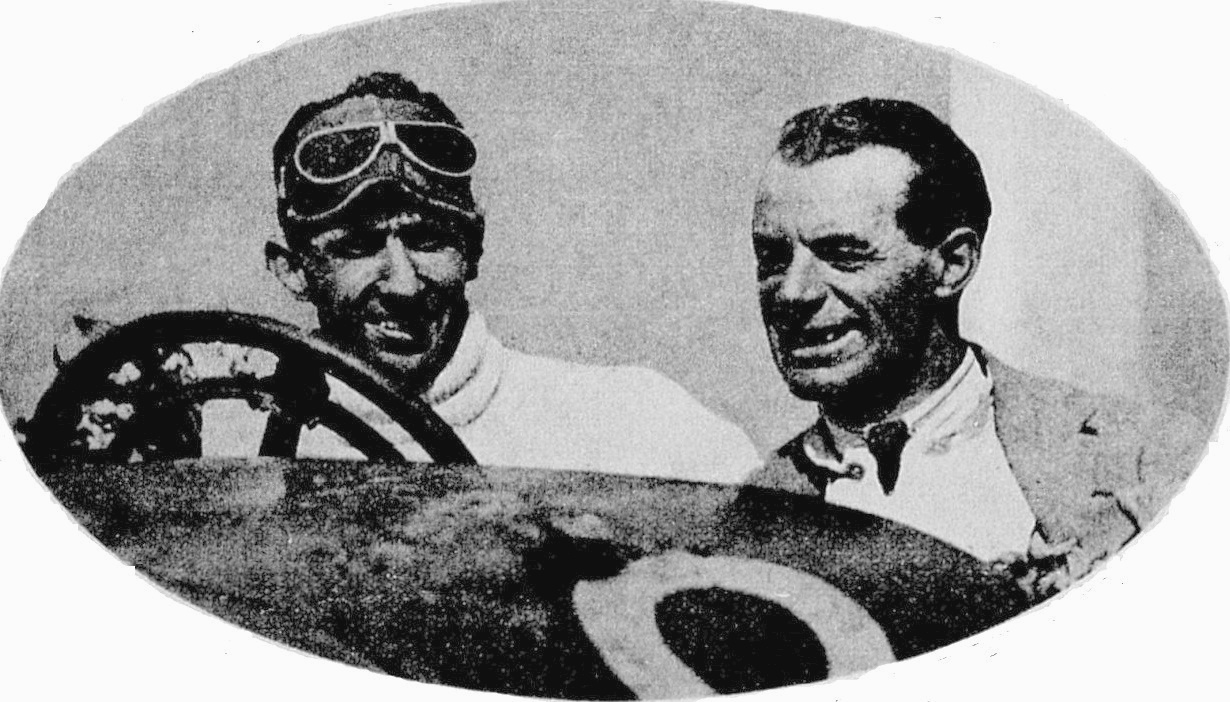
- Duff (left) with Frank Clement at Le Mans in 1924
- Nationality: (Canada) Canadian
- Born: John Francis Duff; January 17, 1895 Jiujiang, Jiangxi, China
- Died: January 9, 1958 (aged 62) Epping Forest, England, U.K.

Championship titles
- Major victories 24 Hours of Le Mans (1924)

Champ Car career
- 3 races run over 1 year
- Best finish: 17th (1926)
- First race: 1926 Indianapolis 500 (Indianapolis)
- Last race: 1926 Independence Day Classic (Rockingham Park)
Wins	Podiums	Poles
0	1	0

24 Hours of Le Mans career
- Years: 1923–1925
- Teams: Bentley, privateer
- Best finish: 1st (1924)
- Class wins: 1 (1924)

John Francis Duff (January 17, 1895 – January 8, 1958) was a Canadian racing driver. He is best known for winning the 1924 24 Hours of Le Mans.

== Early life ==
Duff was born in Jiujiang, China, to Canadian parents from Hamilton, Ontario, who had established a commercial outpost in nearby Guling. Duff was sent beck to Hamilton for schooling, living there until he was 16. He returned to China after his schooling.

Upon the outbreak of the First World War in 1914, Duff traveled across Russia to England, where he joined the army. Gravely wounded at the Third Battle of Ypres, Duff was sent to a hospital in England where he met and married his nurse. In 1919, John Duff learned how to drive a car and became a dealer. In 1920, he started racing.

== Racing career ==
In 1920, Duff began his racing career at Brooklands, a 2.6 mile long concrete track with concave banking. He drove a Fiat S.61, a 10-litre chain-driven car built in 1908. By August 1920, he was lapping in the same range as Henry Segrave, one of the great Brooklands and Grand Prix drivers of the 1920s.

Driving the S.61, Duff won the 75 Long Handicap at Brooklands in May 1921 at a speed of 104.19 mph. He won the 100 Long Handicap at Brooklands’ mid-summer meeting, averaging 104.85 mph. Duff was the fastest on the track for both wins. He also lost a number of races where he was the fastest. As Duff's driving skills improved, his reputation began to put him at a disadvantage with the handicappers.

In the off-season, Duff bought another old Fiat, the 18-litre pre-war racer called "Mephistopheles". In June, he took both Fiats to the Fanoe beach speed trials in Denmark. Duff set the fastest time of the meeting with a run at 165.9 km/h. He also took a class win with the S.61 at a speed of 149.2 km/h, the third fastest speed of the meeting.

In 1922, Duff sold the S.61 and focused on making Mephistopheles faster and more reliable. Harry Ricardo made a set of aluminum pistons and raised the engine’s compression ratio. In May, Duff finished third in Brooklands’ 100 Mile Handicap. In its next race, one of the Fiat's engine blocks detached from the crankcase. When the engine blew, the hood was torn off the car, just missing Duff's head. Engine parts rained down on the track. Duff sold the car for scrap.

1922 saw the birth of Duff and Aldington, a dealership set up to sell the new Bentley car. Duff raced a Bentley at Brooklands. On August 28, he took a stock 3-litre model to the track where he made an attempt on the "Double Twelve" record (24 Hour runs were not allowed at Brooklands due to the noise). The car broke before he could achieve that goal but, in the process, Duff set new Class E world records for 1, 2, and 3 hours, 100 and 200 miles, and 100, 200, 300, and 400 km.

Duff returned to Brooklands on September 27–28, driving both 12 hour shifts singlehanded to take the Double 12 at an average of 86.52 mph, for a total distance of 2,082 miles (3,351 km). He also broke the Class E world records for 1 to 12 hours and all distances from 100 to 1,000 miles and 100 to 1,600 km. In total, he set 38 international class records. The Double 12 record was an absolute record, regardless of class. The event was depicted on the cover picture of the first edition of the Brooklands Gazette, published in July 1924.

At Brooklands’ autumn meeting, Duff appeared at the wheel of J.L. Dunne’s old 21-litre Blitzen Benz. He lost the 100 Mile Handicap to Parry Thomas, despite lapping at 114.49 mph. Unable to stop the old car at the end of the last lap, Duff shot over the top of the banking, crashing through trees and a telegraph pole outside the circuit before finally coming to rest.

Early in 1923, Duff learned of a new 24 Hour race to be held at Le Mans. He was the first entrant. W. O. Bentley, the founder and then-owner of Bentley Motors, thought it was madness and that no car would finish. In the face of Duff’s determination, he agreed to have the car prepared at the factory and let his test driver, Frank Clement, partner Duff. The Duff/Clement Bentley was one of the fastest cars, Duff setting the fastest lap at 9 mins 39 sec for the 10.726 mile lap. Rough track conditions took their toll as a flying stone holed the fuel tank, forcing Duff to run back to the pits. As only the drivers could work on the cars, Clement had to bicycle back with a can of gas to power the car back to the pits. Despite the drama, Duff and Clement finished a strong fourth. More importantly, W.O. Bentley, who only went over at the last minute, became hooked on Le Mans, the race that would make his cars famous.

Duff then took his Bentley to the Spanish Touring Car GP at Lasarte. Leading with two laps to go, he was hit in the face by a stone thrown up by a lapped car. Duff crashed into a wall, injuring his jaw and breaking some teeth. Despite that, he won first place in the 3 litre class, as he had easily outlasted and outdistanced his competition. "In token of his gallant drive Duff was awarded the 3-litre trophy anyway, there being no other finishers in the class."

By 1924, Bentley was now fully committed to Le Mans. Duff was still a private entrant, using one of the dealership's cars. His car was prepared alongside the works entry using ideas Duff had come up with after the 1923 race. Partnered by Clement, in a race run in intense heat, Duff won handily, giving Bentley its first victory at Le Mans. In 1925, a carburetor fire ended Duff's chances at Le Mans.

On September 9–10, 1925, Duff went to the high-banked Montlhéry track, near Paris, for an attempt at the absolute 24 Hour Record. He had a special single-seater Weymann body on his Bentley and works driver Dudley Benjafield as his co-driver. In driving rain, they did the first 12 hours at 97.7 mph but missed the 12 hour record. At 18 ½ hours, the camshaft drive failed, ending the attempt. He was able to claim two world records: 1,000 Kilometres in 6 hrs, 23 mins, 55 secs and 1,000 miles in 10 hrs 15 mins 59secs. On September 21, Duff returned to Montlhéry with Woolf Barnato as his co-driver. Driving on a damp track in heavy mist, they covered 2,280 miles in 24 hours, averaging 95.02 mph. They beat the previous record, held by the 9-litre Renault of Garfield and Plessier, by over 7 mph. Along the way, the 3-litre Bentley took 21 world records, including those for six and twelve hours, and 500, 1000, and 2000 miles.

Looking for new challenges, Duff went to America in February 1926. He signed to drive a Miller sponsored by the Elcar Automobile Company in the Indianapolis 500, following the death of Herbert Jones, who was killed attempting to qualify for the race in the Elcar Special. In a race shortened to 400 miles by rain, Duff finished 9th. The next AAA championship event was on the 1.25 mile board track at Altoona, Pennsylvania on June 12. Duff finished 3rd in the 250 mile race, two laps down. The next race was on the Rockingham board track in Salem, New Hampshire. A puncture pitched Duff's car sideways, throwing him from the car. "John Duff of Indianapolis, Ind., wrecked his machine and suffered a broken collar bone when his car crashed through the top rail and dropped clear of the track." Duff suffered painful bone and muscle injuries, and a concussion that affected his vision. Knowing that his competitiveness would be compromised, and having promised his wife that he would quit if he suffered another serious injury, Duff retired from racing.

== Later life ==
After the accident, Duff brought his family over from England. They settled in Santa Monica, near Los Angeles. Duff opened a fencing academy where he trained many of the movie stars of the day. He doubled for his friend Gary Cooper and others in swordfighting scenes in Hollywood films. He also taught fencing at UCLA. In 1932, he coached some of his students on the U.S. Olympic team. When the Depression led to a decline in the demand for fencing instruction, Duff moved his family to China. The Duff family's settlement at Guling had prospered over the years and turned into a thriving resort. They stayed in China from 1932 to 1934, when they moved back to England. In January 1935 he became a member of the British Racing Drivers' Club. Duff continued to be a successful swordsman into the late 1930s. He also did well in business. The money he made allowed him to indulge his passion for horses. He became a competitive steeplechaser and show jumper. John Duff died in a riding accident in Epping Forest on January 8, 1958.

== Canadian nationality ==
Duff was born in China in 1895. Like everyone else in the British Empire, Canadians were subjects of the reigning monarch, not citizens of any country. If there had been Canadian citizenship, Duff would have qualified via his Canadian parents. John Duff can be found on the Canadian Census for both 1901 and 1911. There was a category for "Nationality". In both cases, Duff's was listed as Canadian. When John Duff started racing in 1920, he had lived a significant part of his life in Canada. Although there was no Canadian citizenship until 1947, Canada had issued its own passports since the 1860s. As late as 1932, John Duff carried a Canadian passport — which means that he carried one throughout his racing career. In a newspaper interview given after his last crash, Duff was clear about his Canadian origins.

== Awards and honors ==
Duff is a member of the Canadian Motorsport Hall of Fame.

== Motorsports career results ==
=== Indianapolis 500 results ===
Year	Car	Start	Qual	Rank	Finish	Laps	Led	Retired
1926	18	28	95.549	20	9	147	0	Flagged
Totals						147	0	

Starts	1
Poles	0
Front Row	0
Wins	0
Top 5	0
Top 10	1
Retired	0

=== 24 Hours of Le Mans results ===
Year	Team	Co-Drivers	Car	Class	Laps	Pos.	Class Pos.
1923	(United Kingdom) Bentley Motors Limited	(United Kingdom) Frank Clement	Bentley 3 Litre Sport	3.0	112	4th	3rd
1924	(United Kingdom) Bentley Motors Limited	(United Kingdom) Frank Clement	Bentley 3 Litre Sport	3.0	120	1st	1st
1925	(United Kingdom) Capt J. Duff (private entrant)	(United Kingdom) Frank Clement	Bentley 3 Litre Sport	5.0	64	DNF (Fire)	

== Notes and references ==
Sporting positions
Preceded by André Lagache; René Léonard	Winner of the 24 Hours of Le Mans; 1924 with: Frank Clement	Succeeded by Gérard de Courcelles; André Rossignol
