= Sammy Davis (racing driver) =

British racing driver (1887–1981)

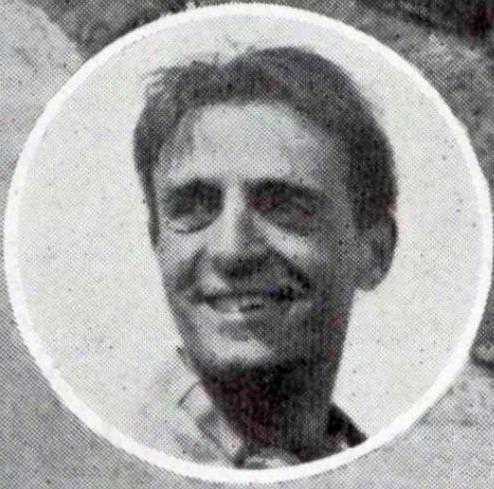
- Sammy Davis, winner of the 1927 24 Hours of Le Mans with Bentley
- Nationality: (United Kingdom) British
- Born: Sydney Charles Houghton Davis; 9 January 1887 London
- Died: 9 January 1981 (aged 94) Guildford
- Relatives: Colin Davis (son)

24 Hours of Le Mans career
- Years: 1925 – 1928, 1930, 1933
- Teams: Sunbeam; Bentley Motors Ltd. Alvis; Aston Martin Ltd.
- Best finish: 1st (1927)
- Class wins: 2 (1925, 1927)

Sydney Charles Houghton "Sammy" Davis (9 January 1887, London – 9 January 1981, Guildford) was a British racing motorist, journalist, graphic artist and clubman.

== Early life ==
Davis was born in South Kensington, London on 9 January 1887, the son of Edwin and Georgina Davis, his father was a merchant and tea importer. He was educated at Westminster School and University College London. While at school, he met Malcolm Campbell, and the duo were involved in a "spectacular pile-up" with a borrowed penny-farthing bicycle. In 1906 Davis became an apprentice with the Daimler Company. Training as a draughtsman, he became involved with the design of various products, from the Daimler-Renard Road Train to Daimler's team of cars in the 1907 Kaiserpreis race. In 1910, he joined the staff of Automobile Engineer, just then being launched by Iliffe (also publishers of The Autocar) as a technical illustrator and was by 1912 also a writer and sub-editor. At the start of the First World War he joined the Royal Naval Air Service and served in France with armoured car section. Following his demobilisation he became sports editor of The Autocar although he also served in the Second World War in the Royal Electrical and Mechanical Engineers.

== Racing career ==
While best known as sports editor of The Autocar, writing under the pen-name Casque (French for helmet), Davis also competed in many forms of motor racing in the 1920s. He won many awards in the popular trials competitions of the day.

As sports editor, Davis aided his prewar motorcycling associate, W. O. Bentley, in starting his company. In 1921, Davis was invited by S. F. Edge to join Edge's Brooklands AC racing team, in between magazine deadlines, while in 1922 he was part of Aston Martin's effort to break no less than 32 world and class records at Weybridge. Davis became one of the famous Bentley Boys of the late 1920s. He won the 24 Hours of Le Mans outright in 1927. Partnered with Dr. Benjafield, they covered 1,472.527 miles at an average speed of 61.354 mph (98.740 km/h). Motor Sport reported: "The victory, in spite of its accident of the crippled 3-litre Bentley driven by J.D. Benjafield and S.C.H. Davis, will always remain an epic, and even if the competition was not as keen as in the past, it is great thing to have won a race with a car which was damaged in the early part of the event." In 1928 he finished ninth overall at Le Mans on a 1½-litre front-wheel-drive Alvis.

In 1925, Davis finished second at Le Mans with co-driver Jean Chassagne in a 3-litre twin cam Sunbeam, covering 1,343.2 mi (2,161.7 km), some 45 mi (72 km) behind the winner. Davis piloted a 3-litre Bentley at Le Mans in 1926, crashing in an attempt to take the lead only twenty minutes from the flag. On 7 May 1927, Davis finished second in the Essex Car Club Six Hour race at Brooklands on an Alvis 12/50. At Le Mans that year, Davis became the stuff of racing legend when, at the wheel of the 3-litre Bentley "Old Number Seven", he skidded into a pileup at White House and saw the chassis twist, but nevertheless went on to win. Davis would enter the 1928 Le Mans, coming ninth at the wheel of a front wheel drive 1,500 cc (92 cu in) Alvis shared with Urquhart-Dykes. He would also come second at the 1929 Saorstat Cup, Phoenix Park, and at the Brooklands Double-Twelve (24 hours in two shifts, because the track was prohibited from holding racing at night) and 500 mi (800 km).

In 1929, Davis finished second overall, and class winner, in the Brooklands Double Twelve on a 4,398 c.c. Bentley. He finished second again in 1930 on a 5,597 c.c. Bentley. At Le Mans in 1930 he met with misfortune, when his goggles were shattered by a stone, forcing his retirement; there were concerns he might be blinded. On 4 October 1930, Davis was partnered with the Earl of March in an Austin Seven and they won the B.R.D.C. 500-mile race at Brooklands outright, at an average speed of 83.41 mph (134.24 km/h). Also at Brooklands that year, Davis set several Class H records in the Seven, including a flying kilometre of 89.08 mph (143.36 km/h). (For the kilometre, his co-driver was Charles Goodacre.) His efforts for the year earned him a BRDC Gold Star. He also entered a Daimler Double-Six sleeve-valve V12 at Monte Carlo.

He had a spectacular accident in a low-chassis Invicta S-type at Brooklands in 1931, skidding into a telegraph pole. In 1933 he finished ninth at Le Mans in an Aston Martin.

At the 1935 Tourist Trophy, Davis' Singer Nine crashed due to a broken steering ball-joint. He hit Norman Black's Nine, which had crashed for the same reason at the same place. Despite the severity of the crash, Davis was unhurt.

On 15 April 1937, Davis drove a Frazer-Nash BMW round Brooklands, covering more than 100 mi (160 km) in an hour, at an average speed of 102.22 mph (164.51 km/h) The same year, his Wolseley earned "a special award for being the best-equipped car to finish".

== Other interests ==
Davis also acquired an 1897 Léon Bollée Automobiles tricar, which he named Beelzebub, and continued to use into the 1960s before selling it to the Indianapolis Speedway Museum. In time, his interest in veteran cars led him to co-found the Veteran Car Club of Great Britain in 1930. He was first vice-president of the Aston Martin Owners Club in 1935, designing the Aston Martin "wings" badge. After the war, he did much to promote the revival of motorsport in Britain, both as vice-president of the Vintage Sports-Car Club and as President of the new 500 Club (later the British Racing and Sports Car Club). He was a committee member of the BRDC. He also served on the Competitions Committee of the Royal Automobile Club, the governing body of motor sport in the United Kingdom.

While in hospital after his 1931 Brooklands crash, Davis wrote Motor Racing.

In addition to his serious journalistic works on racing and racers, Davis published lighter books under the pseudonym Casque (French for “helmet”). These works showcased his humorous cartoons of racing cars, drivers, and the quirks of the motor racing world between the wars. Drawing on his insider perspective, Davis highlighted the fallibility of drivers, the shortcomings of officials, and the unreliability of racing machines, making his books both entertaining and informative. His sketchbooks cover events such as Brooklands, Le Mans, Alpine Trials, the Monte Carlo Rally, and TT races. His focus on the (un)reliability of racing cars is further evident in his 1950 book Expensive Noises, which features numerous exploding engines.

Davis would attend racing events, write, and paint into his 80s.

== Later life ==
Davis lived his later years in Guildford. He was a great storyteller and made a modest living writing articles and painting in oils. He was an excellent driver and even as his years advanced he trained police drivers at Hendon. He owned a Bug-eyed Sprite and an 1897 Léon Bollée tricar, called "Beelzebub," which he took on the annual London to Brighton Veteran Car Run. He had completed the London-Brighton course in 1930 in the Léon Bollée in a time of 3hrs 20mins 0secs at an average speed of 17.17 m.p.h. Davis was honoured at the Royal Automobile Club in London on 19 February 1976 attended by 100 of his friends and many French dignitaries including the Mayor of the City of Le Mans and was awarded "The Le Mans Gold Medal and Honorary citizenship". He died in a fire in his home in Guildford on his 94th birthday, some say caused by his smouldering pipe but more likely by an overturned paraffin heater.

His son Colin Davis also became a driver.

== Racing record ==
=== Complete 24 Hours of Le Mans results ===
Year	Team	Co-Drivers	Car	Class	Laps	Pos.	Class Pos.
1925	(United Kingdom) Sunbeam Motor Co	(France) Jean Chassagne	Sunbeam 3 Litre Super Sports	3.0	125	2nd	1st
1926	(United Kingdom) Bentley Motors Ltd	(United Kingdom) Dr Dudley Benjafield	Bentley 3 Litre Speed	3.0	137	DNF (Accident)	
1927	(United Kingdom) Bentley Motors Ltd	(United Kingdom) Dr Dudley Benjafield	Bentley 3 Litre Speed	3.0	137	1st	1st
1928	(United Kingdom) Alvis Car and Engineering Company	(United Kingdom) Bill Urquhart-Dykes	Alvis FA12/50	1.5	130	9th	2nd
1930	(United Kingdom) Bentley Motors Ltd	(United Kingdom) Clive Dunfee	Bentley Speed Six	>3.0	21	DNF (Accident)	
1933	(United Kingdom) Aston Martin Ltd.	(United Kingdom) Augustus "Bert" Bertelli	Aston Martin 1½ Le Mans	1.5	174	7th	3rd

== Books (incomplete list) ==
- Davis, S.C.H. (1932). Motor Racing. London: Iliffe and Sons.
- — (1930?). under the pseudonym Casque - Casque's Sketchbook, Motor Racing in a Lighter Vein (with cartoon illustrations also by Davis) London: Iliffe and Sons
- — (1935). More Sketches by Casque (with cartoon illustrations also by Davis). London: Iliffe and Sons
- — (1949). Racing Motorist. His Adventures at Wheel in War & Peace. London: Iliffe and Sons.
- — (1950) Expensive Noises (with cartoon Iluustrations also by Davis)
- — (1951). Rallies and Trials. London: Iliffe and Sons.
- — (1951). Controlling a Racing-Car Team. London: G. T. Foulis & Co.
- — (1952). Car Driving as an Art: A Guide for Learners and Advanced Drivers. London: Iliffe and Sons.
- — (1953). The John Cobb Story. London: G. T. Foulis & Co.
- — (no date but probably late 1950s). Atalanta. Women as Racing Drivers London: G.T. Foulis & Co.
- — (1963). Teaching To Drive. London: G. T. Foulis & Co.
- — (1967). CARS CARS CARS CARS. London: Paul Hamlyn.

== Footnotes ==
Sporting positions
Preceded by Robert Bloch; André Rossignol	Winner of the 24 Hours of Le Mans; 1927 with: Dr. Dudley Benjafield	Succeeded by Woolf Barnato; Bernard Rubin
