= Frank Clement (racing driver) =

British racing driver

- Nationality: (United Kingdom) British
- Born: Frank Charles Clement; 15 June 1886
- Died: 15 February 1970 (aged 83); Northumberland, England, UK

24 Hours of Le Mans career
- Years: 1923–1930
- Teams: Private entries Bentley Motors
- Best finish: 1st (1924)
- Class wins: 1 (1924)

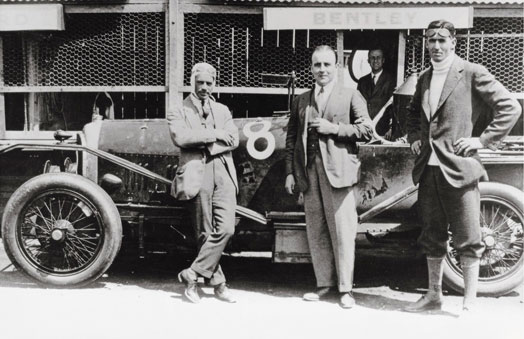
Left to right: Frank Clement, W.O. Bentley, and John Duff in front of their Bentley which won the 1924 24 Hours of Le Mans.

Frank Charles Clement (15 June 1886 – 15 February 1970) was a British racing driver who, along with Canadian John Duff, won the 1924 24 Hours of Le Mans.

== Career ==
One of the "Bentley Boys", Clement was recruited by W.O. Bentley as a test driver for Bentley Motors. He was chosen by the company to drive in the inaugural 24 Hours of Le Mans in 1923 with John Duff in Duff's privately entered car. The only British team in the event, the pair finished the race in fourth after fighting for the lead for much of the race. The following year Duff returned with his private Bentley and the two won the race outright over several Lorraine-Dietrichs and Chenard-Walckers.

In a bid to win the Rudge-Whitworth Triennial Cup, the two drivers remained paired in 1925, and Bentley offered more support by adding a second car to the team. However, their car would fail halfway through the event and would not be able to finish. Bentley improved to a three car team for 1926, and Clement was assigned to co-drive with George Duller, although once again the car was not able to finish. Over the next two years, although Bentley won Le Mans two more times, Clement's car still was unable to finish the endurance event. In 1929 Clement once again was able to last the entire event as Bentley dominated, earning the top four finishing positions, and (with Jack Barclay) Clement won the inaugural International 500 Miles Race in a 4.5l Bentley, albeit the pair was only second fastest in a race run to a handicap formula. Clement ran his final Le Mans in 1930, finishing in second place, before Bentley chose not to continue at Le Mans the following year.

== Racing record ==
=== Complete 24 Hours of Le Mans results ===
Year	Team	Co-Drivers	Car	Class	Laps	Pos.	Class Pos.
1923	(United Kingdom) Bentley Motors Limited	(Canada) Capt John Duff	Bentley 3 Litre Sport	3.0	112	4th=	3rd
1924	(United Kingdom) Bentley Motors Limited	(Canada) Capt John Duff	Bentley 3 Litre Sport	3.0	120	1st	1st
1925	(United Kingdom) Capt J. Duff (private entrant)	(Canada) Capt John Duff	Bentley 3 Litre Sport	5.0	64	DNF (Fire)	
1926	(United Kingdom) Bentley Motors Limited	(United Kingdom) George Duller	Bentley 3 Litre Speed	3.0	72	DNF (Engine)	
1927	(United Kingdom) Bentley Motors Limited	(United Kingdom) Leslie Callingham	Bentley 4½ Litre	5.0	35	DNF (Accident)	
1928	(United Kingdom) Bentley Motors Ltd	(United Kingdom) Dr Dudley Benjafield	Bentley 4½ Litre	5.0	71	DNF (Radiator)	
1929	(United Kingdom) Bentley Motors Ltd	(France) Jean Chassagne	Bentley 4½ Litre	5.0	157	4th	3rd
1930	(United Kingdom) Bentley Motors Ltd	(United Kingdom) Dick Watney	Bentley Speed Six	>3.0	173	2nd	2nd

Sporting positions
Preceded by André Lagache; René Léonard	Winner of the 24 Hours of Le Mans; 1924 with: John Duff	Succeeded by Gérard de Courcelles; André Rossignol
