= Dudley Benjafield =

British racing driver and doctor (1887–1957)

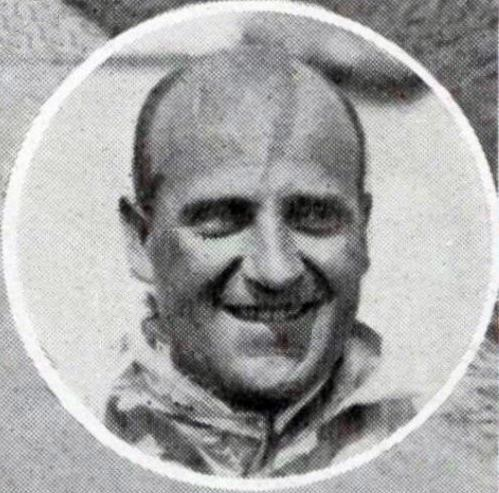
- Dudley Benjafield was a British medical doctor and racing driver.
- Nationality: (United Kingdom) British
- Born: Joseph Dudley Benjafield; 6 August 1887; Edmonton, London
- Died: 20 January 1957 (aged 69); London

24 Hours of Le Mans career
- Years: 1925 – 1930, 1935
- Teams: Bentley Motors Ltd. Private
- Best finish: 1st (1927)
- Class wins: 1 (1927)

Joseph Dudley "Benjy" Benjafield, MD (6 August 1887 – 20 January 1957) was a British medical doctor and racing driver.

== Career ==
Benjafield was born in Edmonton, London, UK. He attended the University of London and received his MD from University College Hospital in 1912. Specializing in bacteriology, he served in Egypt during World War I and later used his expertise combating the great flu epidemic of 1918–1919.

Benjafield had a passion for motorsports which started with boating, but moved on to automobiles in the 1920s, following the accidental destruction of his beloved motor launch. Upon purchasing a Bentley 3-litre, he started racing in 1924 and 1925. Benjafield's success led to him being offered to drive a company racer at the behest of Bentley founder W.O. Bentley. He competed in the 24 Hours of Le Mans seven times, and won the event in 1927 with co-driver and fellow "Bentley Boy" S. C. H. "Sammy" Davis; while their car was badly damaged, they frantically made on-the-spot repairs and wound up winning the race.

Benjafield later created the British Racing Drivers' Club, and continued racing until 1936. He died on 20 January 1957.

== Racing record ==
=== Complete 24 Hours of Le Mans results ===
Year	Team	Co-Drivers	Car	Class	Laps	Pos.	Class Pos.
1925	(United Kingdom) Bentley Motors Ltd	(United Kingdom) Bertie Kensington-Moir	Bentley 3 Litre Sport	5.0	19	DNF (Out of fuel)	
1926	(United Kingdom) Bentley Motors Ltd	(United Kingdom) Sammy Davis	Bentley 3 Litre Speed	3.0	137	DNF (Accident)	
1927	(United Kingdom) Bentley Motors Ltd	(United Kingdom) Sammy Davis	Bentley 3 Litre Speed	3.0	137	1st	1st
1928	(United Kingdom) Bentley Motors Ltd	(United Kingdom) Frank Clement	Bentley 4½ Litre	5.0	71	DNF (Radiator)	
1929	(United Kingdom) Bentley Motors Ltd	(France) Baron André d'Erlanger	Bentley 4½ Litre	5.0	159	3rd	2nd
1930	(United Kingdom) Hon. Dorothy Paget	(Italy) Giulio Ramponi	Bentley 4½ Litre 'Blower'	>3.0	144	DNF (Engine)	
1935	(United Kingdom) Arthur W. Fox & Charles Nichol	(United Kingdom) Sir Roland Gunter	Lagonda M45R Rapide	5.0	196	13th	3rd

Sporting positions
Preceded by Robert Bloch; André Rossignol	Winner of the 24 Hours of Le Mans; 1927 with: Sammy Davis	Succeeded by Woolf Barnato; Bernard Rubin
Preceded by none	BRDC President; 1928–1929	Succeeded by Francis Curzon
