= Bentley 3 Litre =

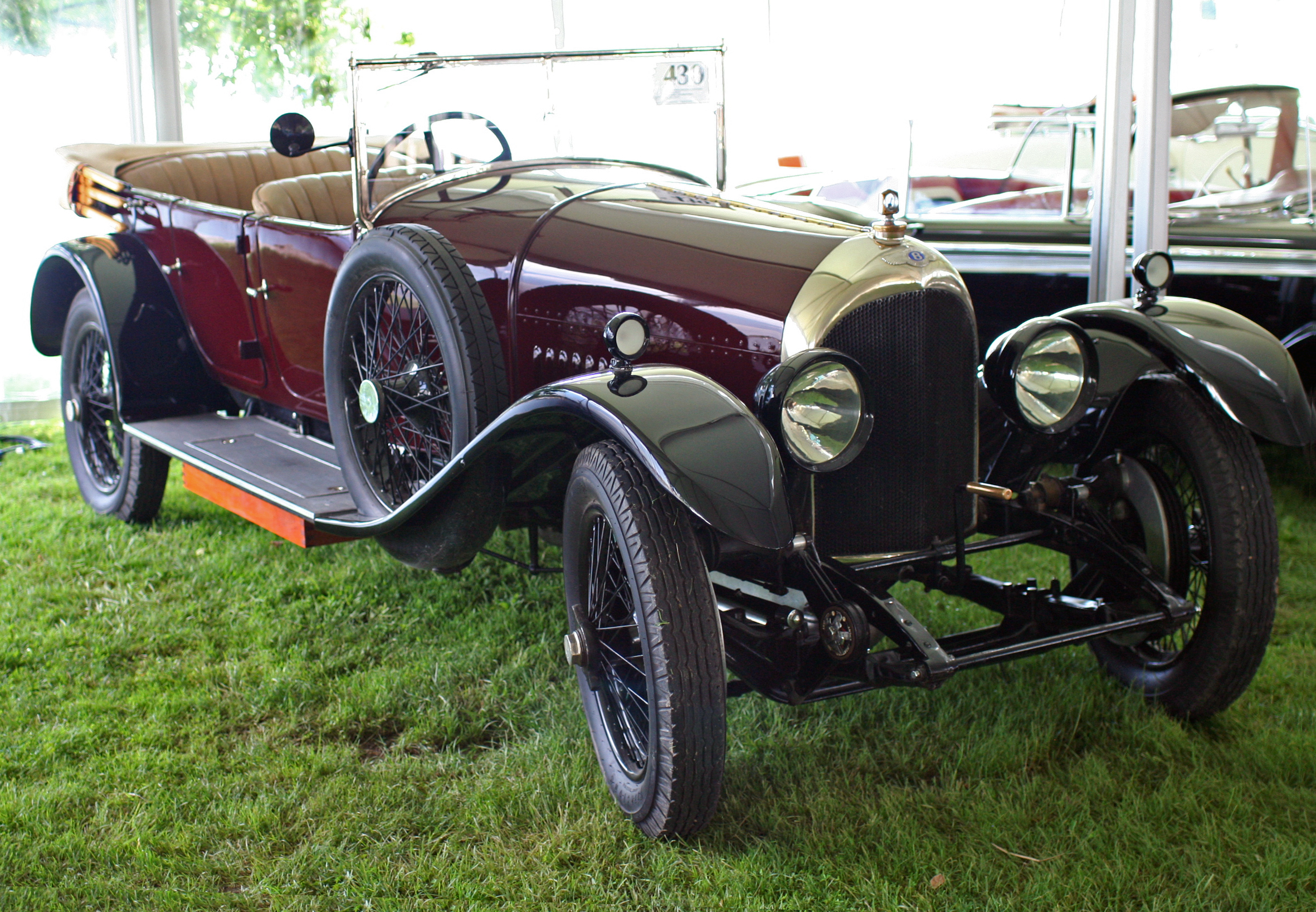
- 1924 Blue label tourer by Park Ward

Overview
- Manufacturer: Bentley Motors Limited
- Production: 1921–1929; 1,622 produced
- Assembly: United Kingdom: Cricklewood
- Designer: Walter Owen Bentley

Body and chassis
- Class: Sports car
- Body style: as arranged with coachbuilder by customer

Powertrain
- Engine: 3.0 L OHC 4-valve I4

Dimensions
- Wheelbase: 108 in (2,743 mm); 117.5 in (2,984 mm); 130 in (3,302 mm)

Chronology
- Successor: 4½ Litre

The Bentley 3 Litre was a car chassis manufactured by Bentley. The company's first, it was developed from 1919 and made available to customers' coachbuilders from 1921 to 1929. The Bentley was very much larger than the 1368 cc Bugattis that dominated racing at the time, but double the size of engine and strength compensated for the extra weight. The 4000 lb (1800 kg) car won the 24 Hours of Le Mans in 1924, with drivers John Duff and Frank Clement, and again in 1927, this time in Super Sports form, with drivers S. C. H. "Sammy" Davis and Dudley Benjafield. Its weight, size, and speed prompted Ettore Bugatti to call it "the fastest lorry in the world", which was regarded as a compliment. Built in 3 main variants, Blue label, Red Label Speed models all carrying a 5-year warranty, and the coveted and rare Green Label 100 mph cars, which only carried a 12-month warranty reflecting the high state of tune.

== Coachwork ==
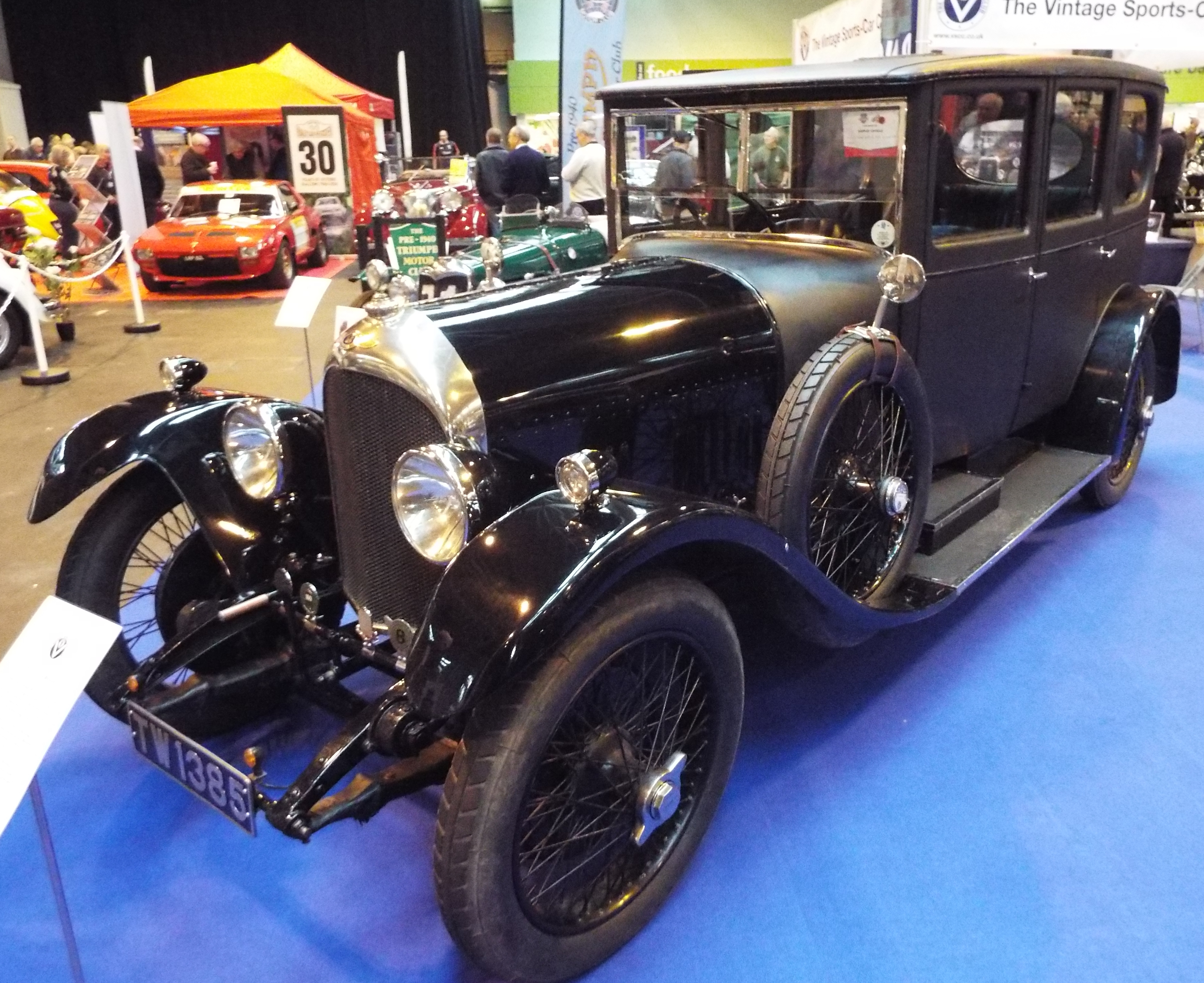
Rare original saloon, a Weymann by Gurney Nutting 1926 Few limousine or saloon bodies have not been replaced by new racing or tourer bodies

The 3 Litre was delivered as a running chassis to the coachbuilder of the buyer's choice. Bentley referred many customers to their near neighbour Vanden Plas for bodies. Dealers might order a short cost-saving run of identical bodies to their own distinctive design. Most bodies took the simplest and cheapest form, tourers, but as it was all bespoke or "custom" coachwork, there was plenty of variation. Customers included Prince George, Duke of Kent, Gertrude Lawrence, and Beatrice Lillie.

== Engineering ==
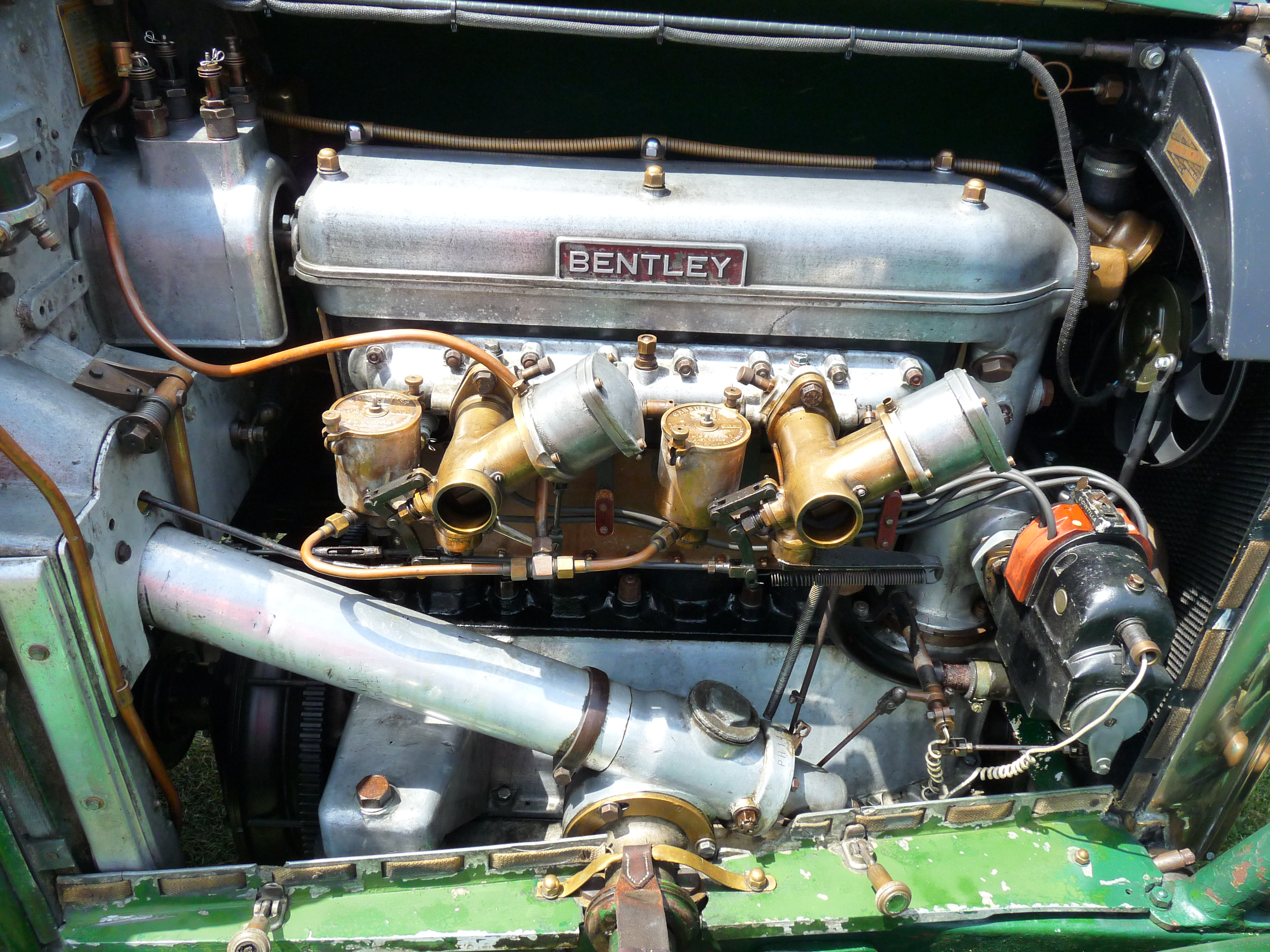
Red label Speed high compression twin SU Engine PH1468 delivered March 1926 in a tourer with licence plate KM 2321

The 3.0 L (2,996 cc or 183 cu in) straight-4 engine was designed by ex-Royal Flying Corps engineer Clive Gallop and was very technically advanced for its time. It was one of the first production car engines with 4 valves per cylinder, dry-sump lubrication and an overhead camshaft. The four valve SOHC Hemi design, with a bevel-geared shaft drive for the camshaft, was based on the pre-World War I 1914 Mercedes Daimler M93654 racing engine. Just before the outbreak of the war Mercedes had placed one of the winning Grand Prix cars in their London showroom in Long Acre. At the suggestion of W.O. Bentley, then being commissioned in the Royal Naval Air Service, the vehicle was confiscated in 1915 by the British army, dismantled at Rolls-Royce and subjected to scrutiny. A notable difference to both the Mercedes and the aero engines was the cast-iron monobloc design, and the fully Aluminium enclosed camshaft, which greatly contributed to its durability. But having the valve-head and block in one-piece made for a complicated and labour-intensive casting and machining. This was a feature shared during that time by the Bugattis which the car was later to compete with. The engine was also among the first with two spark plugs per cylinder, pent-roof combustion chambers, and twin carburettors. It was extremely undersquare, optimized for low-end torque, with a bore of 80 mm (3.1 in) and a stroke of 149 mm (5.9 in).

Un-tuned power output was around 70 hp (52 kW), allowing the 3 Litre to reach 80 mph (129 km/h). The Speed Model could reach 90 mph (145 km/h); the Super Sports could exceed 100 mph (161 km/h).

A four-speed gearbox was fitted.

The chassis from a Humber was designed by Frederick Tasker Burgess (1879–1929), previously chief designer at Humber, who had worked with W.O. during the war producing the aero engines BR1 and BR2.

Bentley did not deliver complete vehicles, but—as was customary—provided only a rolling chassis.

Only the rear wheels had brakes until 1924, when four-wheel brakes were introduced.

== Variants ==
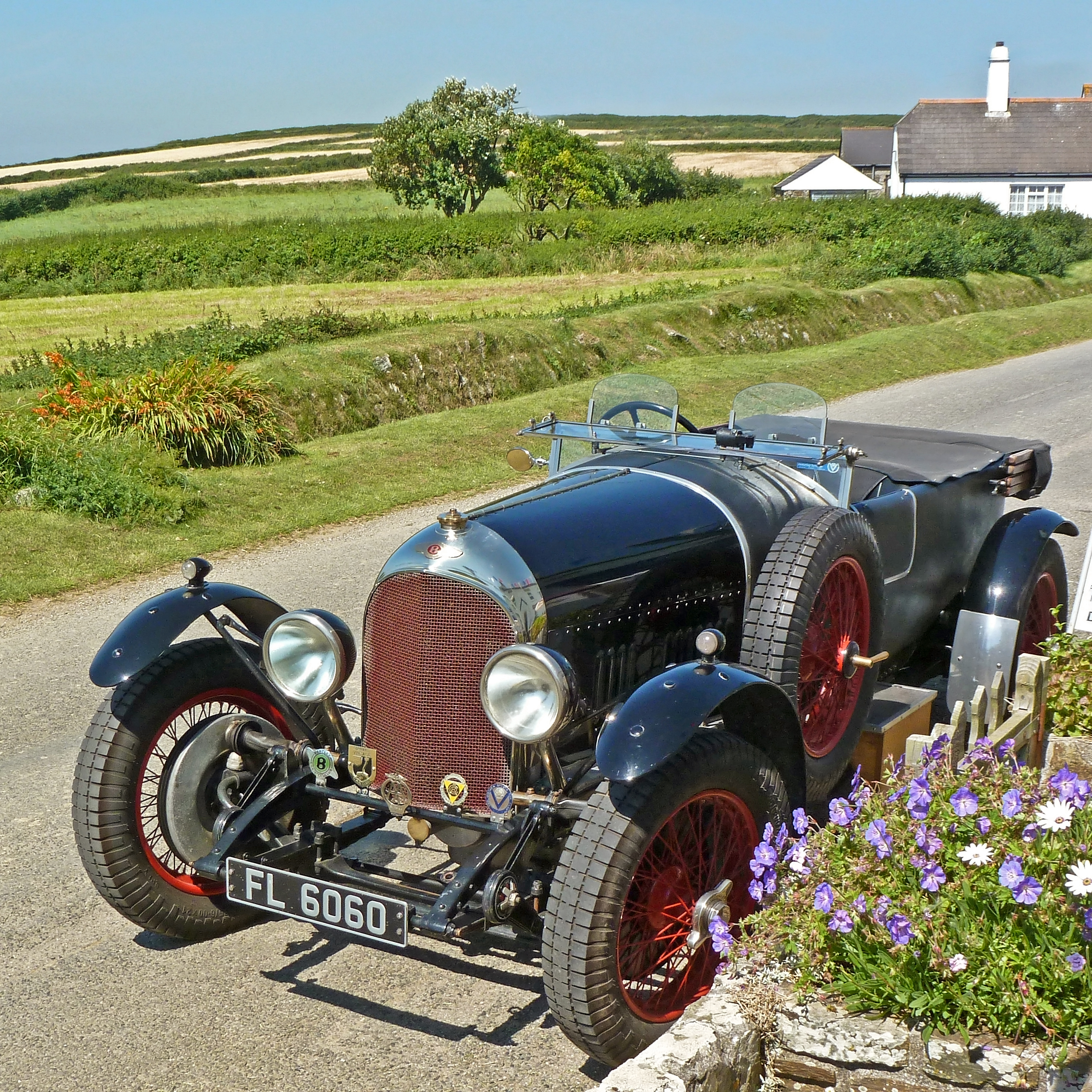
Red label Speed 4-seater tourer 1927

There were three main variants of the 3-litre and they became known by the colours commonly used on the radiator badge. There was a definite rule controlling badge colours but astonishingly it has since been established that given "special circumstances" the factory would indeed supply a "wrong" colour.

=== Blue label ===
This was the standard model with 117.5 in (2,984 mm) wheelbase from 1921 to 1929 or long 130.0 in (3,302 mm) wheelbase from 1923 to 1929.

=== Red label ===
This used a 5.3:1 high compression engine in the 117.5 in (2,984 mm) wheelbase chassis and was made from 1924 to 1929.

=== Green label ===
Made between 1924 and 1929 this was the high performance model with 6.3:1 compression ratio and short 108 in (2,743 mm) wheelbase chassis. 100 mph (160 km/h) performance was guaranteed.

== Production ==
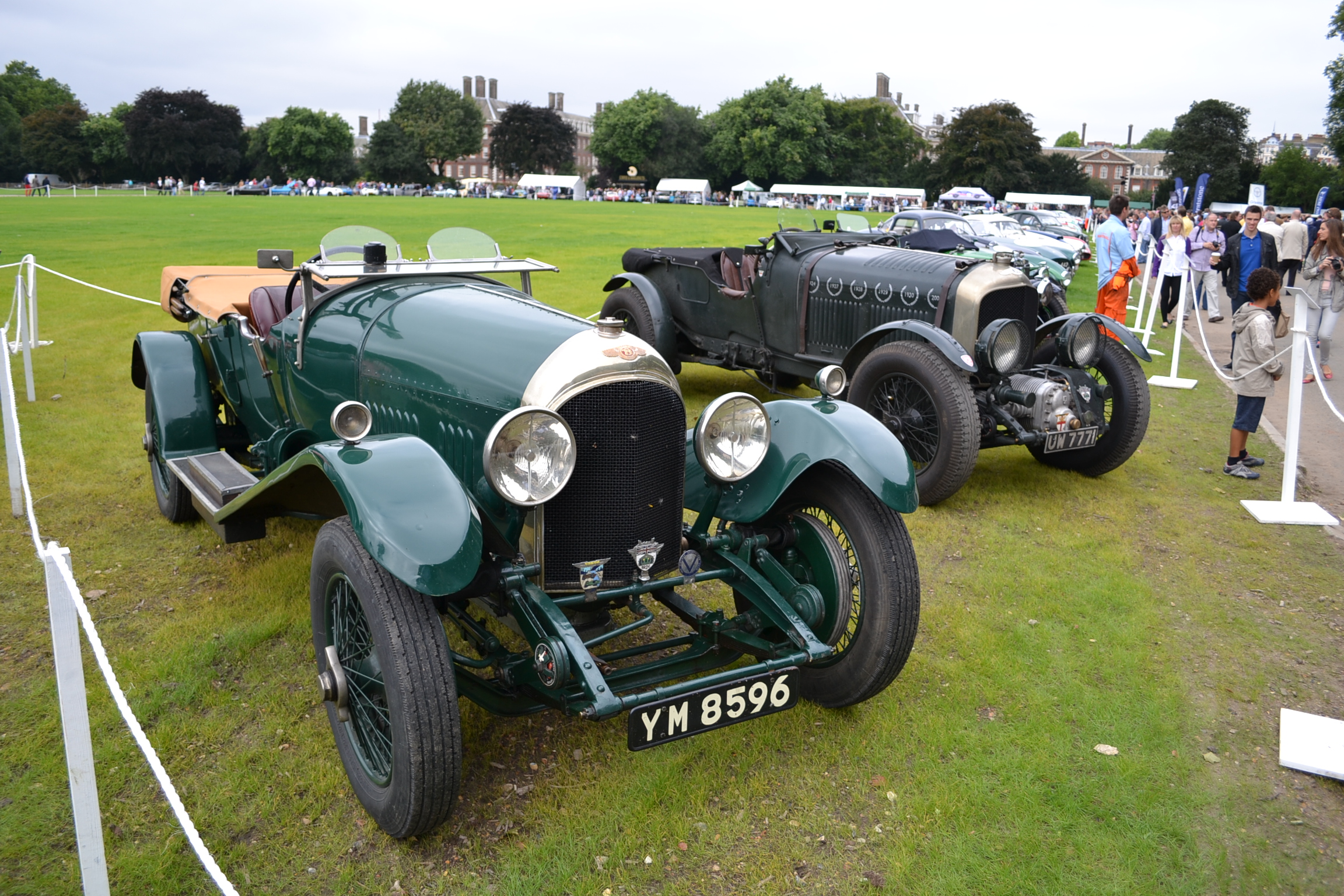
Red label Speed open 2-seater by H J Mulliner 1926

The 3 Litre chassis was shown at the 1919 London Motor Show, but the engine had not yet been finished. It took two years to get the engine right, with the first customer delivery in September 1921. Production lasted through 1929, by which time the car had been surpassed by Bentley's own 4½ Litre car.

- Experimental: 3
- 3 Litre: 1088
- Speed Model: 513
- Super Sports: 18

Car later rebuilt and supercharged

In the winter of 1926/7 the factory's service department created the first supercharged Bentley when chassis number 220 FR5189 had a Roots type blower fitted to its 3-litre engine. This pre-dated the Birkin supercharged Bentleys by two years. Like the later 4½ litre supercharged cars its blower was crankshaft-driven and mounted in front of the radiator between the dumb irons. Unlike them its carburettor was mounted on the left side of the engine block. A rather circuitous intake tract carries the fuel-air mixture forward from there to the blower. On 4½ litre cars the carburettor is mounted on the blower, as commonly done on other supercharged British cars with front-mounted blowers.

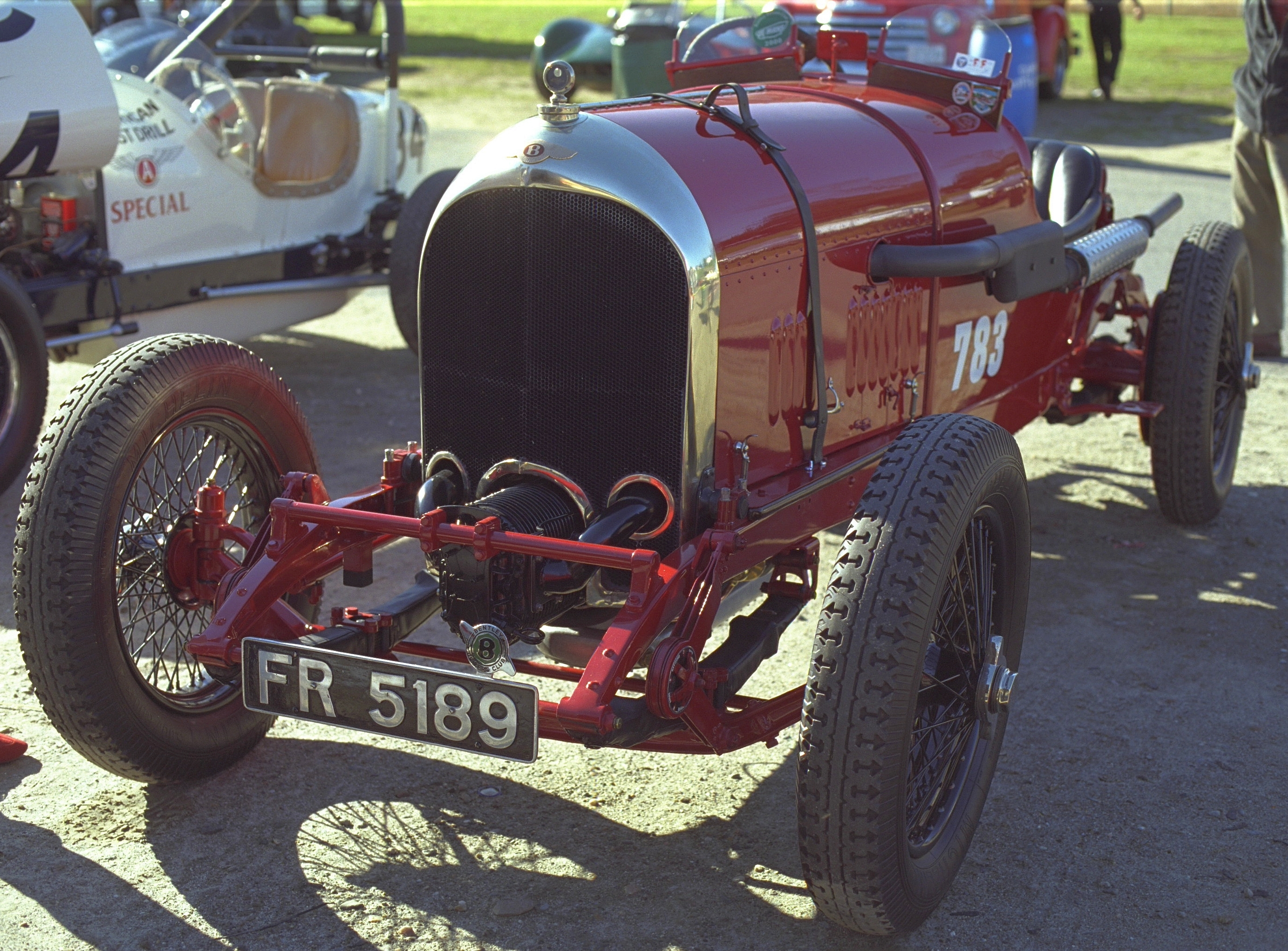
First supercharged Bentley, FR5189

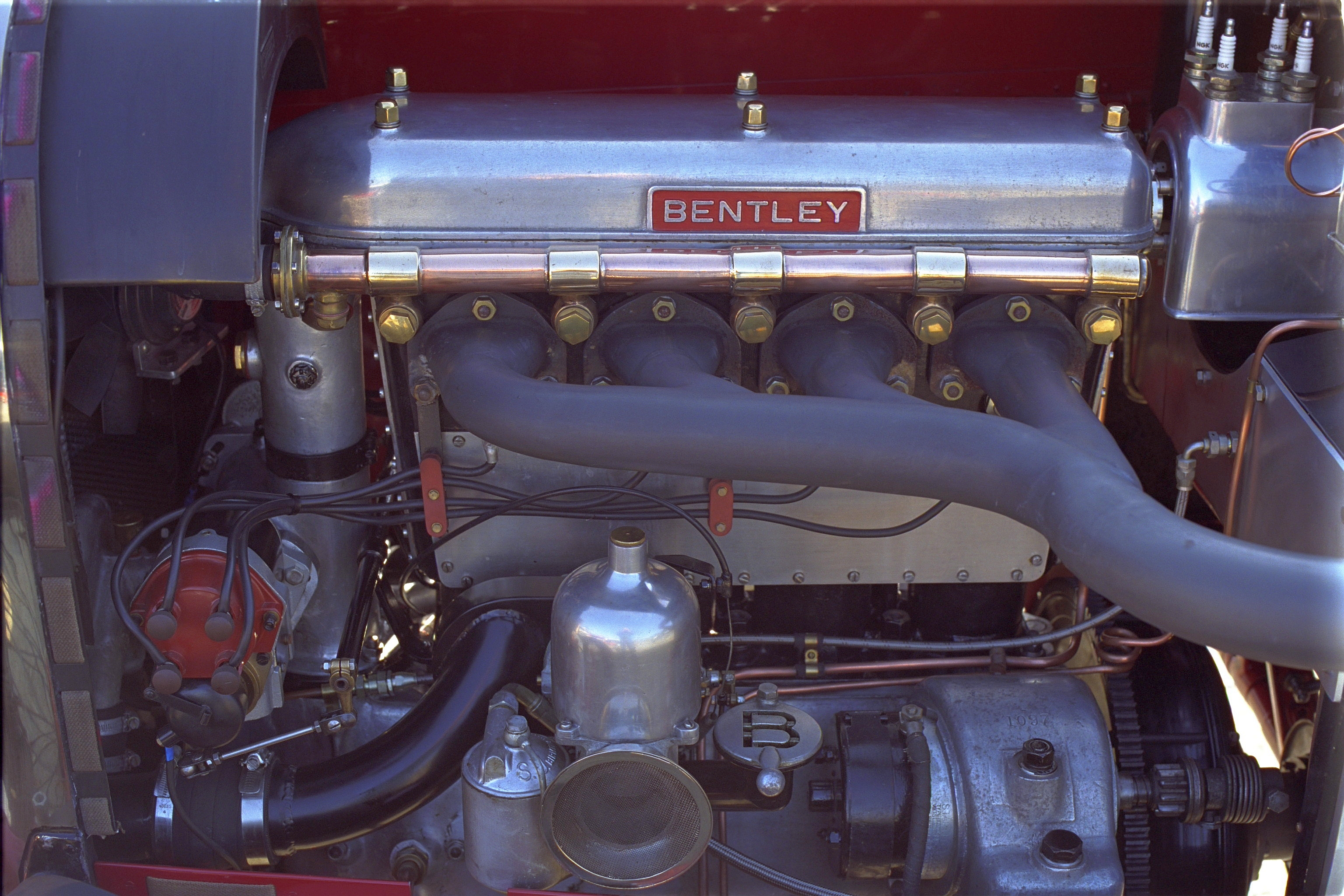
FR5189's Engine

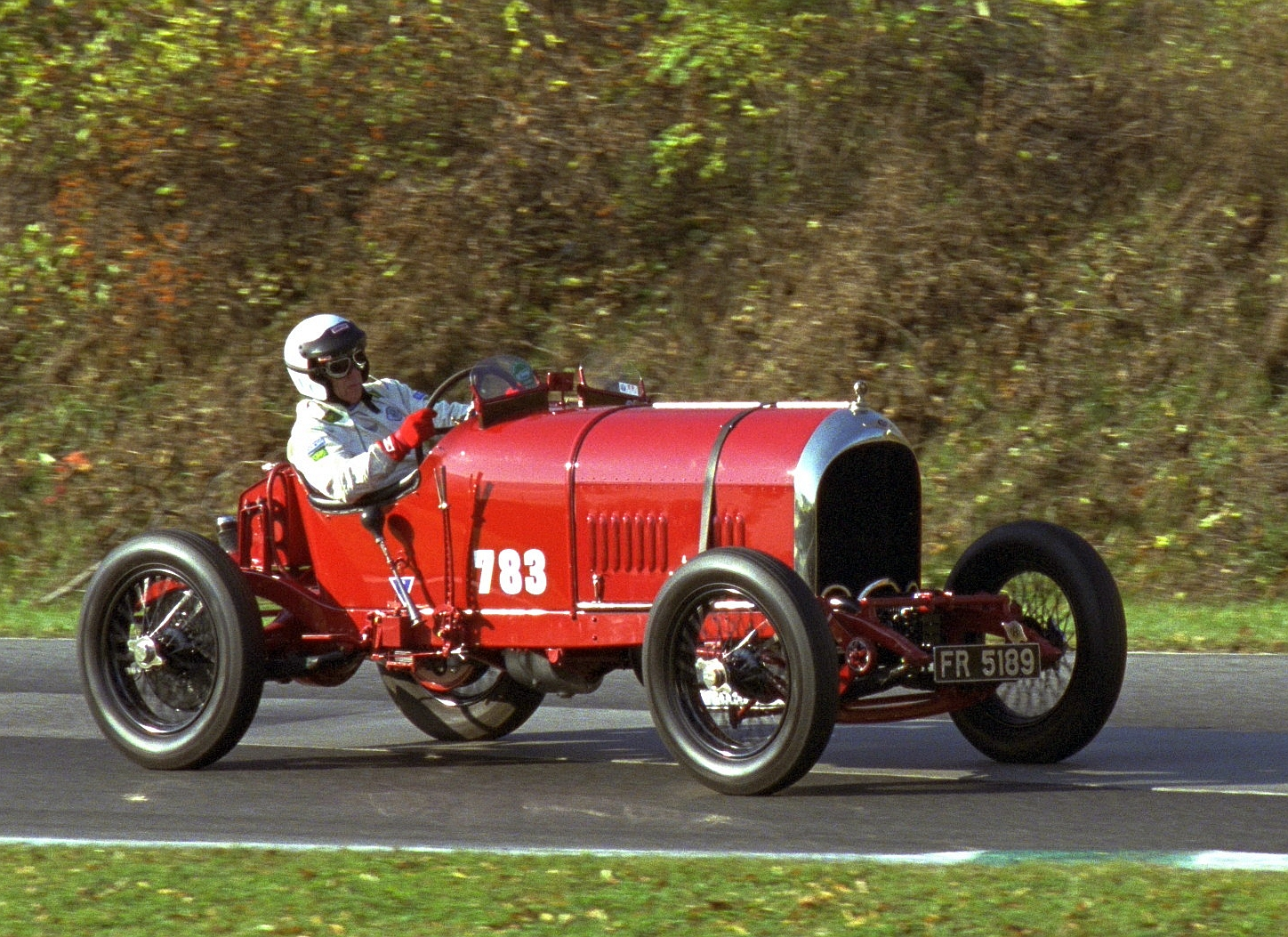
FR5189 at Lime Rock Park

== Survivors ==
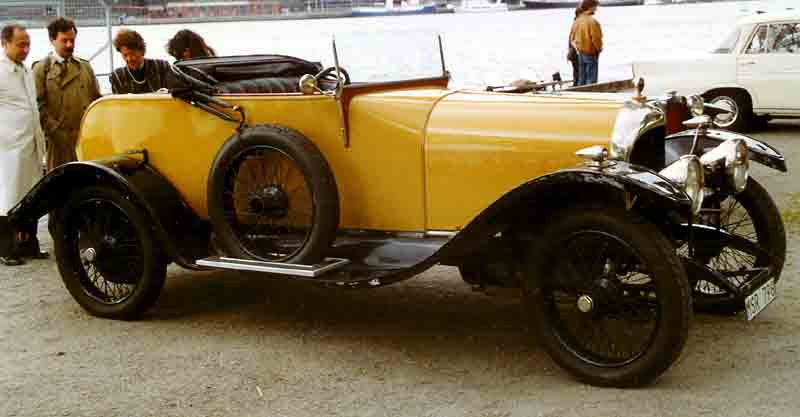
Blue label #19 delivered December 1921

The oldest surviving production Bentley is 3 Litre chassis number 3. The first Bentley sold, it was delivered to its original owner in 1921. Bodied by UK coachbuilder R. Harrison & Son, chassis number 3 has engine number 4 and UK registration AX 3827. In 2011 it sold at auction for $962,500 including buyer's premium.

An original, unrestored 1927 3 Litre Speed Model (Red Label), chassis #1209 DE, is a part of the permanent collection at the Simeone Foundation Automotive Museum in Philadelphia, PA, USA. The car retains all of its original components and is the only Bentley to compete in pre-war road racing competition in the USA.

A 1924 3 Litre has been on display at the Shepparton Motor Museum in Shepparton, Victoria, Australia, since July 2019.

Preceded by Mercedes 60hp	Fastest street-legal production car 160 km/h	Succeeded by Bentley 4½ Litre
