= 1923 24 Hours of Le Mans =

1st 24 Hours of Le Mans endurance race

1923 24 Hours of Le Mans
Previous: None	Next: 1924
Index: Races | Winners

The 1923 24 Hours of Le Mans, officially the 24 Hours Grand Prix of Endurance (French: Grand Prix d'Endurance de 24 Heures), was the inaugural Grand Prix of Endurance, and took place on 26 and 27 May 1923.

A strong field of twenty manufacturers entered, all from France aside from a single Bentley from Great Britain and a pair of Excelsiors from Belgium. In a rain-soaked race it was the Chenard-Walcker team and the Bentley that set the pace, chased by the smaller 2-litre Bignan. The Bentley was delayed by stones smashing a headlight and puncturing the fuel tank, and in the end the Chenard-Walckers of René Léonard / André Lagache and Christian Dauvergne / Raoul Bachmann had a comfortable 1–2 victory.

However, there was no official victory for them as this event was the first part of three consecutive annual races, for the Rudge-Whitworth Triennial Cup, where the ultimate winner would be the manufacturer whose best car exceeded their nominated target distance by the greatest margin. So it was the small 1.1-litre Salmson of Desvaux/Casse that took the lead in that competition. It had completed 98 laps, 46 over its 52-lap target.

The race was also an excellent exhibition of machine endurance and reliability. Thirty cars finished the event, a number not equalled at Le Mans again until 1993.

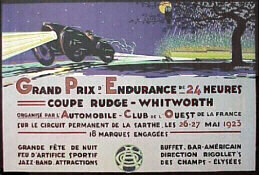
1923 programme cover

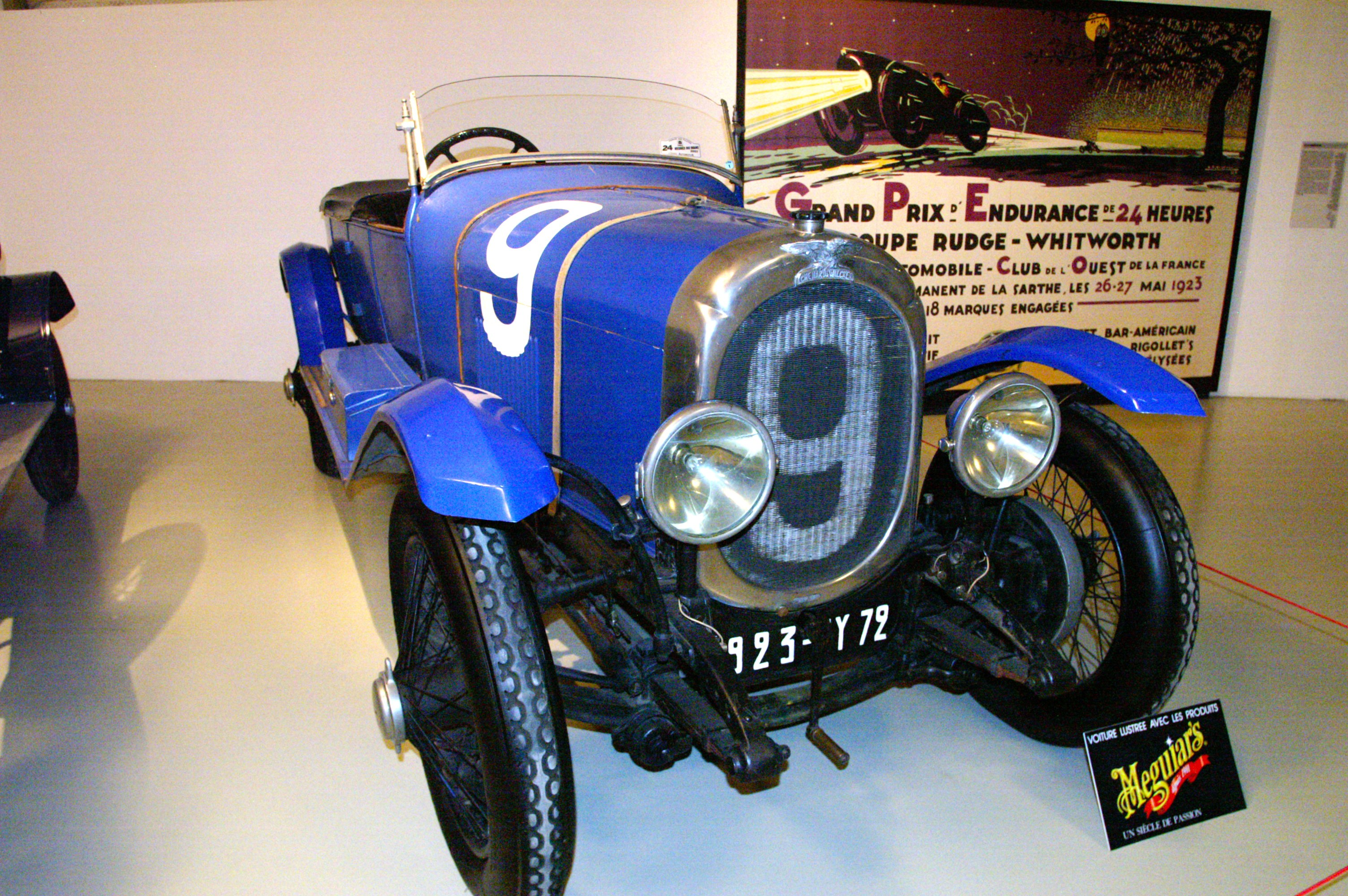
1923 Chenard-Walcker 3-Litre

== Regulations ==
The final regulations for the event were not completed by Charles Faroux and the Automobile Club de l'Ouest (ACO) until February 1923. All cars had to be standard four-seater production models, except those under 1100cc which could be two-seaters where at least thirty cars had been built. The vehicle had to carry 60 kg lead ballast for each passenger space aside from the driver. A maximum of two drivers were allowed (but not riding together), and they alone could replenish the fluids (petrol, oil and water), although there was no minimum distance between refills as in later years. The fuel was to be supplied by the ACO. Engines had to be turned off at pit-stops, and only re-started with an onboard starter.

All cars had to have standard touring equipment, such as wheel wings, hood (if a convertible), running boards, headlights, a rear-view mirror and "warning devices" (horn). None of the entered cars had window-wipers.

There was an hors course rule such that every car had to meet a certain ratio of their minimum distance at the 6, 12, and 18-hour marks or face disqualification. The ratios were 80%, 85% and 90% respectively. The final minimum distances were on a sliding scale based on engine capacity that were kept deliberately lenient for the first race. The distances included the following:

Engine size	Minimum distance	Average speed
6500cc	1600 km	66.67 km/h
4500cc	1500 km	62.5 km/h
3000cc	1350 km	55.25 km/h
2000cc	1200 km	50.0 km/h
1100cc	920 km	38.33 km/h

To encourage future entries and manufacturer commitment to the event, the sponsor, wheel supplier Rudge-Whitworth, put up a trophy for the manufacturer whose best-performing car had completed the furthest distance in 24 hours over three consecutive years. So, in effect, there was no prize for the individual race win. Curiously, the weekend chosen for the event was also when the French moved to "summer time" so clocks were moved forward an hour at 11 pm, therefore the race started at 4 pm Saturday but finished at 5 pm on Sunday.

== Track ==
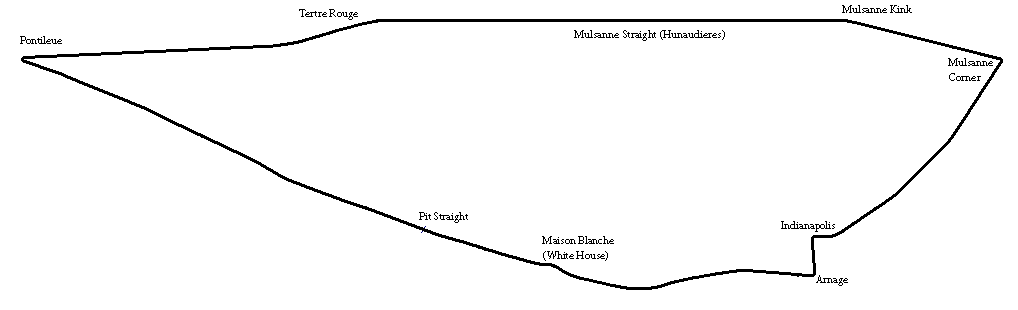
Le Mans in 1923

Automobile racing was well established in the Sarthe region, with races since 1906 with the very first French Grand Prix. The post-war circuit had hosted a number of races since 1920 and was 17.26 km (10.72 mi) in length. From the outskirts of Le Mans city, it ran on the main road southwards to the village of Mulsanne and back. The start/finish line was two-thirds of the back on the return leg on land rented for the event. The depôts (pits) consisted of wooden counters with canvas-roofed areas behind for each car. A race-control tower and two 44m wooden grandstands were built opposite the pits. A footbridge sponsored by Meyrel was built just after the start-line. The track was very narrow in places, including the country roads from Mulsanne to Arnage and from the start-line to Pontlieue hairpin.

For the spectators’ comfort and entertainment through the event, cafés and a dancefloor with jazz-band were set up behind the stands. There was also an area for people to use radios to pick up classical music broadcast from the Eiffel Tower in Paris. Generators provided power for the public address system and lighting around the spectator area, and a long scoreboard was manually maintained giving the cars’ positions and laps completed and target distance.

Although most of the track was fenced from the spectators, the roads were not tar-sealed. Roading engineers were employed before the race to apply a temporary mixture of gravel, dirt and tar to the road surface. Acetylene floodlights from the army were set up at the tight corners of Pontlieue, Mulsanne and Arnage.

== Entries ==
For this first endurance trial there were 37 entries, all submitted by the manufacturers rather than individual drivers. Only the 2-car Avions Voisin team were late scratchings. With the cars all painted in their national racing colours, there was a predominance of French blue cars except for a single green Bentley from Great Britain and two Belgian Excelsiors in yellow. The cars were assigned their numbers in the order of their engine size. Many of the car models were co-identified with the French CV-system of automotive horsepower tax.

Category	Entries	Classes
Very large engines	7	over 3-litre
Large-sized engines	13	2 to 3-litre
Medium-sized engines	7	1.5 to 2-litre
Small-sized engines	10	up to 1.5-litre
Total entrants	37	

The biggest-engined cars in the field were the 5.3-litre Excelsiors, luxury car-makers from Belgium founded in 1903. Success in racing and sales to the Belgian royal family established the company. The 1922 Adex C had a straight-six engine putting out 130 bhp and could reach 145 km/h (90 mph), however its hefty weight impeded its acceleration rate. It had perhaps the first anti-roll bar suspension running on Belgian Englebert tyres. Works drivers, Belgians Nicolas Caerels and André Dills, were pre-war veteran riding mechanics from Grand Prix and Indianapolis.

Lorraine-Dietrich had been founded as a locomotive manufacturer in 1884 in Alsace-Lorraine, moving to automobiles in 1896 entering the early inter-city road-races. At war's-end the factories but soon resumed car production. The B3-6 appeared in 1922 with a straight-6 engine and 3-speed gearbox and three body-style variants were sent to Le Mans under competition director Maurice Leroux. The fastest was the lightened Torpédo bodystyle, capable of almost 145 km/h (90 mph).

Delage was another famous French car company with a strong pre-war motor-racing pedigree already, including winning the 1914 Indianapolis 500, and quickly resumed racing after the war with its big 5- and 6-litre racing cars. The DE raced at Le Mans was a 1-off special of the current popular production model fitted with its engine modified to carry an overhead-valve cylinder head. It was raced by new works driver Paul Torchy and test driver Belbeu.

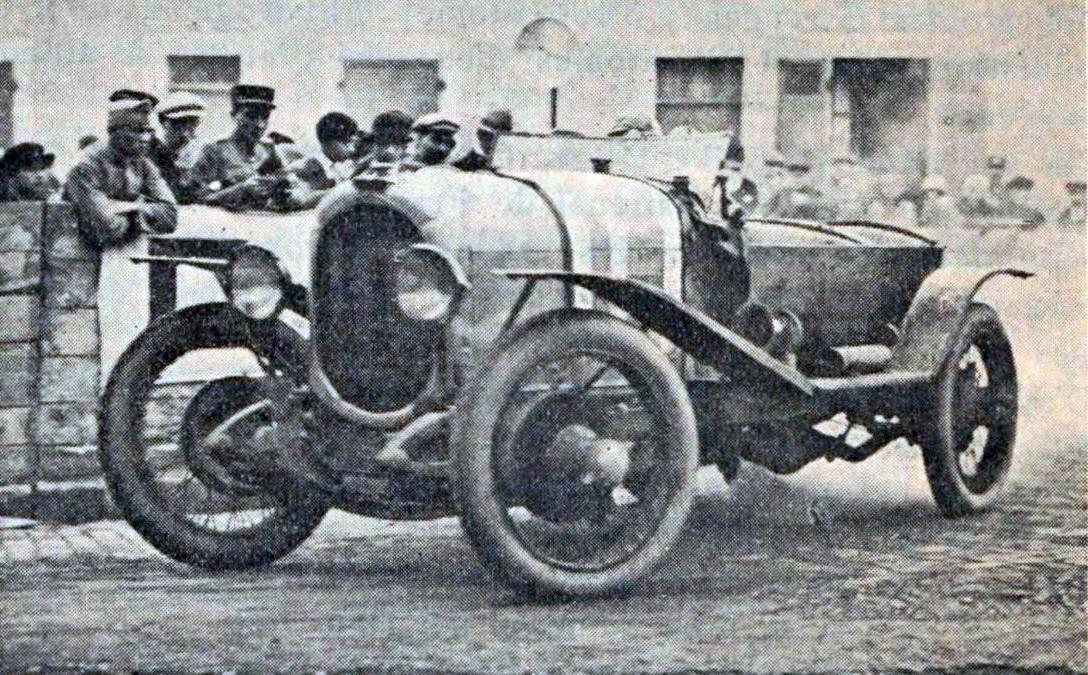
The #10 Chenard-Walcker of Dauvergne and Bachmann

Chenard-Walcker was a major Parisian automotive company, established in 1899 and one of the city's biggest suppliers of taxis. They had a close relationship with coachbuilding company FAR who built their bodywork, led by André Lagache and Raymond Glaszmann (both keen racers). Lucien Chenard, son of the founder, had set up a works racing team in 1921 with the company test-driver René Léonard. Active in post-war racing they sent a trio of cars with the latest Torpédo bodystyle from FAR. Two had the new U3 3-litre engine that put out 90 bhp, driven by Léonard with Lagache, and Glaszmann with Fernand Bachmann. The third car, with a less powerful U2 engine was run by Bachmann's brother Raoul with veteran Christian Dauvergne. They were supported by a well-drilled pit crew to assist the drivers.

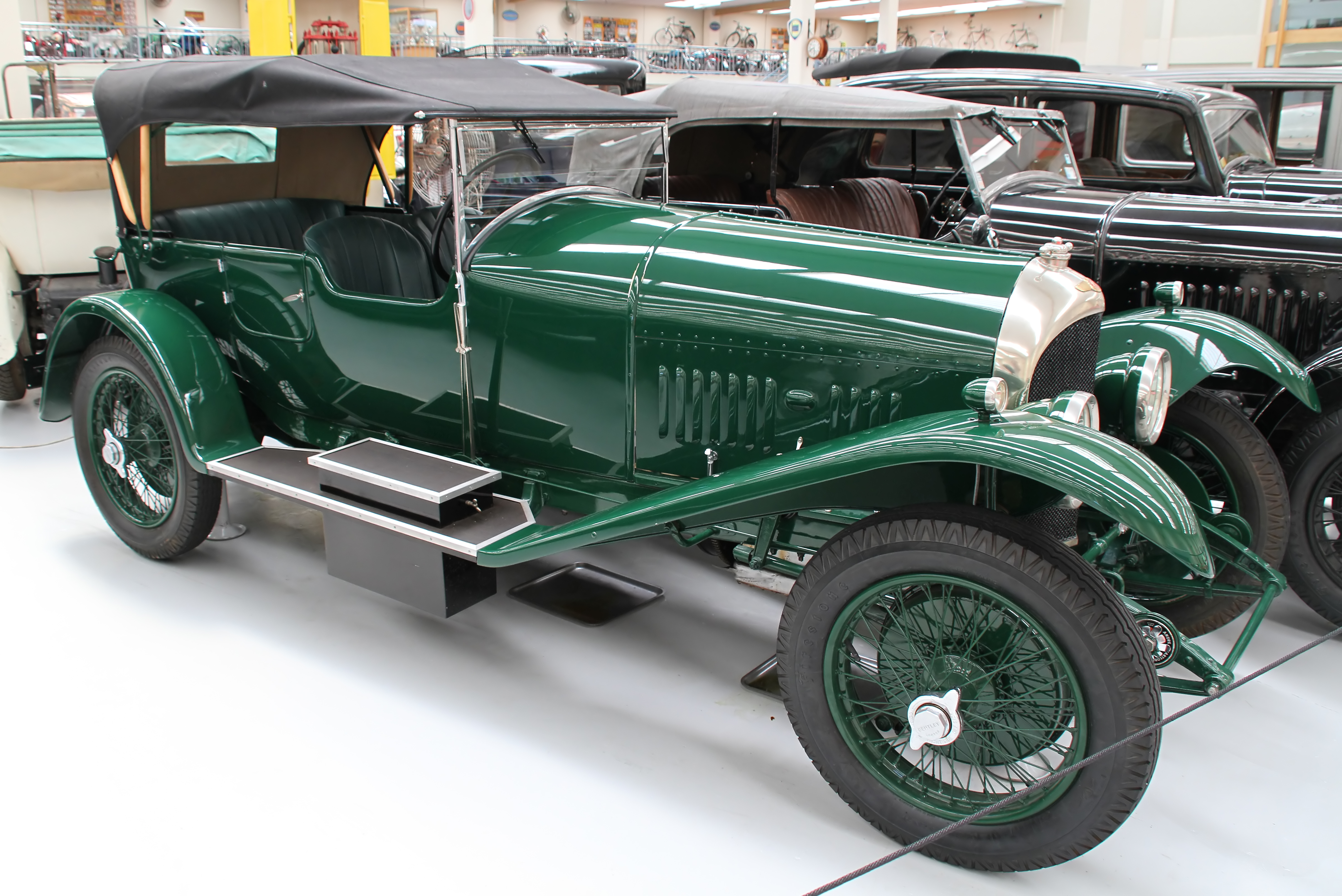
1923 Bentley 3-Litre tourer

The sole British entry was a privately owned Bentley with a small support team from the factory. W. O. Bentley had founded his own company straight after the war in January 1919 and regularly raced his 3-litre Sports. John Duff was Bentley's new London agent, who had set almost 40 international records at Brooklands. He had then broken both ankles there at the end of 1922 when he crashed, going over its banking. Duff's was the first entry received by the ACO for the race. Bentley was not convinced, but released his test driver Frank Clement as co-driver. Duff drove the car to Newhaven then Clement took it to Le Mans, with two Bentley mechanics, their luggage and tools in the back seats. Unlike most other of the leading teams, the Bentley only had rear drum brakes. It ran special long-endurance tyres, designed by Lionel Rapson, convincing Duff he could get away without the weight of carrying a spare wheel.

The biggest entry came from Rolland-Pilain, who presented four cars. The innovative company from Tours was founded in 1905. Émile Pilain filed patents for a hydraulic braking system and a Sleeve valve engine. The four cars were all different. There was the B22 with a Torpédo open-top body and an R Berline saloon. Both had pushrod engines, and hydraulic front brakes with Dunlop tyres. The smaller RP models (Torpédo and Berline variants) had 1.9-litre side-valve engines, cable-brakes on the rear and Michelin tyres.

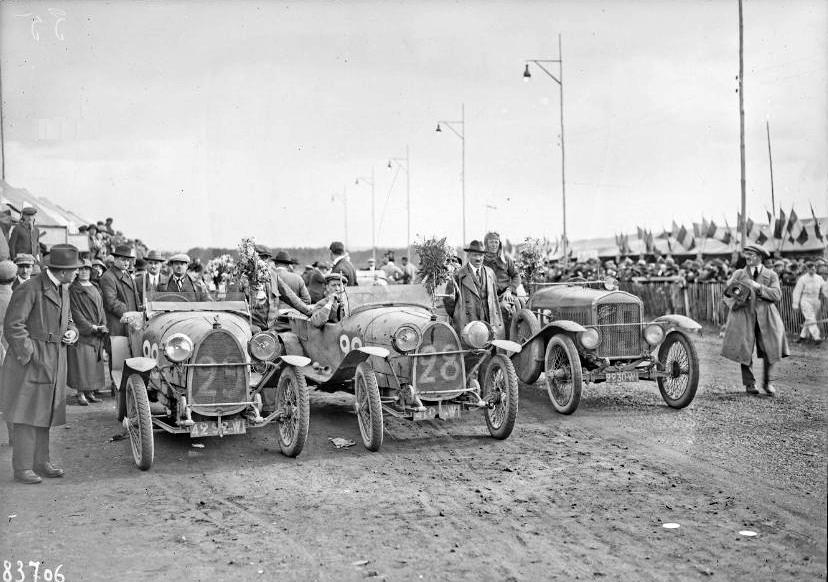
Left to right: The #29 Bugatti of de Pourtalès and de la Rochefoucauld; the #28 Bugatti of Pichard and Marie; and the #19 Montier-Ford Special of Montier and Ouriou

Ford had a major automotive plant at Bordeaux producing around 20,000 cars per year by 1923. Charles Montier was Ford's agent in France and a skilled engineer who specialised in building high-performance specials. His Le Mans entry was based on the abundant Ford Model T with his own engine design and sturdier mechanical parts. Racing his own car, he also added two rear seats hanging over the back of the rear axle to comply with the ACO regulations.

Brasier had a strong racing heritage in the pre-war inter-city races, winning the last two Gordon Bennett Cups in 1904 and 1905. The brand-new TB4 model had a 2062cc engine, 4-speed gearbox and Rudge wheels. In contrast, Marius Berliet had little racing experience and saw Le Mans as a good opportunity to raise his company's profile. His Lyon-based factory had made huge numbers of trucks during the war. Two of the new VH model were at Le Mans, with 2617cc engines, 4-speed gearboxes, and again, Rudge wire-wheels.

Corre La Licorne had grown from the company originally founded by former professional cyclist Jean-Marie Corre. Its cars had raced with moderate success before the war. Two models arrived for the race. The popular B7 tourer with a 2-litre Ballot engine and the new V14 with smaller 1.4-litre SCAP engine. In a similar fashion, Vinot-Deguingand had started building bicycles in 1898 before moving onto voiturettes and then automobiles, raced for the Parisian company by the brothers Léon and Lucien Molon. One of the new BP models, with an 1847cc engine, was brought to Le Mans, again to be driven by the Molon brothers.

Jacques Bignan was a Parisian engineer who expanded and founded his own automobile company in 1918. It was initially subcontracted by Automobiles Grégoire to build cars for British importer Malcolm Campbell. Two of their successful 11CV cars were entered, one with a special Desmodromic valve engine developed by French race-driver Albert Guyot and engineer Némorin Causan. The complex valve-system gave the 2-litre engine 75 bhp instead of 70 bhp but had a far better acceleration curve. It was driven by Paul Gros and Baron de Tornaco.

Georges Irat was a decorated French pilot from the war who moved from being a foreign-car importer in Paris to setting up his own company in 1921 with Maurice Gaultier, an engine designer from Delage. Two of the latest Torpédo-bodied versions of their Type A were entered. The 1995cc engine put out about 50 bhp.

Salmson had been formed in 1890 as a pump and compressor-manufacturer. After being one of the earliest makers of air engines (in 1908), it had been an important French aircraft manufacturer during the war. In 1919, it converted its Paris factories to car and cyclecar production. The works racing team, formed in 1921, had been dominant in the small-engine classes led by former fighter pilot Robert Benoist. Lucien Desvaux, Benoist and Georges Casse had just finished 1–2–3 at the single-driver 24-hour Bol d’Or cyclecar race the weekend before Le Mans. Two VAL-3 voiturettes were entered for Desvaux / Casse and the other regular team driver Luis Ramon Bueno, who drove with Maurice Benoist (Robert's brother).

Bugatti was still a small company, yet to achieve its great fame. Recently relocated back to Molsheim when the Alsace was ceded to France after the war, Ettore Bugatti was still only producing small touring cars. The two T22 "Brescia Bugattis" were privately owned, fitted with the new 1495cc engine capable of 95 km/h (50 mph). However the cars were heavy and further stymied by the 180kg of required passenger-ballast to be carried for a 4-seat car.

SARA was a new Parisian company, only formed a year earlier to build cars based around the pioneering new pressurised air-cooling system of August Tisserant. The new ATS 2-seater model had the only French 4-cylinder air-cooled engine, and produced 30 bhp and two cars were entered. French financier and company co-owner François Piazzoli drove a lightened version without running boards. Amilcar was another new Parisian company formed in 1921 producing small-engined cars and cyclecars. Their CC model won Europe's first 24-hour event at the 1922 Bol d’Or, beating Salmson. An entry to Le Mans was filed at the behest of privateer owners Maurice Boutmy and Jérôme Marcandanti to race the new CV model. The 1004cc engine produced just 18 bhp. But as a 2-seater it was also given the smallest target distance of just 48 laps.

== Practice ==
With no official practice session, some teams (including La Lorraine, Chenard-Walcker and Bignan) arrived earlier in the week before Friday scrutineering to learn the track. For the standing start, the cars were lined up on the front straight two-by-two with engines off. Pictures show them in numerical order, although the "Autocar" review of the time says it was in the order their entries were received by the ACO.

Salmson's race engineer Émile Petit was furious when he arrived at the track to find company director André Lombard had changed the cars’ electrics to a new supplier.

== Race ==
=== Start ===
The early summertime start of the first 24 Hours of Le Mans at 4 pm began just after a hailstorm, in cold rain and wind. The honour to drop the flag to start the race fell to Monsieur Carpé, the ACO chief timekeeper. The big Belgian Excelsiors were overtaken from the start by Robert Bloch's Lorraine-Dietrich. What was supposed to be an "endurance trial" soon became a race along the narrow country roads.

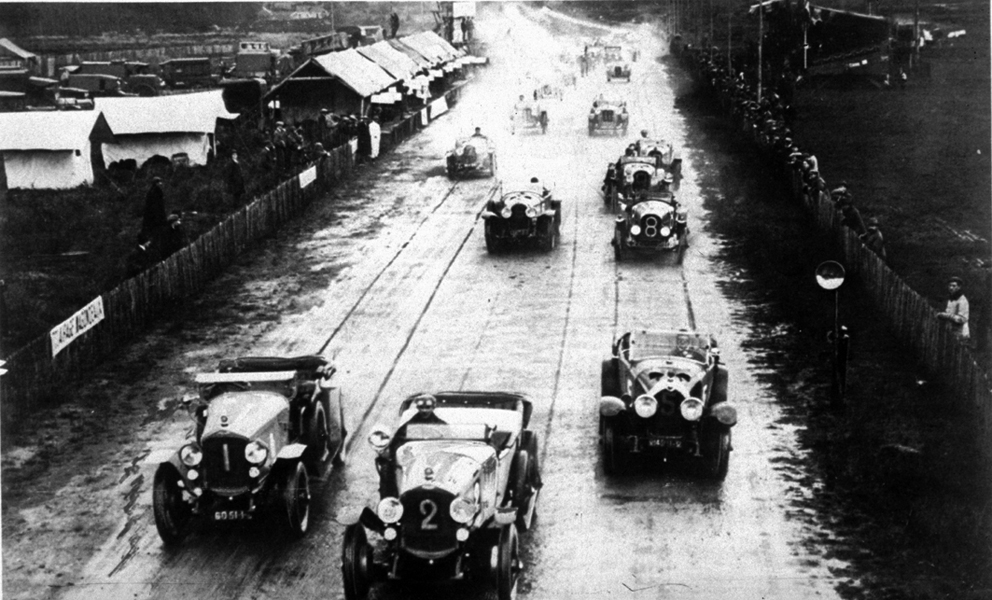
Start of the race

It was perhaps surprising then that throughout the rain that lasted the first four hours, there were no major incidents. It was soon apparent that the quickest cars were the Chenard-Walcker team, the Bentley, one of the Excelsiors, and one of the 2-litre Bignans. The first pitstops for fuel and driver-changes did not start until after 7 pm. The 38-year-old Lagache and veteran Dauvergne bought their Chenard-Walckers in with a good lead. The Belgian-driven Excelsior gradually lost time with its sluggish acceleration rate. After a brief respite the rain and wind returned making for very difficult night-driving, especially as most cars chose not to run with their hoods up, as it compromised top speed and fuel economy. Most drivers were not wearing goggles despite the rain and all the mud-splatter coming off the cars ahead of them.

=== Night ===
The roads were soon getting muddy and rutted. A number of cars had headlamp failures as water got into their acetylene and electrical systems, particularly the two SARAs. Indeed, the lights went out on the Piazzali/Marandet SARA just as it was cornering. Running off the road, it was too badly damaged to continue, becoming the first retirement in the history of the Le Mans 24 Hours. Convoys would form as those cars followed ones with functioning lights. The Chenard drivers were equipped with hand-operated acetylene spotlamps to help with their main lights.

During the night a stone struck René Marie's Bugatti and punctured the fuel tank. The car came to a halt near Arnage and Marie walked the 5km back to the pits. The officials had not anticipated this circumstance in their regulations that fuel could only be added in the pits, as it was accidental rather than a miscalculation. They agreed he would be allowed to carry two fuel tanks back to the car to get it going again. He got back to the pits, made the repairs and was able to continue the race.

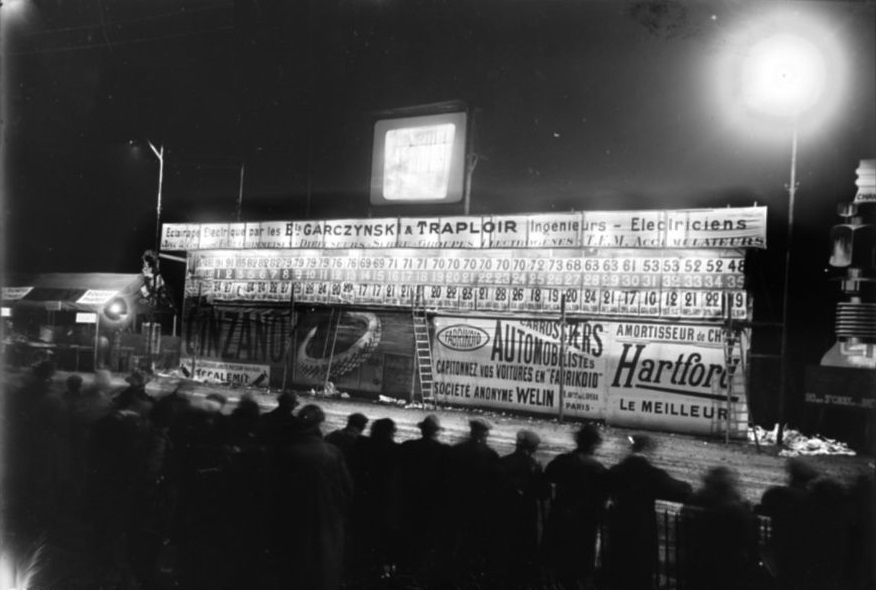
Scoreboard and pit at night. (note the target-lap discrepancy between cars 15, 16, 25 & 26)

Just before midnight the Bentley was delayed by an errant stone smashing a headlamp. Not thinking to bring a spare, the team was sportingly offered one by the Chenard team. But the time needed to fit the lamp was deemed too long and the car continued with just the one. Later in the night, the Bentley had a very near miss avoiding Paul Gros’ Bignan that had burst a tyre approaching Mulsanne corner. Both cars braked hard and swerved onto the grass, ending up only inches apart. Another incident occurred when the French-driven Excelsior went off the road into a sand-trap, taking an hour to dig it out, relatively undamaged.

At the half-way point, at 5 am, the Chenard-Walcker of Léonard/Lagache had a two-lap lead over the Bentley (assisted by their car's better brakes) and the other two Chenards and the Bignan. The rain finally eased off as dawn came.

=== Morning ===
Superior pitwork by their well-drilled team got all three Chenard-Walckers a three-lap lead over the Bentley in the early morning. But as the roads gradually dried out, the Bentley was able to put in quicker lap-times. Lagache and Léonard in turn picked up their pace setting new lap records, even though Duff was able to get one of the laps back.

Then just before midday the Bentley came to a stop at Arnage, after another stone had hit it. Like the Bugatti, the fuel tank had been punctured and the petrol had drained out. Clement walked back to the pits, and using the Bugatti precedent earlier, was allowed to use a gendarme's bicycle with two fuel tanks over his shoulder to refill the Bentley enough to get it back to the pits (and return the bicycle).

=== Finish and post-race ===
It took two and a half hours to get the Bentley back and repaired with a cork in the hole. He then went out and set the fastest lap of the race in the drying conditions. However, the Chenard-Walckers could not be caught and eased off to score a decisive 1–2 victory on distance. Third was the Bignan of Gros/de Tornaco comfortably winning the 2-litre category by 8 laps from its team-mate. But there was a bad incident after the end of the race. Paul Gros left his Bignan and was crossing the circuit to shake the hand of a friend, when he was struck by the car of second-place Raoul Bachmann. Bachmann's was the last car to complete the final lap and when he arrived the finish line was already full of cars and spectators. He braked hard and swerved, and fortunately Gros only suffered a broken arm and bruises.

Fourth equal on distance, having all completed 112 laps were the Bentley, the lead Excelsior driven by the Belgians Caerels and Dills, and the second Bignan of de Marne and Martin.

The Chenard-Walcker of Léonard and Lagache is often cited as the inaugural winner of the Le Mans 24 Hours, which it was on distance. However, the regulations stipulated it was merely the first of three annual races with the winner being the one who exceeded their minimum stipulated by the greatest ratio. In fact, the leader at this first stage of the event (and awarded the Coupe Interim) was the 1.1-litre Salmson of Desvaux and Casse that finished 12th but had exceeded its target distance by 46 laps.

Despite some cars having time-consuming engine issues, only three were not running at the end of the race. Indeed, the 90% finish ratio was the best for many years and it was not until 1993 that as many as 30 cars finished a Le Mans. Despite the weather, it was a record distance for a 24-hour race. The Bentley went through on one set of its Rapson tyres, as did the Berliet, and the smaller Corre-La Licorne was the only tourer to drive with its hood up for the race's duration.

The Rolland-Pillain team caused the scorekeepers some confusion on the Sunday. Firstly, the target laps required that was set on the scoreboard was transposed between the bigger- and smaller-engined cars and then the scorers may have confused the two open-top cars and credited laps by Marinier/Robin to Delalande/Marguenat. Or the bigger-engine cars in the team were assigned the lower numbers by mistake. Despite issues with leaks from the hydraulic brake system, all four cars reached their target distances. Similarly, the leading Bugatti apparently covered an impossible number of laps on Sunday afternoon (to complete 40 laps in the same time as the leader only managed 32), credited for laps at the expense of the delayed Pichard/Marie team car.

The Georges-Irat team had requested the ACO to monitor their fuel consumption through the race, and officials came back with figures of 32.7 mpg_{‑imp} (8.6 L/100 km; 27.2 mpg_{‑US}) for their best-finishing car. By contrast, the SARA that covered the least distance in the 24 hours had an economy of 47 mpg (6.0 litres/100km). Excelsior were not convinced they could win the Coupe Rudge-Whitworth and did not return, however they had further success in their local endurance race, the Spa 24 Hours. Delage also would not return for over a decade, choosing instead to concentrate on a new Grand Prix racing team.

After the major argument at Salmson before the race, Lombard left the company and the successful race-team was disbanded at the end of the year. Although now well-placed to win the Triennial Cup, they would not return until 1926.

Repusseau & Cie, French agents for the American Hartford Suspension Company, had set up a dining area for the drivers and pit crews. They later reported that 150 gallons of onion soup, 50 chickens, 450 bottles of champagne (and an unspecified quantity of red and white wine) had been consumed over the weekend by the racing personnel.

== Official results ==
=== Finishers ===
Results taken from Quentin Spurring's book, officially licensed by the ACO Although there were no official engine classes, the highest finishers in unofficial categories aligned with the Index targets are in Bold text.

Pos	Class (Note: There were no official class divisions for this race. These are unofficial categories (used in subsequent years) related to the Index targets.)	No.	Team	Drivers	Chassis	Engine	Tyre	Laps
1	**3.0**	**9**	**(France) Chenard-Walcker SA**	**(France) André Lagache** **(France) René Léonard**	Chenard-Walcker Type U3 15CV Sport	Chenard-Walcker 3.0L S4	**M**	**128**
2	3.0	10	(France) Chenard-Walcker SA	(France) Christian Dauvergne (France) Raoul Bachmann	Chenard-Walcker Type U3 15CV Sport	Chenard-Walcker 3.0L S4	**M**	124
3	**2.0**	**23**	**(France) Établissements Industriels**; **Jacques Bignan**	**(Belgium) Baron Raymond de Tornaco** **(France) Paul Gros**	Bignan 11CV ‘Desmo’ Sport	Bignan 1979cc S4	**E**	120
4=	**8.0**	**2**	**(Belgium) Automobiles Excelsior SA**	**(Belgium) Nicolas Caerels** **(Belgium) André Dills**	Excelsior Adex C	Excelsior 5.3L S6	**E**	112
4=	3.0	8	(United Kingdom) Bentley Motors Limited	(Canada) Capt John Duff (United Kingdom) Frank Clement	Bentley 3 Litre Sport	Bentley 3.0L S4	Rapson	112
4=	2.0	24	(France) Établissements Industriels; Jacques Bignan	(France) Philippe de Marne (France) Jean Martin	Bignan 11CV Sport	Bignan 1979cc S4	**E**	112
7	3.0	11	(France) Chenard-Walcker SA	(France) Raymond Glaszmann (France) Fernand Bachmann	Chenard-Walcker Type U2 15CV Tourisme	Chenard-Walcker 3.0L S4	**M**	110
8	**5.0**	**7**	**(France) Société Lorraine De Dietrich** **et Cie**	**(France) André Rossignol** **(France) Gérard de Courcelles**	Lorraine-Dietrich B3-6 Sport [15CV]	Lorraine-Dietrich 3.4L S6	**E**	108
9	8.0	1	(Belgium) Automobiles Excelsior SA	(France) Gonzaque Lécureul (France) . Flaud	Excelsior Adex C	Excelsior 5.3L S6	**E**	106
10	**1.5**	**29**	**(France) Automobiles Ettore Bugatti**	**(France) Comte Max de Pourtalès** **(France) Vicomte Sosthene de la Rochefoucauld**	Bugatti T22	Bugatti 1495cc S4	**E**	104
11	3.0	17	(France) Société des Automobiles Brasier	(France) Eugène Verpault (France) . Migeot	Brasier TB4 [12CV]	Brasier 2.1L S4	**D**	99
12=	3.0	16	(France) Automobiles Delage SA	(France) Paul Torchy (France) . Belbeu	Delage DE 2 Litre Sport	Delage 2.1L S4	**M**	98
12=	**1.1**	**34**	**(France) Société des Moteurs Salmson**	**(France) Lucien Desvaux** **(France) Georges Casse**	Salmson VAL-3	Salmson1086cc S4	**E**	98
14	3.0	19	(France) Établissements Charles Montier et Cie	(France) Charles Montier (France) Albert Ouriou	Ford-Montier	Ford 2008cc S4	**M**	97
15=	2.0	21	(France) Automobiles Georges Irat	(France) Jean Dourianou (France) M. Cappé	Georges Irat Type 4A Sport	Georges Irat 1995cc S4	**E**	93
15=	1.1	33	(France) Société des Moteurs Salmson	(France) Luis Ramon Bueno (France) Maurice Benoist	Salmson VAL-3	Salmson1086cc S4	**E**	93
17	3.0	14 / (26*)	(France) Etablissements Automobiles; Rolland et Pilain SA	(France) Gaston Delalande (France) Jean de Marguenat	Rolland-Pilain B22 Sport	Rolland-Pilain 2.3L S4	**D**	92
18	1.1	35	(France) Société Nouvelle de l'Automobile Amilcar	(France) Maurice Boutmy (France) Jérôme Marcandanti	Amilcar CV	Amilcar 1004cc S4	**E**	89
19=	5.0	5	(France) Société Lorraine De Dietrich et Cie	(France) Robert Bloch (France) Henri Stalter	Lorraine-Dietrich B3-6 Sport [15CV]	Lorraine-Dietrich 3.4L S6	**E**	88
19=	3.0	12	(France) Automobiles Marius Berliet SA	(Switzerland) Édouard Probst (France) . Redon	Berliet VH 12CV	Berliet 2.6L S4	**M**	88
21	3.0	15 / (25*)	(France) Etablissements Automobiles; Rolland et Pilain SA	(France) Georges Guignard (France) Louis Sire	Rolland-Pilain R Berline	Rolland-Pilain 2.2L S4	**D**	84
22	1.5	28	(France) Automobiles Ettore Bugatti	(France) Louis Pichard (France) René Marie	Bugatti T22	Bugatti 1495cc S4	**E**	82
23=	2.0	25 / (15*)	(France) Etablissements Automobiles; Rolland et Pilain SA	(France) Jean Pouzet (France) Edmond Pichon	Rolland-Pilain RP23 Berline	Rolland-Pilain 1924cc S4	**M**	80
23=	2.0	26 / (14*)	(France) Etablissements Automobiles; Rolland et Pilain SA	(France) Jules Robin (France) Gérard Marinier	Rolland-Pilain RP23 Sport	Rolland-Pilain 1924cc S4	**M**	80
23=	1.5	30	(France) Societe Française des Automobiles Corre	(France) Louis Balart (France) Charles Drouin	Corre La Licorne V14 8CV	SCAP 1393cc S4	**E**	80
26	2.0	27	(France) Société des Anciens; Ateliers Vinot-Deguingand	(France) Léon Molon (France) Lucien Molon	Vinot-Deguingand BP 10CV	Vinot-Deguingand 1847cc S4	**M**	77
27	3.0	18	(France) Société des Automobiles Brasier	(France) Léopold Jouguet (France) . Maillon	Brasier TB4 [12CV]	Brasier 2.1L S4	**D**	76
28	2.0	20	(France) Societe Française des Automobiles Corre	(France) Albert Colomb (France) Waldemar Lestienne	Corre La Licorne B7 12CV	Ballot 2001cc S4	**E**	74
29	2.0	22	(France) Automobiles Georges Irat	(France) Pierre Malleveau (France) . Milhaud	Georges Irat Type 4A Sport	Georges Irat 1995cc S4	**E**	73
30	1.1	32	(France) SSociété des Automobiles à Refroidissements par Air	(France) Lucien Erb (France) Robert Battagliola	SARA ATS [7CV]	SARA 1098cc S4	**D**	57

- Note: confusion exists over which cars were numbered as what.

=== Did not finish ===
Pos	Class	No	Team	Drivers	Chassis	Engine	Tyre	Laps	Reason
DNF	5.0	6	(France) Société Lorraine De Dietrich et Cie	(France) Henri Stoffel (France) Rene Labouchère	Lorraine-Dietrich B3-6 Sport [15CV]	Lorraine-Dietrich 3.4L S6	**E**	50	Not stated
DNF	3.0	13	(France) Automobiles Marius Berliet SA	(France) Roland Jacquot (France) Georges Ribail	Berliet VH 12CV	Berliet 2.6L S4	**M**	44	Engine
DNF	1.1	31	(France) Société des Automobiles à Refroidissements par Air	(France) François Piazzoli (France) André Marandet	SARA ATS [7CV]	SARA 1098cc S4	**D**	14	Accident
Sources: (Note: Some of the final finisher positions are disputed from the official results.)

=== Did not start ===
Pos	Class	No	Team	Drivers	Chassis	Engine	Tyre	Reason
DNA	5.0	3	(France) Avions Voisin		Voisin C5	Voisin 4.0L S4		Did not arrive
DNA	5.0	4	(France) Avions Voisin		Voisin C5	Voisin 4.0L S4		Did not arrive

=== Interim Coupe Triennale Rudge-Whitworth positions ===
Pos	Class	No.	Team	Drivers	Chassis	Laps	Target Laps	Ratio exceeded
1	1.1	34	(France) Société des Moteurs Salmson	(France) Lucien Desvaux (France) Georges Casse	Salmson VAL-3	98	52	188.5%
2	1.1	35	(France) Société Nouvelle de l'Automobile Amilcar	(France) Maurice Boutmy (France) Jérôme Marcandanti	Amilcar CV	89	48	185.4%
3	1.1	33	(France) Société des Moteurs Salmson	(France) Luis Ramon Bueno (France) Maurice Benoist	Salmson VAL-3	93	52	178.8%
4	2.0	23	(France) Établissements Industriels; Jacques Bignan	(Belgium) Baron Raymond de Tornaco (France) Paul Gros	Bignan 11CV ‘Desmo’ Sport	120	70	171.4%
5	1.5	29	(France) Automobiles Ettore Bugatti	(France) Comte Max de Pourtalès (France) Vicomte Sosthene de la Rochefoucauld	Bugatti T22	104	63	165.1%
6	3.0	9	(France) Chenard-Walcker SA	(France) André Lagache (France) René Léonard	Chenard-Walcker Type U3 15CV Sport	128	79	162.0%
7	2.0	24	(France) Établissements Industriels; Jacques Bignan	(France) Philippe de Marne (France) Jean Martin	Bignan 11CV Sport	112	70	160.0%
8	3.0	10	(France) Chenard-Walcker SA	(France) Christian Dauvergne (France) Raoul Bachmann	Chenard-Walcker Type U3 15CV Sport	124	79	157.0%
9	3.0	8	(United Kingdom) Bentley Motors Limited	(Canada) Capt John Duff (United Kingdom) Frank Clement	Bentley 3 Litre Sport	112	79	141.8%
10	3.0	17	(France) Société des Automobiles Brasier	(France) Eugène Verpault (France) . Migeot	Brasier TB4	99	71	139.4%

- Note: Only the top ten positions are included in this set of standings.

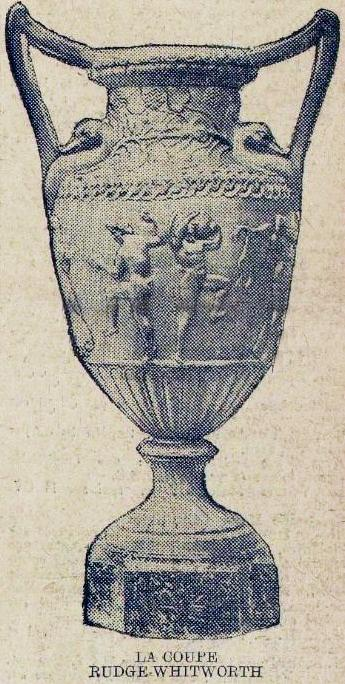
The Rudge-Whitworth Triennial Cup

=== Highest finisher in class ===
Class	Winning car	Winning drivers
5 to 8-litre	No. 2 Excelsior Adex C	Caerels / Dills *
3 to 5-litre	No. 7 L Lorraine-Dietrich B3-6 Sport	Rossignol / de Courcelles *
2 to 3-litre	No. 9 Chenard-Walcker U3 Sport	Lagache / Léonard *
1500 to 2000cc	No. 23 Bignan 11CV Desmo Sport	De Tornaco / Gros *
1100 to 1500cc	No. 28 Bugatti T22	De Pourtalès / De la Rochefoucauld *
750 to 1100cc	No. 34 Salmson VAL-3	Desvaux / Casse *

- Note: setting a new class distance record.

With no official class divisions, these are the highest finishers in unofficial categories aligned with the Index targets.

=== Statistics ===
Taken from Quentin Spurring's book, officially licensed by the ACO

- Fastest Lap – F. Clement, No. 8 Bentley 3-litre – 9:39secs; 107.33 km/h (66.69 mph)
- Longest Distance – 2,209.54 km (1,372.94 mi)
- Greatest Average Speed
  on Distance – 92.06 km/h (57.20 mph)

Citations
