= René Léonard =

French racing driver of the 1920s

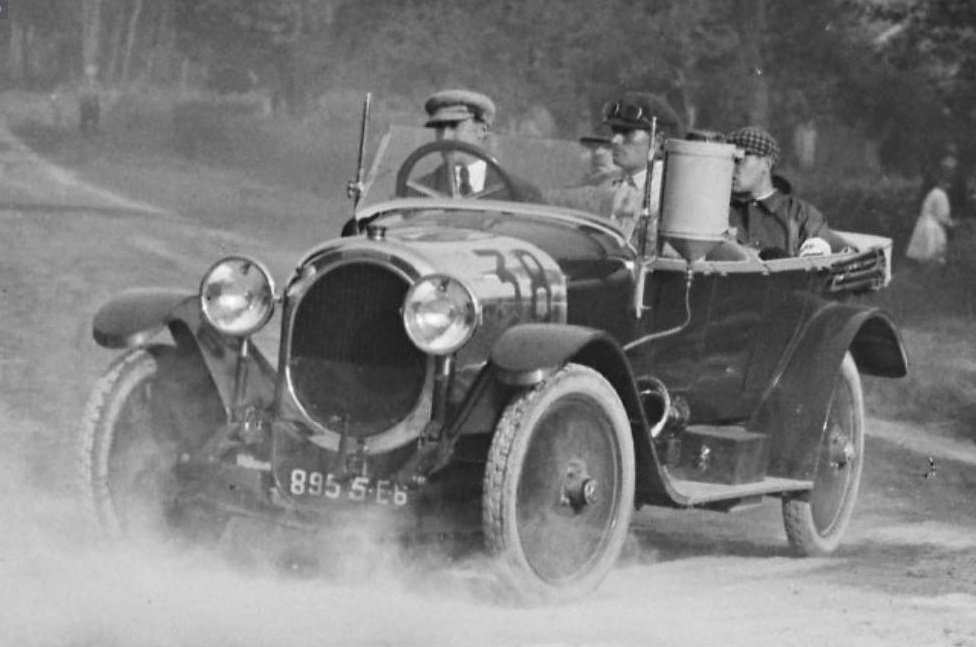
- René Léonard driving a Chenard et Walcker in the Grand Prix de la consommation de l'Automobile-Club de l'Ouest, 28 May 1922
- Nationality: (France) French
- Born: René Auguste Maxime Léonard; 23 June 1889; Pau, Pyrénées-Atlantiques
- Died: 15 August 1965 (aged 76); Saint-Gratien, Val-d'Oise

24 Hours of Le Mans career
- Years: 1923–1925
- Teams: Chenard et Walcker
- Best finish: 1st (1923)
- Class wins: 1 (1923)

René Auguste Maxime Léonard (23 June 1889 – 15 August 1965) was a French racing driver who, along with André Lagache, won the inaugural running of the 24 Hours of Le Mans in 1923.

== Career ==
Léonard and Lagache were both engineers for the Chenard et Walcker automobile company, and were chosen to drive one of the three entries in the endurance event. Their "Sport" model finished by a four lap margin over another Chenard et Walcker. They drove together the next two years, but failed to finish either time.

Driving for Chenard et Walcker, Léonard won the Coupe Georges Boillot in 1924. He drove with Lagache to win the second edition of the Spa 24 Hours in 1925, and the pair also finished third in 1926. Léonard won the 1926 Gran Premio de Turismo, a 12-hour race for touring cars held at Circuito Lasarte in Guipúzcoa, Spain.

Following the 1926 season, Chenard et Walcker withdrew from competition. However, in 1932, he was seen driving one of their cars in the Lisieux hillclimb and a one-kilometre race in Strasbourg. The same year, he moved to Saint-Gratien to be near to the company's factory. For the 1937 24 Hours of Le Mans, he managed a private team of Chenard-Walckers owned by Benoît Falchetto and fielded by Yves Giraud-Cabantous.

== Racing record ==
=== Complete 24 Hours of Le Mans results ===
Year	Team	Co-Drivers	Car	Class	Laps	Pos.	Class Pos.
1923	(France) Chenard-Walcker SA	(France) André Lagache	Chenard-Walcker; Type U3 15CV Sport	3.0	128	1st	1st
1924	(France) Chenard-Walcker SA	(France) André Lagache	Chenard-Walcker; Type U 22CV Sport	5.0	26	DNF (Fire)	
1925	(France) Chenard-Walcker SA	(France) André Lagache	Chenard-Walcker; Type U 22CV Sport	5.0	90	DNF (Engine)	

Sporting positions
Preceded by None	Winner of the 24 Hours of Le Mans; 1923 with: André Lagache	Succeeded by John Duff; Frank Clement
