= André Lagache =

20th-century French racing driver

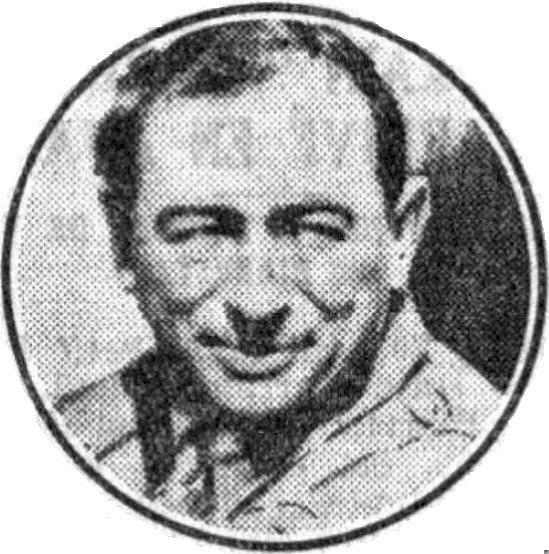
- Nationality: (France) French
- Born: André Ernest Paul Lagache; 21 January 1885; Pantin, Île-de-France
- Died: 2 October 1938 (aged 53); Satory, Île-de-France

24 Hours of Le Mans career
- Years: 1923–1925
- Teams: Chenard et Walcker
- Best finish: 1st (1923)
- Class wins: 1 (1923)

André Ernest Paul Lagache (21 January 1885 – 2 October 1938) was a French racing driver who, along with René Léonard, won the inaugural 24 Hours of Le Mans in 1923.

== Career ==
Lagache and Léonard were engineers at automobile manufacturer Chenard et Walcker, and were chosen to drive their "Sport" model in the inaugural 24 Hours of Le Mans. The duo drove a distance of 2,209 km (1,373 mi) over 24 hours and beat another Chenard-Walcker by a four lap margin. Lagache continued to run Le Mans for Chenard et Walcker for the next two years, but was unable to finish the event again.

Lagache also raced a Chenard-Walcker in the inaugural Spa 24 Hours in 1924, finishing second alongside André Pisart. He returned with Léonard to win the event in 1925, and finished third with Léonard in 1926.

Lagache won the Coupe Georges Boillot in 1925 and 1926.

He was one of the founders of the tractor manufacturer FAR, and supplied the A to the company name. He was killed in an accident while demonstrating a vehicle in front of army officials in 1938.

== Racing record ==
=== Complete 24 Hours of Le Mans results ===
Year	Team	Co-Drivers	Car	Class	Laps	Pos.	Class Pos.
1923	(France) Chenard-Walcker SA	(France) René Léonard	Chenard-Walcker; Type U3 15CV Sport	3.0	128	1st	1st
1924	(France) Chenard-Walcker SA	(France) René Léonard	Chenard-Walcker; Type U 22CV Sport	5.0	26	DNF (Fire)	
1925	(France) Chenard-Walcker SA	(France) René Léonard	Chenard-Walcker; Type U 22CV Sport	5.0	90	DNF (Engine)	

Sporting positions
Preceded by None	Winner of the 24 Hours of Le Mans; 1923 with: René Léonard	Succeeded by John Duff; Frank Clement
