= Chenard-Walcker =

Automobile manufacturer

Chenard & Walcker Chenard-Walcker
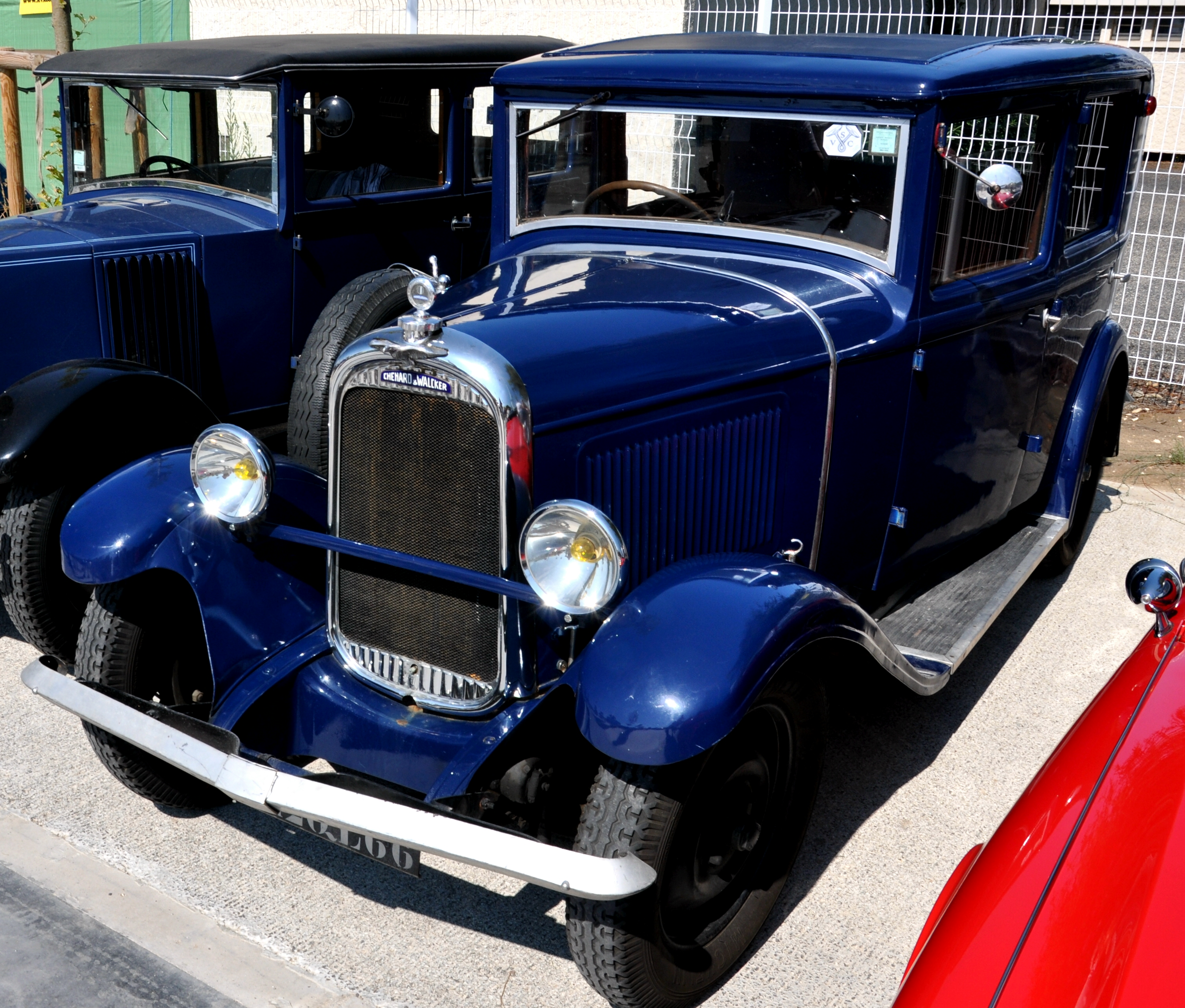

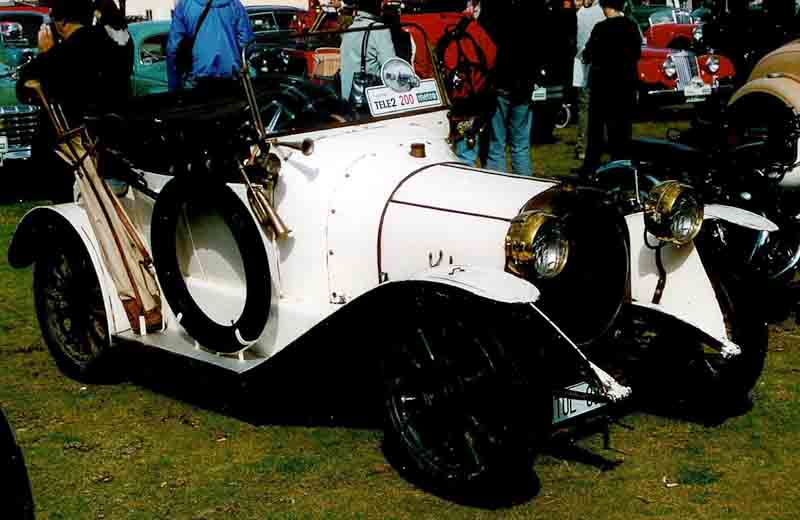
- Chenard-Walcker T2 1913
- Industry: manufacture of motor vehicles vehicle construction
- Founded: 19 January 1899; Registered 1900 as Chenard, Walcker et Compagnie; Registered 1906 as Société Anonyme des Anciens Étabissements Chenard et Walcker
- Defunct: 1946
- Fate: Purchased by Chausson in 1936 following bankruptcy, after which the name continued to be used into the mid-1940s
- Headquarters: Asnières-sur-Seine, France (1899 - 1908); Gennevilliers, France (1908 - 1946)
- Key people: Ernest Chenard (1861–1922); Henri Walcker (1877–1912); Lucien Chenard (1896–1971)
- Products: Automobiles; Commercial vehicles

Chenard-Walcker, also known as Chenard & Walcker, was a French automobile and commercial vehicle manufacturer from 1898 to 1946. Chenard-Walcker then designed and manufactured trucks marketed via Peugeot sales channels until the 1970s. The factory was at first in Asnières-sur-Seine moving to Gennevilliers in 1906. The make is remembered as the winner of the first Le Mans 24 Hours Race in 1923.

== History ==
Ernest Chenard (1861–1922) was a railway engineer and maker of bicycles with a factory in the rue de Normandie at Asnières-sur-Seine, then just outside Paris on its north side. He joined with mining engineer Henri Walcker (1877–1912) in 1898 to make motor tricycles. Together they founded their automobile business on 19 January 1899, with Chenard in charge of design and Walcker sales and finance. The business was formally registered as Chenard, Walcker et Compagnie in 1900. In order to ensure short-term commercial viability they started out producing a quadricycle, but in 1900 their "first true automobile", the "Chenard et Walcker Type A" was homologated with the authorities. This had a two-cylinder, 1,160 cc (71 cu in) engine of their own design which drove the rear wheels through a four-speed gearbox and an unusual transmission system. From the gearbox there were two drive shafts, one to each rear hub, with the hubs driven by gear teeth cut on the inside. The car was shown at the 1901 Paris Salon. The "Chenard et Walcker Type B" followed in 1901 and a fuller range was very soon on offer.

In March 1906 the company went public, in the process being renamed as the Société Anonyme des Anciens Étabissements Chenard et Walcker, and moved to a new factory at Gennevilliers in 1908. The new name has caused confusion over the years as to whether the cars should be called Chenard-Walcker or Chenard et Walcker. Both names seem to have been used. Annual production steadily increased with a major market being the supply of taxis especially in Paris. In 1910 they made over 1500 cars making them the ninth largest car maker in France. A six-cylinder car of 4.5-litre (270 cu in) joined the line up in 1913 and at the outbreak of war in 1914 the model range consisted of the six-cylinder and fours of 2.0-litre (120 cu in), 2.6-litre (160 cu in) and 3-litre (180 cu in) capacities.

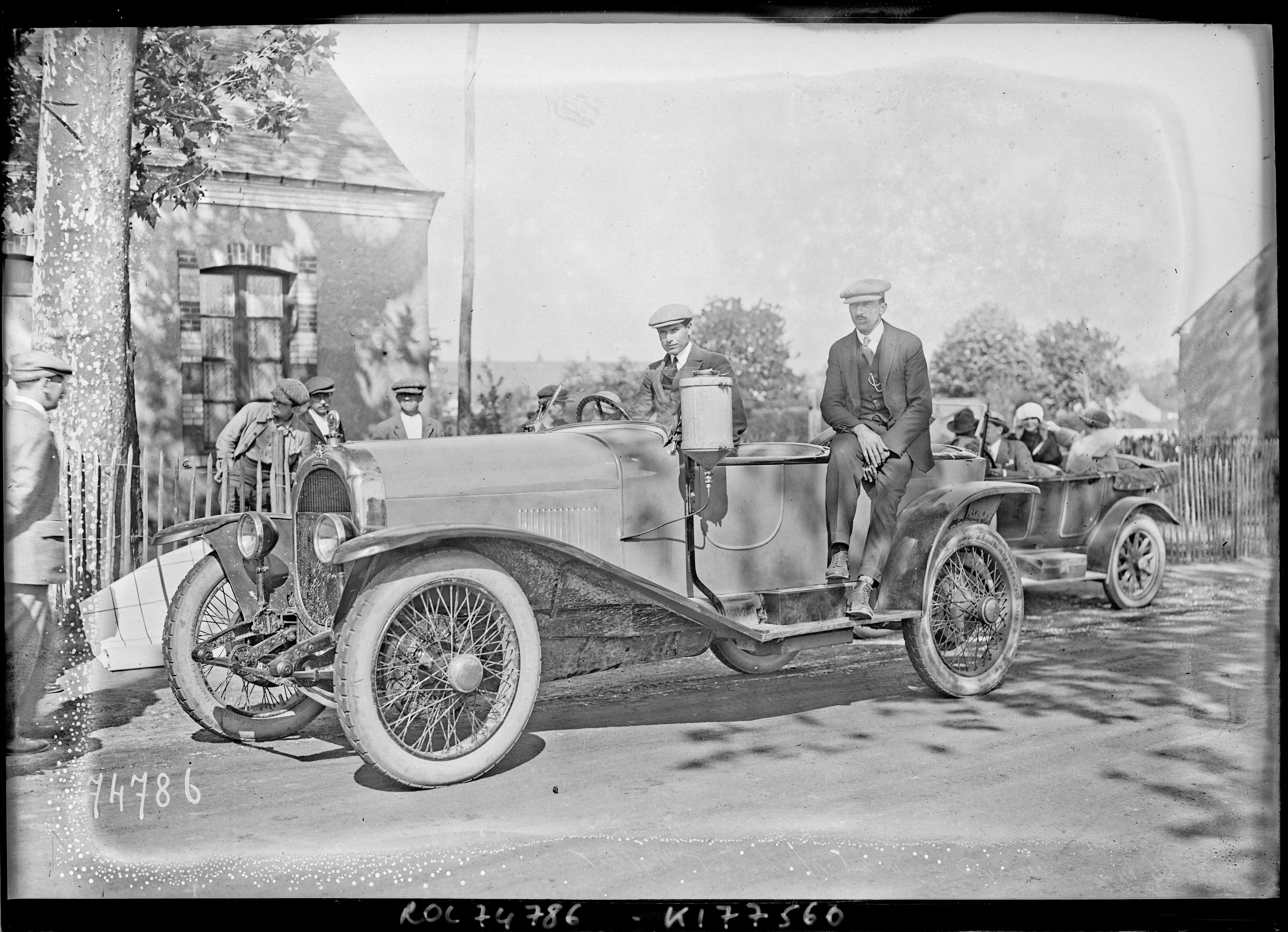
Lucien Chenard on a Chenard & Walcker (Le Mans, 22-05-1922)

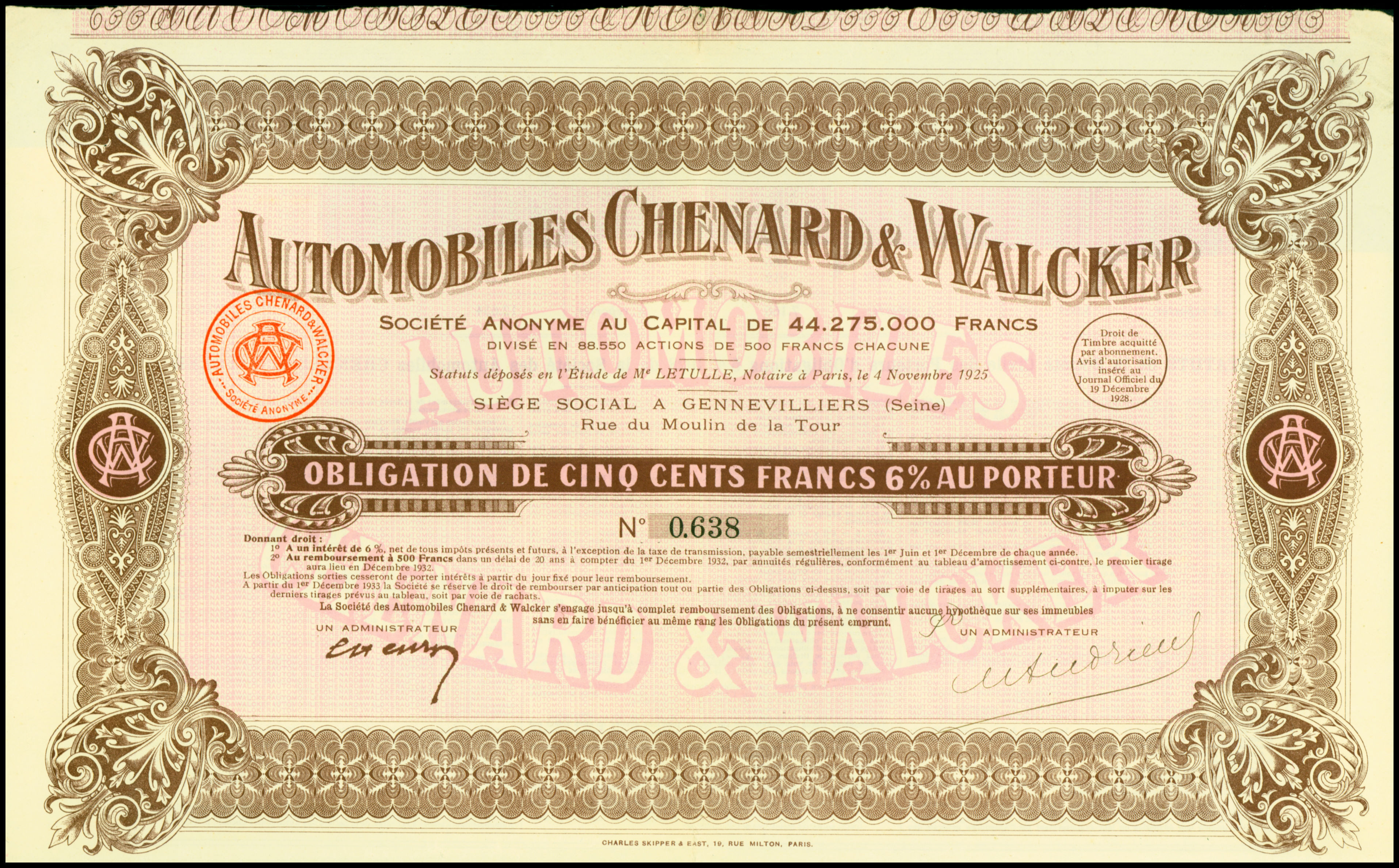
Bond of Automobiles Chenard & Walcker, issued 19. Dezember 1928

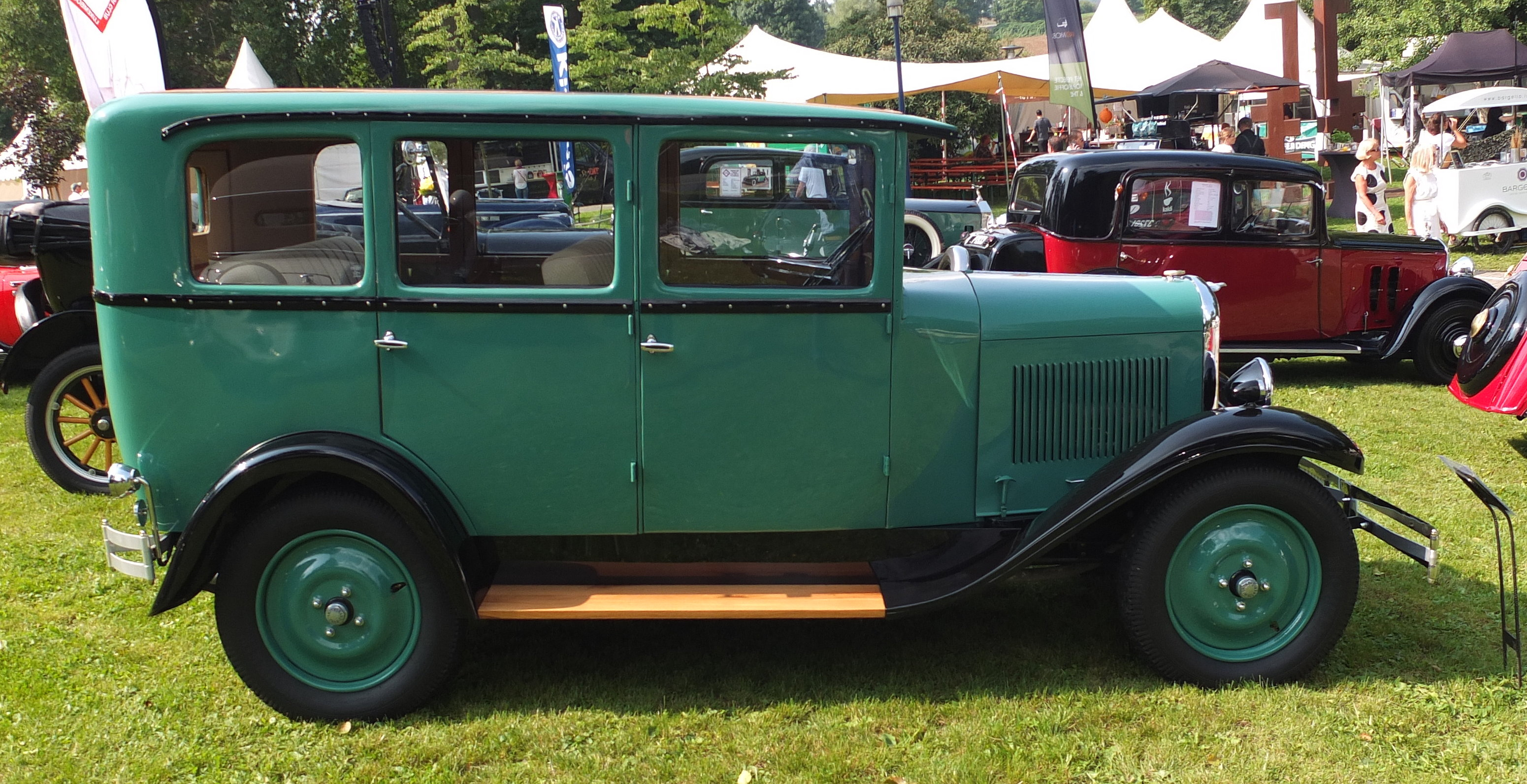
1930 Chenard et Walcker Y6 "Boulangère"

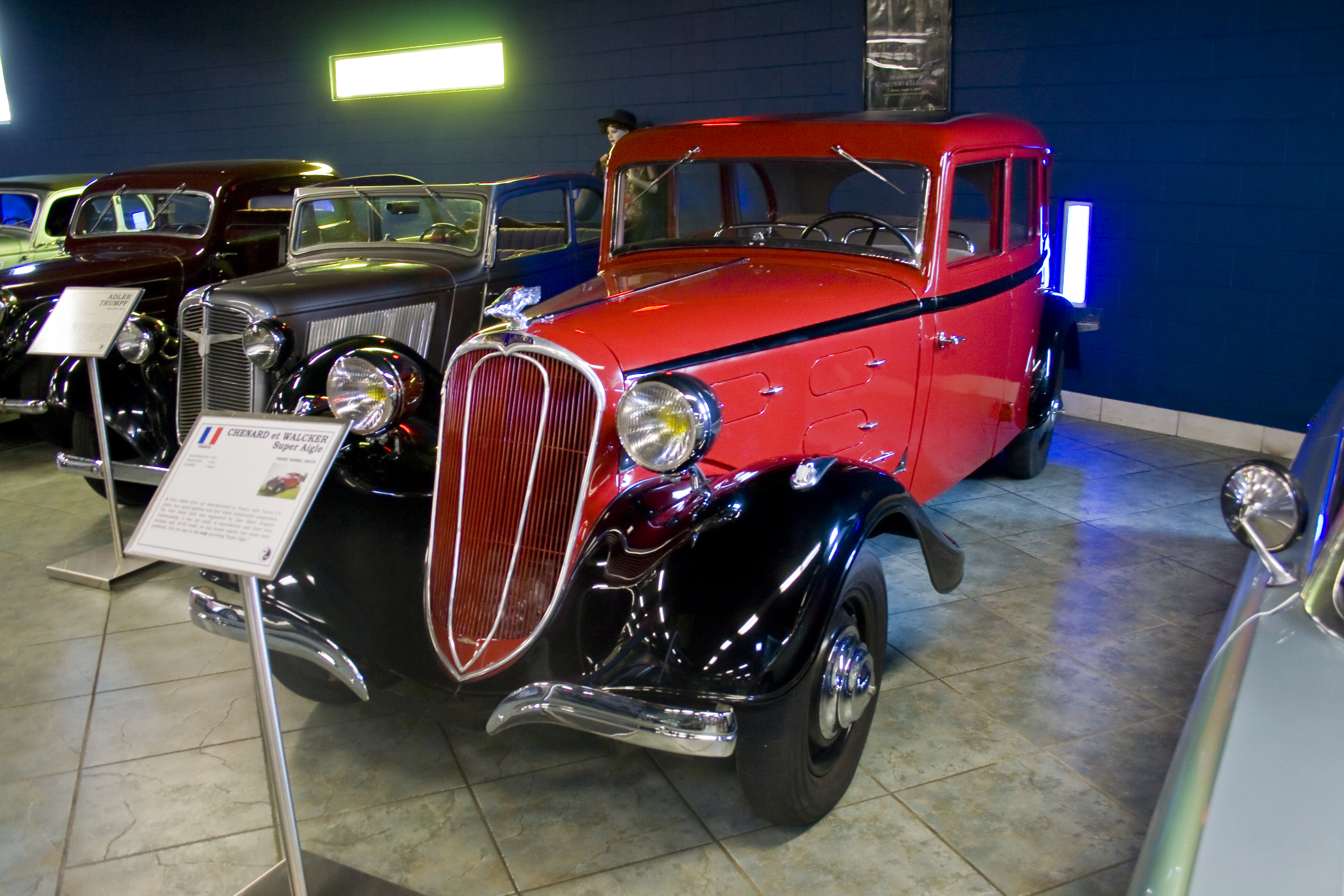
1933 Chenard et Walcker T9T (front-wheel drive)

During World War I Hispano-Suiza aircraft engines were made as well as military versions of the Type U car. With peace, only production of the six-cylinder, now called the Model UU, was resumed but in 1920 a brand new 2,648 cc (161.6 cu in) four, the 12CV, was added. FAR commercial vehicles were also made. Following the death of Ernest Chenard in 1922, his son Lucien Chenard (1896–1971) took over.

The 3-litre car of 1922, designed by Henri Toutée (1884–1943) who had been with the company since 1906, with overhead camshaft engine was the winner of the first Le Mans 24 Hours Race, in 1923 driven by René Léonard and André Lagache, both engineers employed by Chenard et Walcker. A 2-litre version, the 10/12 was subsequently sold to the public.

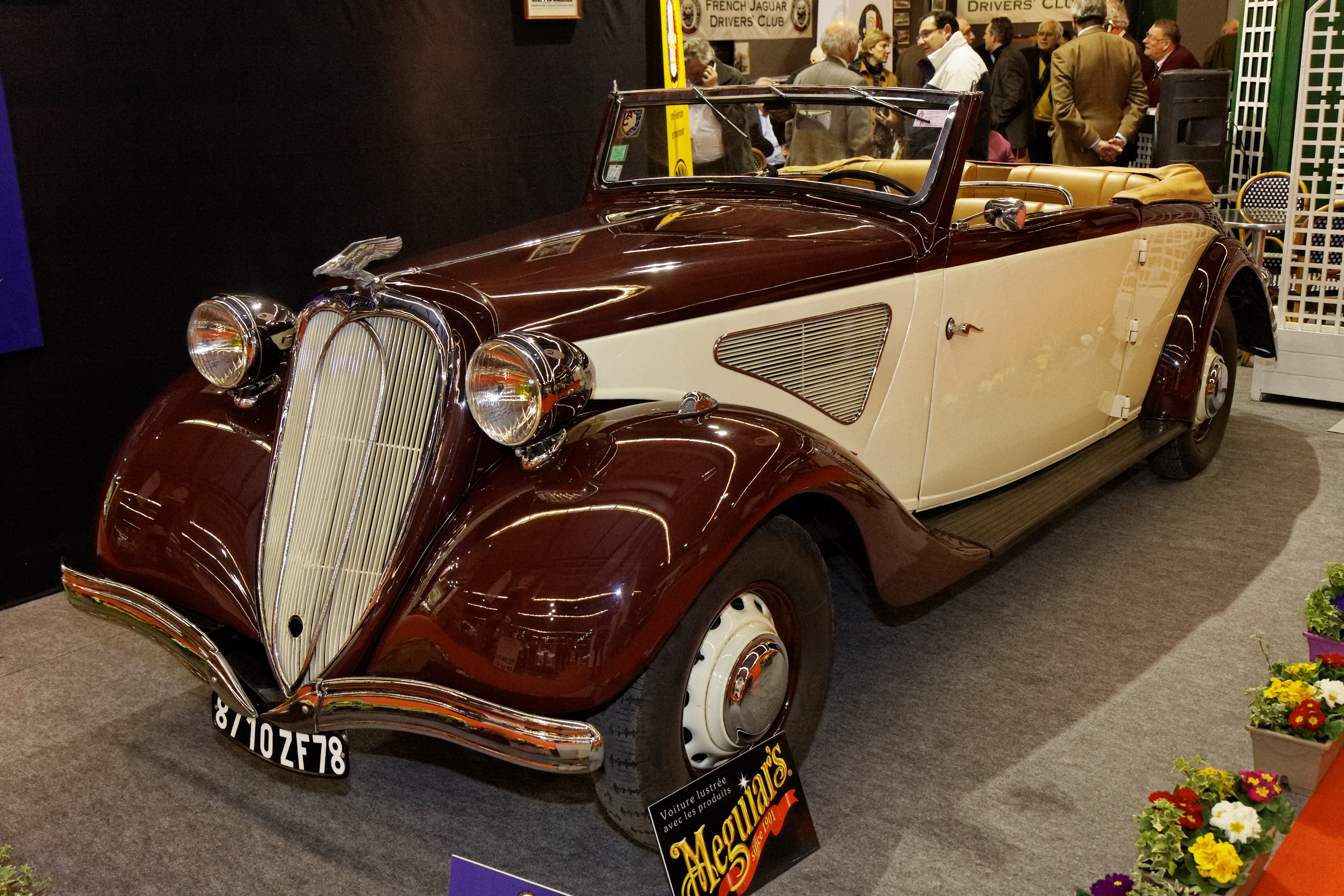
1936 Chenard et Walcker T24C Super Aigle (front-wheel drive)

In 1925 Chenard et Walcker was the fourth largest car maker in France. In 1927 the company entered into a tripartite "consortium" (collaboration) with Delahaye and Rosengart, sharing designs and components. Unic were also offered a place in the consortium but declined the offer. The "entente" was advertised in 1929 with the slogan "L'Union fait la force" The arrangement lasted almost four years, until 1931, when it would be Chenard et Walcker that broke with the other partners. In a letter dated 13 June 1930 to Delahaye, the company's president stated that it seemed quite impossible to continue the collaboration as it was then working, and the collaboration was formally dissolved at the end of September 1931, the fifteen intervening months having been used by the partners to configure their separate model ranges, although some "run-out" models from the period of the collaboration continued to appear after 1931.

Front independent suspension was introduced on some 1934 models and also front-wheel drive using Grégoire designs on the Super Aigle models but this was not a great success as it was launched at the same time as the Citroën Traction Avant but was considerably more expensive. In the same year the Aigle 8 with V-8 engine was launched.

=== Decline ===
The company never had sufficient capital to modernise and the cars remained largely hand-built leaving them unable to compete on price. As a result, they went bankrupt in 1936 and were taken over by body maker Chausson. The 1938 models shared bodies with Matford, distinguishable only by the radiator grilles and were powered by Citroën or Ford V-8 engines. There were plans to rejuvenate (again) the appearance of the big Chenard & Walcker "Aigle 22CV" model for 1939, giving it a raked grille, but this came to nothing and car production finally ceased in 1939 or 1940. In April 1940, an advertisement for the company's Matford-based passenger cars appeared in the French-language version of a leading Swiss-based motor magazine but, by this time, the company appears to have been finishing up existing stocks of new cars rather than building more.

=== The war years ===
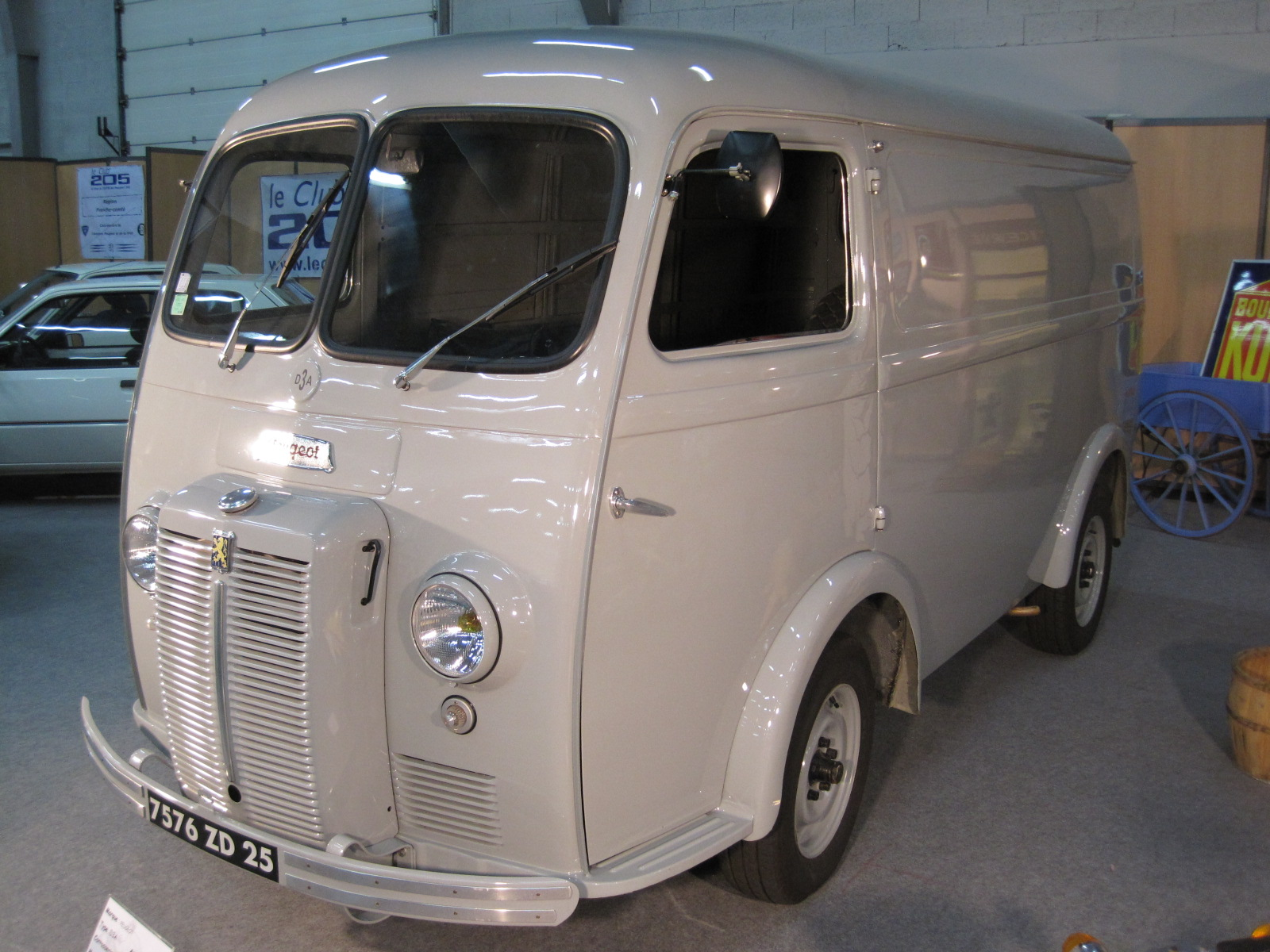
Fourgon D3 marketed from 1950 to 1965

In September 1939 France declared war on Germany and in June 1940 the German Army rapidly invaded and occupied Northern France. The war years were characterised by a desperate shortage of raw materials for civilian industry and of petrol. In 1940 Chenard & Walcker presented the prototype for a light van based ambulance intended for the army, and this vehicle turned out to be the first in a long line of forward control light vans. By 1941 the van was listed for civilian use, powered by a compact 720 cc (44 cu in) two-stroke water-cooled engine which occupied a central position between the driver's right leg and the left leg of his passenger. Power output was in the region of 20 hp (15 kW) which seems to have been barely compatible with the stated 1,500 kg (3,300 lb) of carrying capacity. By 1942 fuel for civilian use had become virtually unobtainable and an electric-powered version of the little van was offered by a company called Sovel. Although the success of the little van was not sufficient to ensure the manufacturer a long-term future in vehicle production, the van itself endured. Towards the end of the 1940s Chausson (the company which by now had acquired Chenard & Walcker) itself fell into the hands of Peugeot, and the van acquired the engine from the Peugeot 202. A few years later, in 1950, it was rebranded as the Peugeot D3 van. The last ones to carry the Chenard name were made in 1950.

== Competition ==
Chenard-Walcker won the inaugural 1923 24 Hours of Le Mans with one of three cars entered. Car number 9, driven by André Lagache and René Léonard, won the race by completing 128 laps. Four laps behind, in second place, came car number 10 driven by Raoul Bachmann and Christian Dauvergne. Their third entry, car number 11 driven by Fernand Bachmann and Raymond Glaszmann, completed 110 laps and finished in seventh place overall. All three cars were Type U 15CV Sport models competing in the 3.0 classification, within which they finished first, second, and fourth. Collectively they completed 362 laps, more than any other manufacturer in the race.

== Tracteurs FAR ==
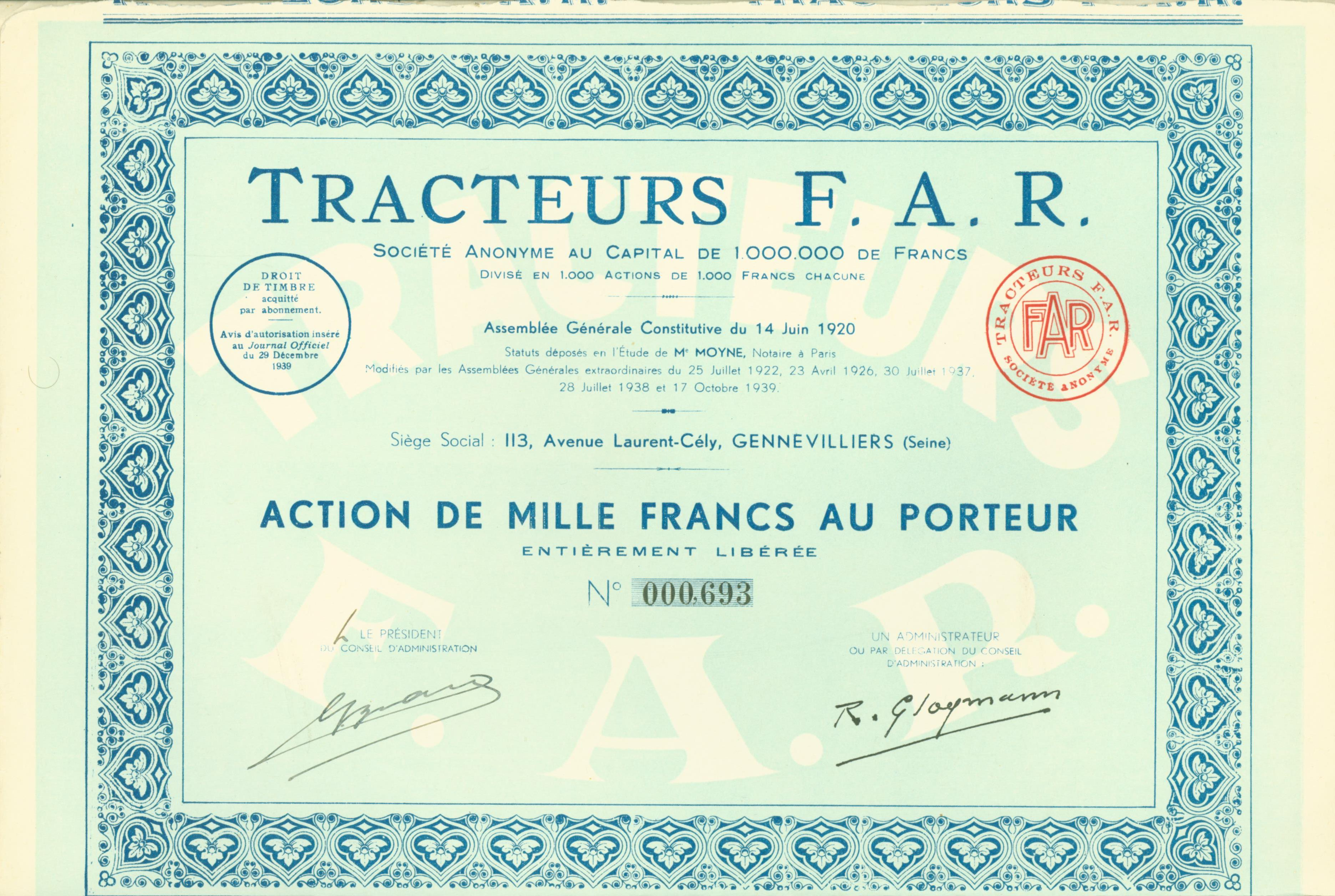
Share of the Tracteurs FAR S. A., issued 29. December 1939

FAR was a French truck manufacturer, affiliated with Chenard-Walcker. It was founded in 1919 and ceased manufacture in 1970. André Lagache, winner of the inaugural 24 Hours of Le Mans in 1923 driving a Chenard Walcker, was one of the founders of Tracteurs FAR and was denoted by the "A" in FAR.

Among the company's products was the 'Pony Mécanique', developed by the Napier motor company and improved in design by Oliver Danson North. It was a three-wheeled articulated tractor unit fitted with automatic coupling gear to enable rapid change of trailers. These vehicles were built under licence from Scammell (Scammell Mechanical Horse) from 1937 to 1970, but the FAR production used the Citroën Traction Avant engine.

== Major models ==
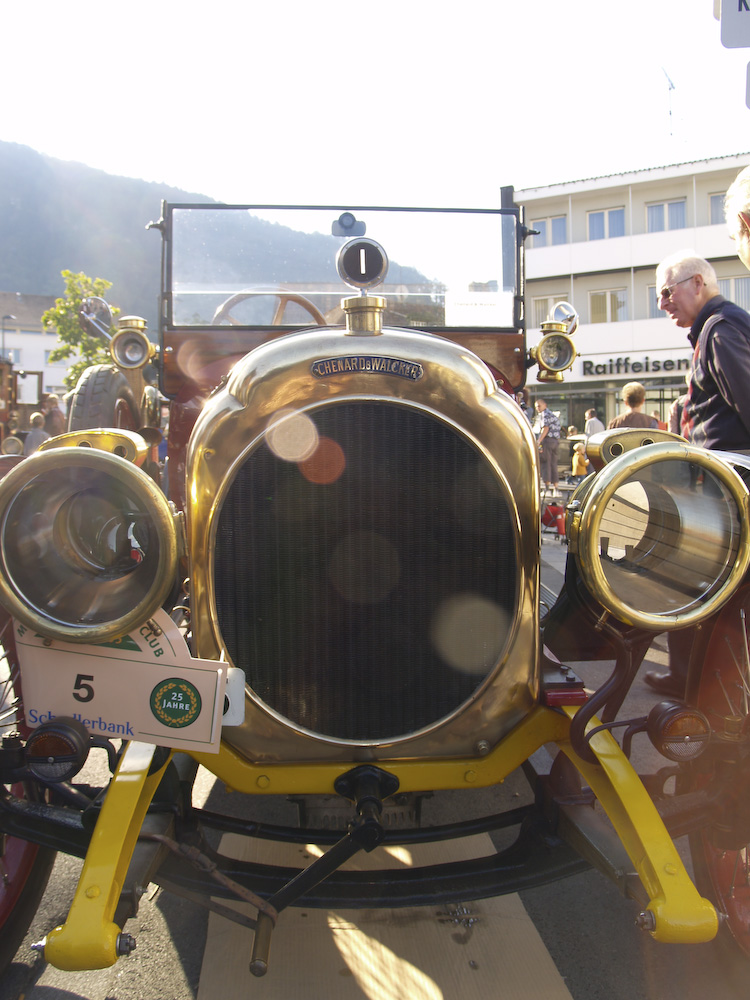
Type U (1913), 4 cylinders, 3014 cc, 15 hp

- 14/16 1905
- Type M 1907
- Type N 1907
- Type P 1910
- Type U 15CV 1913
- Type UU 1919
- Type U 12CV 1920
- Type TT 1922
- 3-litre 1922
- 10/15CV 1924
- 12/25CV 1924
- 22CV Straight 8 1924
- 14CV 1929
- Y6 1929
- 8CV 1931
- Super Aigle 4 1934
- Aiglon 1934
- Aigle 4S 1934
- Aigle 8 1934
- Aigle 20 1938
- Aigle 22 1938
