= Englebert (tyre manufacturer) =

Defunct Belgian company

- Industry: Automotive
- Founded: 1868; 158 years ago
- Founder: Oscar Englebert
- Defunct: 1979; 47 years ago
- Successor: Uniroyal
- Headquarters: Liège, Belgium
- Products: Tyres

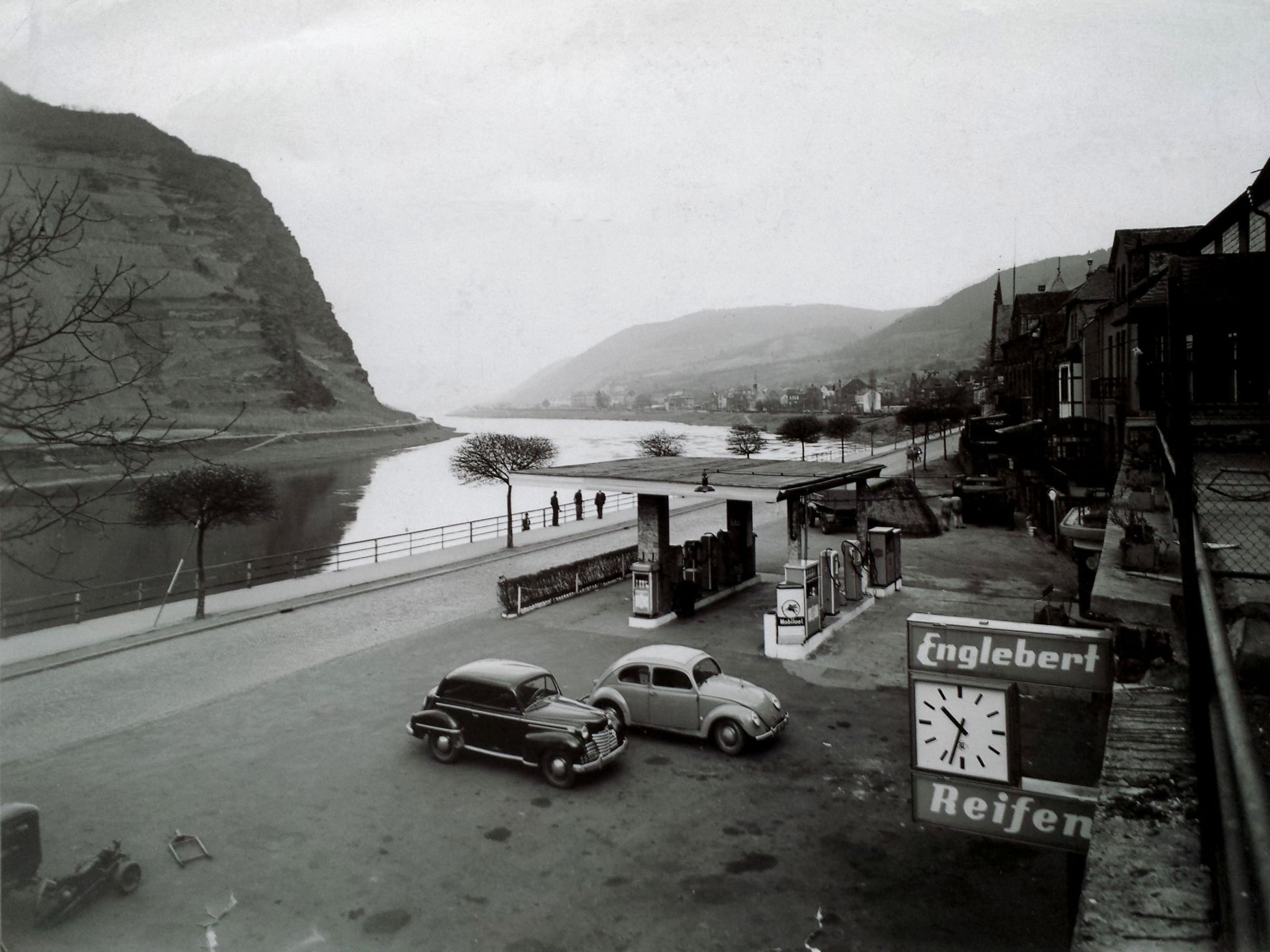
Gas station in Cochem on the River Moselle with Englebert Tires sign with clock

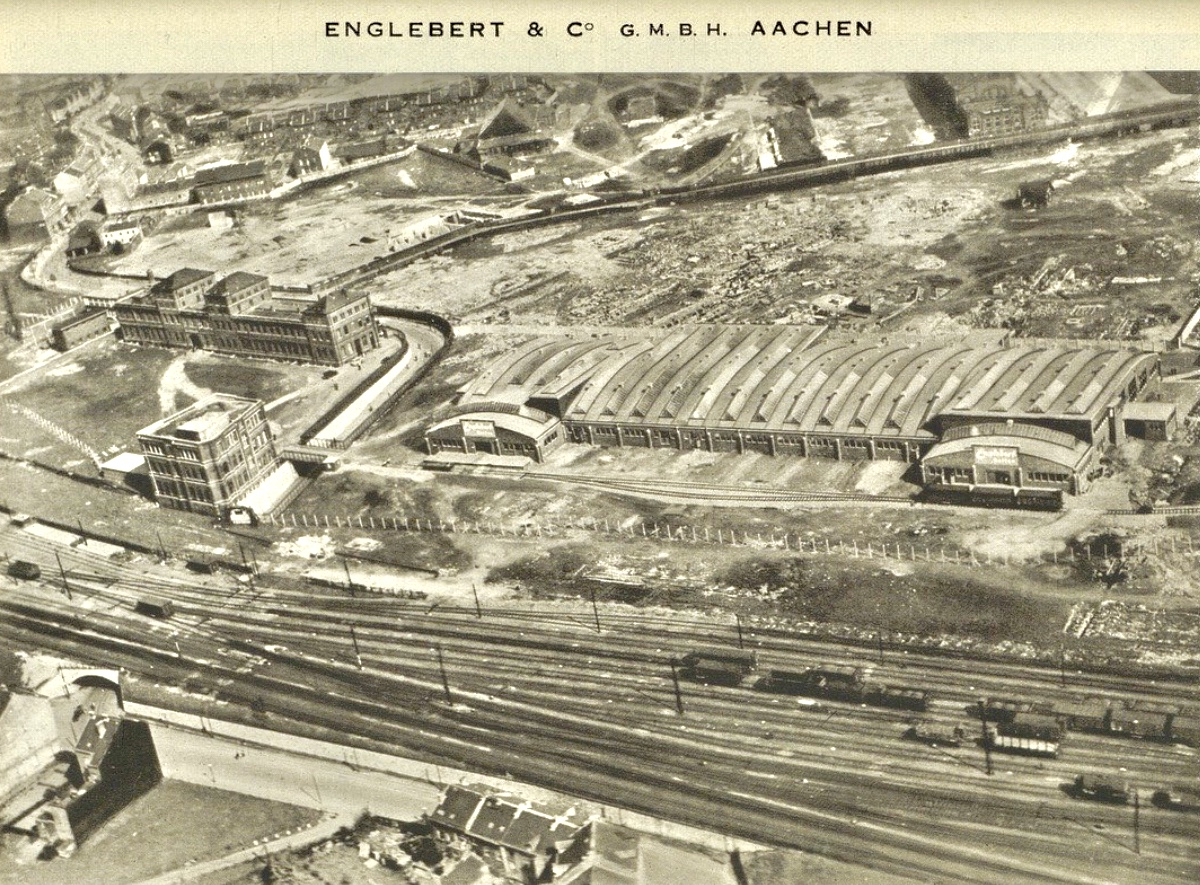
Englebert Aachen about 1931

Englebert was a Belgian rubber products company founded by Oscar Englebert in Liège in 1868. It became a leading tyre manufacturing company, and is a key predecessor to Uniroyal in Europe.

== History ==
In 1898 Oscar Englebert, who till then had worked with rubberised coatings and mats, set up a tyre factory at Herstal in Belgium, manufacturing pneumatic tyres for bicycles and automobiles, and by 1912 the business employed 400 people. By 1926 the workforce had grown to 3,500 and was one of Europe's top five rubber manufacturing businesses. In 1929, Englebert set up a second tyre plant just across the border at Aachen-Rothe Erde in Germany. In 1931 the Société du Pneu Englebert (Englebert Tyre Company) was born. The company acquired a French tyre factory in Clairoix in 1936; it was here, in 1937, that Englebert produced their millionth tyre.

After the war, in 1958, the company entered into a partnership agreement with Uniroyal, then one of the world's top three tyre manufacturers. Ten years later, in 1966, the company's name was changed to Uniroyal Englebert. In 1979 Uniroyal sold its European business which was integrated into the Continental Tyre Company. The Uniroyal brand survived within Continental, but the Englebert brand disappeared.

== Racing ==
The company entered racing in the 1930s with touring and sports car road races. Englebert tyres were the first to complete the 24 Hours of Le Mans without a change.

Englebert tyres were used during 61 Grand Prix races between 1950 and 1958, and were fitted to eight race winners, on each occasion with the Ferrari team.

Englebert started in Formula One at the 1950 Monaco Grand Prix, with French Simca-Gordini drivers Robert Manzon and Maurice Trintignant. During the 1957 Mille Miglia, driver Alfonso de Portago, his co-driver, and nine spectators were killed when de Portago's 4.0-litre Ferrari 335 S lost control after suffering a blown tyre. The Ferrari sailed over an embankment and into the air, where it crashed into the crowd. Englebert, who had supplied the Ferrari's tyres, and Enzo Ferrari himself were all charged with manslaughter by Italian prosecutors in an investigation that lasted until 1961, when both Ferrari and Englebert were cleared of charges.
