= List of 24 Hours of Le Mans winners =

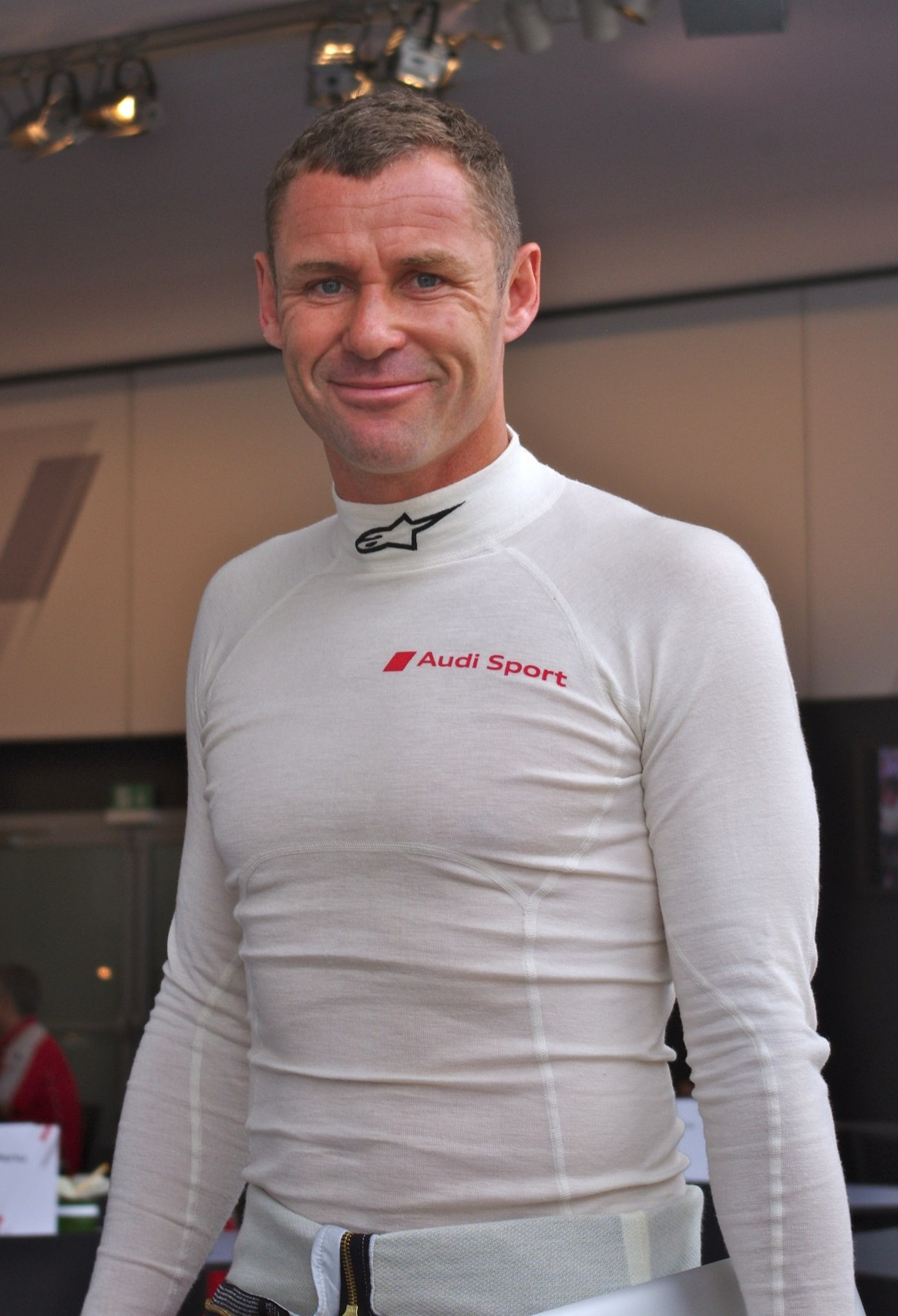
Tom Kristensen has won the 24 Hours of Le Mans nine times, more than any other driver.

The 24 Hours of Le Mans (French: 24 Heures du Mans) is an annual 24-hour automobile endurance race organised by the automotive group Automobile Club de l'Ouest (ACO) and held on the Circuit de la Sarthe race track close to the city of Le Mans, the capital of the French department of Sarthe. It was first held as the Grand Prix of Endurance and Efficiency in 1923, after the automotive journalist Charles Faroux to Georges Durand, the ACO general secretary, and the industrialist Emile Coquile, agreed to hold the race for car manufacturers to test vehicle durability, equipment and reliability. Each overall victor is presented with a trophy bearing the event's emblem and the logo of the ACO commissioned by the sporting director Jean-Pierre Moreau in 1993. All three-time consecutive winning manufacturers permanently keep the trophy. Since 1991, at the initiative of a man named Bernard Warain, a cast of the winning driver's feet, hands and signature are taken before the following year's race and put in a bronze car-wheel shaped plaque that is placed into the pavement in Le Mans' Saint Nicholas district.

Tom Kristensen has won the event nine times, more than any other competitor. Jacky Ickx, the previous record holder, is second with six victories, and Derek Bell, Frank Biela and Emanuele Pirro are third with five wins each. Kristensen also achieved a record six victories in succession from the 2000 to the 2005 editions. Hurley Haywood had the longest wait between his first Le Mans win and his last. He first won in 1977 and last won in 1994, a span of 17 years and 5 days. Alexander Wurz waited the longest between his inaugural victory at the 1996 event and his second win—following 12 years, 11 months, 29 days later—at the 2009 edition. Luigi Chinetti is the oldest Le Mans winner; he was 47 years, 11 months and 9 days old when he won the 1949 event. Wurz is the event's youngest winner; he was 22 years, 4 months and 1 day old when he won the 1996 race. There have been a record 35 victors from the United Kingdom, followed by France with 28 and Germany with 18. A total of four countries have produced just one winner.

Porsche have won the most races as a manufacturer with 19 since their first in 1970. Audi are second with 13 wins and Ferrari are third with 12 victories. Porsche also achieved the most consecutive wins with seven victories in succession from 1981 to 1987. German manufacturers have won a record 34 times amongst four constructors, followed by the United Kingdom with 17 victories amongst 6 manufacturers and France with 15 wins amongst 9 constructors. Joest Racing are the most successful race team with 15 victories and the Audi R8 is the best race-winning vehicle with five victories.

As of the 2026 24 Hours of Le Mans, there have been 153 victorious drivers from 24 individual countries and 25 winning manufacturers representing 7 different nations in the race's 94 editions. The first two winners were André Lagache and René Léonard in 1923, and the most recent drivers to achieve their first victory was Nyck de Vries in 2026. All years (except 1977, 1979 and 1983) until 1985 saw two drivers per entry win before three participants per car became the norm from 1985 onwards. Timo Bernhard, Romain Dumas and Mike Rockenfeller set the record for the farthest distance covered by a race-winning team, driving 5,410.713 km (3,362.061 mi) and completing 397 laps in an Audi R15 TDI plus in 2010. Frank Clement and John Duff hold the record for the shortest distance covered by a victorious squad, completing 120 laps and 2,077.34 km (1,290.80 mi) sharing a Bentley 3 Litre Sport in 1924.

== Winners ==
Class abbreviations (part 1)
>3.0	Over 3-litre
3.0	3-litre
5.0	5-litre
8.0	8-litre
C	Group C
C1	Group C1
C2	Group C2
E +3.0	Experimental 3.0
Gr.5 SP	Group 5 Special Production
Gr.6 3.0	Group 6 S Sports 3-litre

Class abbreviations (part 2)
LMGT1	Le Mans Group GT1
Hypercar	Le Mans Hypercar
LMP	Le Mans Prototype
P 3.0	Prototype 3000
P 4.0	Prototype 4000
P +5.0	Prototype >5000
S +2.0	Sports +2000
S 3.0	Sports 3000
S 5.0	Sports >2000

Series abbreviations
CFC	Championnat de France des Circuits
CMVE	Challenge Mondial de Vitesse et Endurance
EEC	European Endurance Championship
GTC	FIA GT Cup
ICM	International Championship for Makes
ILMC	Intercontinental Le Mans Cup
SSGTC	Spanish Sports GT Championship
WCM	World Championship for Makes
WCED	World Challenge for Endurance Drivers
FIA WEC	FIA World Endurance Championship (2012–present)
WEC	World Endurance Championship (1981–1985)
WSC	World Sportscar Championship
WSPC	World Sports Prototype Championship

Tyre manufacturers
Symbol	Tyre manufacturer
A	Avon
C	Continental
D	Dunlop
E	Englebert
F	Firestone
G	Goodyear
M	Michelin
P	Pirelli
R	Rapson

Winners of the 24 Hours of Le Mans
Year	Drivers	Class	Team	Car and engine make	Tyre	Distance			Series	Ref
Year	Drivers	Class	Team	Car and engine make	Tyre	Laps	Km	Mi	Series	Ref
1923	André Lagache (FRA)	3.0	Chenard & Walcker SA (FRA)	Chenard-Walcker Type U3 15CV Sport	M	128	2209.536	1372.942	No series	
1923	René Léonard (FRA)	3.0	Chenard & Walcker SA (FRA)	Chenard-Walcker Type U3 15CV Sport	M	128	2209.536	1372.942	No series	
1924	Frank Clement (GBR)	3.0	Duff & Aldington (GBR)	Bentley 3 Litre Sport	R	120	2077.340	1290.799	No series	
1924	John Duff (CAN) (Note: While Canada had been independent since 1931, Canadians were deemed subjects of the United Kingdom until 1947.)	3.0	Duff & Aldington (GBR)	Bentley 3 Litre Sport	R	120	2077.340	1290.799	No series	
1925	Gérard de Courcelles (FRA)	5.0	Société Lorraine De Dietrich et Cie (FRA)	Lorraine-Dietrich B3-6 Sport	E	129	2233.982	1388.132	No series	
1925	André Rossignol (FRA)	5.0	Société Lorraine De Dietrich et Cie (FRA)	Lorraine-Dietrich B3-6 Sport	E	129	2233.982	1388.132	No series	
1926	Robert Bloch (FRA)	5.0	Société Lorraine De Dietrich et Cie (FRA)	Lorraine-Dietrich B3-6 Le Mans	D	148	2552.414	1585.997	No series	
1926	André Rossignol (FRA)	5.0	Société Lorraine De Dietrich et Cie (FRA)	Lorraine-Dietrich B3-6 Le Mans	D	148	2552.414	1585.997	No series	
1927	Dudley Benjafield (GBR)	3.0	Bentley Motors Limited (GBR)	Bentley 3 Litre Speed	D	137	2369.807	1472.530	No series	
1927	Sammy Davis (GBR)	3.0	Bentley Motors Limited (GBR)	Bentley 3 Litre Speed	D	137	2369.807	1472.530	No series	
1928	Woolf Barnato (GBR)	5.0	Bentley Motors Limited (GBR)	Bentley 4½ Litre	D	155	2669.272	1658.609	No series	
1928	Bernard Rubin (AUS)	5.0	Bentley Motors Limited (GBR)	Bentley 4½ Litre	D	155	2669.272	1658.609	No series	
1929	Woolf Barnato (GBR)	8.0	Bentley Motors Limited (GBR)	Bentley Speed Six	D	174	2843.830	1767.074	No series	
1929	Henry Birkin (GBR)	8.0	Bentley Motors Limited (GBR)	Bentley Speed Six	D	174	2843.830	1767.074	No series	
1930	Woolf Barnato (GBR)	>3.0	Bentley Motors Limited (GBR)	Bentley Speed Six	D	179	2930.663	1821.030	No series	
1930	Glen Kidston (GBR)	>3.0	Bentley Motors Limited (GBR)	Bentley Speed Six	D	179	2930.663	1821.030	No series	
1931	Henry Birkin (GBR)	3.0	Earl Howe (GBR)	Alfa Romeo 8C-2300 LM	D	184	3017.654	1875.083	No series	
1931	Earl Howe (GBR)	3.0	Earl Howe (GBR)	Alfa Romeo 8C-2300 LM	D	184	3017.654	1875.083	No series	
1932	Luigi Chinetti (ITA)	5.0	Raymond Sommer (FRA)	Alfa Romeo 8C-2300 LM	E	218	2954.038	1835.554	No series	
1932	Raymond Sommer (FRA)	5.0	Raymond Sommer (FRA)	Alfa Romeo 8C-2300 LM	E	218	2954.038	1835.554	No series	
1933	Tazio Nuvolari (ITA)	5.0	Raymond Sommer (FRA)	Alfa Romeo 8C-2300 MM	P	233	3144.038	1953.615	No series	
1933	Raymond Sommer (FRA)	5.0	Raymond Sommer (FRA)	Alfa Romeo 8C-2300 MM	P	233	3144.038	1953.615	No series	
1934	Luigi Chinetti (ITA)	3.0	Luigi Chinetti/Philippe Étancelin (ITA)	Alfa Romeo 8C 2300	E	213	2886.938	1793.860	No series	
1934	Philippe Étancelin (FRA)	3.0	Luigi Chinetti/Philippe Étancelin (ITA)	Alfa Romeo 8C 2300	E	213	2886.938	1793.860	No series	
1935	Luis Fontés (GBR)	5.0	Fox & Nichol (GBR)	Lagonda M45R Rapide	D	222	3006.797	1868.337	No series	
1935	Johnny Hindmarsh (GBR)	5.0	Fox & Nichol (GBR)	Lagonda M45R Rapide	D	222	3006.797	1868.337	No series	
1936	Not held as a result of worker strikes									
1937	Robert Benoist (FRA)	5.0	Roger Labric (FRA)	Bugatti Type 57G Tank	D	244	3287.938	2043.030	No series	
1937	Jean-Pierre Wimille (FRA)	5.0	Roger Labric (FRA)	Bugatti Type 57G Tank	D	244	3287.938	2043.030	No series	
1938	Eugène Chaboud (FRA)	5.0	Eugène Chaboud et Jean Trémoulet (FRA)	Delahaye 135CS	D	235	3180.940	1976.544	No series	
1938	Jean Trémoulet (FRA)	5.0	Eugène Chaboud et Jean Trémoulet (FRA)	Delahaye 135CS	D	235	3180.940	1976.544	No series	
1939	Pierre Veyron (FRA)	8.0	Jean-Pierre Wimille (FRA)	Bugatti Type 57S Tank	D	248	3354.760	2084.551	No series	
1939	Jean-Pierre Wimille (FRA)	8.0	Jean-Pierre Wimille (FRA)	Bugatti Type 57S Tank	D	248	3354.760	2084.551	No series	
1940–1948	Not held as a consequence of the World War II and the circuit being reconstructed									
1949	Luigi Chinetti (USA) (Note: Chinetti became an American citizen in 1946.)	S 2.0	Lord Selsdon (GBR)	Ferrari 166 MM	E	235	3178.299	1974.903	No series	
1949	Peter Mitchell-Thomson (GBR)	S 2.0	Lord Selsdon (GBR)	Ferrari 166 MM	E	235	3178.299	1974.903	No series	
1950	Jean-Louis Rosier (FRA)	S 5.0	Louis Rosier (FRA)	Talbot Lago Grand Sport T26	D	256	3465.120	2153.126	No series	
1950	Louis Rosier (FRA)	S 5.0	Louis Rosier (FRA)	Talbot Lago Grand Sport T26	D	256	3465.120	2153.126	No series	
1951	Peter Walker (GBR)	S 5.0	Peter Walker (GBR)	Jaguar XK-120C	D	267	3611.193	2243.891	No series	
1951	Peter Whitehead (GBR)	S 5.0	Peter Walker (GBR)	Jaguar XK-120C	D	267	3611.193	2243.891	No series	
1952	Hermann Lang (BRD)	S 3.0	Daimler-Benz A.G. (BRD)	Mercedes-Benz 300 SL W194	C	277	3733.800	2320.076	No series	
1952	Fritz Riess (BRD)	S 3.0	Daimler-Benz A.G. (BRD)	Mercedes-Benz 300 SL W194	C	277	3733.800	2320.076	No series	
1953	Duncan Hamilton (GBR)	S 5.0	Jaguar Cars Ltd. (GBR)	Jaguar C-Type	D	304	4088.064	2540.205	WSC	
1953	Tony Rolt (GBR)	S 5.0	Jaguar Cars Ltd. (GBR)	Jaguar C-Type	D	304	4088.064	2540.205	WSC	
1954	José Froilán González (ARG)	S 5.0	Scuderia Ferrari (ITA)	Ferrari 375 Plus	P	302	4061.150	2523.482	WSC	
1954	Maurice Trintignant (FRA)	S 5.0	Scuderia Ferrari (ITA)	Ferrari 375 Plus	P	302	4061.150	2523.482	WSC	
1955	Ivor Bueb (GBR)	S 5.0	Jaguar Cars Ltd. (GBR)	Jaguar D-Type	D	307	4135.380	2569.606	WSC	
1955	Mike Hawthorn (GBR)	S 5.0	Jaguar Cars Ltd. (GBR)	Jaguar D-Type	D	307	4135.380	2569.606	WSC	
1956	Ron Flockhart (GBR)	S 5.0	Ecurie Ecosse (GBR)	Jaguar D-Type	D	300	4034.929	2507.189	No series	
1956	Ninian Sanderson (GBR)	S 5.0	Ecurie Ecosse (GBR)	Jaguar D-Type	D	300	4034.929	2507.189	No series	
1957	Ivor Bueb (GBR)	S 5.0	Ecurie Ecosse (GBR)	Jaguar D-Type	D	327	4397.108	2732.236	WSC	
1957	Ron Flockhart (GBR)	S 5.0	Ecurie Ecosse (GBR)	Jaguar D-Type	D	327	4397.108	2732.236	WSC	
1958	Olivier Gendebien (BEL)	S 3.0	Scuderia Ferrari (ITA)	Ferrari 250 TR58	E	305	4101.926	2548.819	WSC	
1958	Phil Hill (USA)	S 3.0	Scuderia Ferrari (ITA)	Ferrari 250 TR58	E	305	4101.926	2548.819	WSC	
1959	Roy Salvadori (GBR)	S 3.0	David Brown Racing Dept. (GBR)	Aston Martin DBR1/300	A	323	4347.900	2701.660	WSC	
1959	Carroll Shelby (USA)	S 3.0	David Brown Racing Dept. (GBR)	Aston Martin DBR1/300	A	323	4347.900	2701.660	WSC	
1960	Paul Frère (BEL)	S 3.0	Scuderia Ferrari (ITA)	Ferrari 250 TR59/60	D	314	4217.527	2620.650	WSC	
1960	Olivier Gendebien (BEL)	S 3.0	Scuderia Ferrari (ITA)	Ferrari 250 TR59/60	D	314	4217.527	2620.650	GTC	
1961	Olivier Gendebien (BEL)	S 3.0	Scuderia Ferrari (ITA)	Ferrari 250 TRI/61	D	333	4476.580	2781.618	WSC	
1961	Phil Hill (USA)	S 3.0	Scuderia Ferrari (ITA)	Ferrari 250 TRI/61	D	333	4476.580	2781.618	GTC	
1962	Olivier Gendebien (BEL)	E +3.0	Scuderia Ferrari (ITA)	Ferrari 330 TRI/LM Spyder	D	331	4451.255	2765.882	WSC	
1962	Phil Hill (USA)	E +3.0	Scuderia Ferrari (ITA)	Ferrari 330 TRI/LM Spyder	D	331	4451.255	2765.882	CMVE	
1963	Lorenzo Bandini (ITA)	P 3.0	SpA Ferrari SEFAC (ITA)	Ferrari 250 P	D	339	4561.710	2834.515	WSC	
1963	Ludovico Scarfiotti (ITA)	P 3.0	SpA Ferrari SEFAC (ITA)	Ferrari 250 P	D	339	4561.710	2834.515	CMVE	
1964	Jean Guichet (FRA)	P 4.0	SpA Ferrari SEFAC (ITA)	Ferrari 275 P	D	349	4695.310	2917.530	WSC	
1964	Nino Vaccarella (ITA)	P 4.0	SpA Ferrari SEFAC (ITA)	Ferrari 275 P	D	349	4695.310	2917.530	CMVE	
1965	Masten Gregory (USA)	P 4.0	North American Racing Team (USA)	Ferrari 250 LM	G	348	4677.110	2906.221	WSC	
1965	Jochen Rindt (AUT)	P 4.0	North American Racing Team (USA)	Ferrari 250 LM	G	348	4677.110	2906.221	CMVE	
1966	Chris Amon (NZL) (Note: Ford decided to stage a photo finish and the ACO declared Amon and McLaren the 1966 winners because the duo began 20 metres (66 ft) away from their teammates Denny Hulme and Ken Miles.)	P +5.0	Shelby-American Inc. (USA)	Ford GT40 Mk. II	G	360	4843.090	3009.357	WSC	
1966	Bruce McLaren (NZL)	P +5.0	Shelby-American Inc. (USA)	Ford GT40 Mk. II	G	360	4843.090	3009.357	CMVE	
1967	A. J. Foyt (USA)	P +5.0	Shelby-American Inc. (USA)	Ford GT40 Mk. IV	G	388	5232.900	3251.573	WSC	
1967	Dan Gurney (USA)	P +5.0	Shelby-American Inc. (USA)	Ford GT40 Mk. IV	G	388	5232.900	3251.573	CMVE	
1968	Lucien Bianchi (BEL)	S 5.0	J. W. Automotive Engineering (GBR)	Ford GT40 Mk. I	F	331	4452.880	2766.891	ICM	
1968	Pedro Rodríguez (MEX)	S 5.0	J. W. Automotive Engineering (GBR)	Ford GT40 Mk. I	F	331	4452.880	2766.891	CMVE	
1969	Jacky Ickx (BEL)	S 5.0	J. W. Automotive Engineering (GBR)	Ford GT40 Mk. I	F	372	4998.000	3105.613	ICM	
1969	Jackie Oliver (GBR)	S 5.0	J. W. Automotive Engineering (GBR)	Ford GT40 Mk. I	F	372	4998.000	3105.613	CMVE	
1969	Jackie Oliver (GBR)	S 5.0	J. W. Automotive Engineering (GBR)	Ford GT40 Mk. I	F	372	4998.000	3105.613	CFC	
1970	Richard Attwood (GBR)	S 5.0	Porsche KG Salzburg (AUT)	Porsche 917KH Coupé	G	343	4607.810	2863.160	ICM	
1970	Hans Herrmann (BRD)	S 5.0	Porsche KG Salzburg (AUT)	Porsche 917KH Coupé	G	343	4607.810	2863.160	CMVE	
1971	Helmut Marko (AUT)	S 5.0	Martini Racing Team (BRD)	Porsche 917KH Coupé	F	397	5335.313	3315.210	ICM	
1971	Gijs van Lennep (NLD)	S 5.0	Martini Racing Team (BRD)	Porsche 917KH Coupé	F	397	5335.313	3315.210	CMVE	
1972	Graham Hill (GBR)	S 3.0	Equipe Matra-Simca Shell (FRA)	Matra-Simca MS670	G	344	4691.343	2915.065	WCM	
1972	Henri Pescarolo (FRA)	S 3.0	Equipe Matra-Simca Shell (FRA)	Matra-Simca MS670	G	344	4691.343	2915.065	CMVE	
1973	Gérard Larrousse (FRA)	S 3.0	Equipe Matra-Simca Shell (FRA)	Matra-Simca MS670B	G	355	4853.945	3016.102	WCM	
1973	Henri Pescarolo (FRA)	S 3.0	Equipe Matra-Simca Shell (FRA)	Matra-Simca MS670B	G	355	4853.945	3016.102	CMVE	
1973	Henri Pescarolo (FRA)	S 3.0	Equipe Matra-Simca Shell (FRA)	Matra-Simca MS670B	G	355	4853.945	3016.102	SSGTC	
1974	Gérard Larrousse (FRA)	S 3.0	Equipe Gitanes (FRA)	Matra-Simca MS670C	G	338	4606.571	2862.391	WCM	
1974	Henri Pescarolo (FRA)	S 3.0	Equipe Gitanes (FRA)	Matra-Simca MS670C	G	338	4606.571	2862.391	CMVE	
1975	Derek Bell (GBR)	S 3.0	Gulf Research Racing Co. (GBR)	Mirage GR8-Ford Cosworth	G	336	4595.577	2855.559	No series	
1975	Jacky Ickx (BEL)	S 3.0	Gulf Research Racing Co. (GBR)	Mirage GR8-Ford Cosworth	G	336	4595.577	2855.559	No series	
1976	Jacky Ickx (BEL)	Gp.6 3.0	Martini Racing Porsche System (BRD)	Porsche 936/76 Spyder	G	349	4769.923	2963.893	No series	
1976	Gijs van Lennep (NLD)	Gp.6 3.0	Martini Racing Porsche System (BRD)	Porsche 936/76 Spyder	G	349	4769.923	2963.893	No series	
1977	Jürgen Barth (BRD)	Gp.6 3.0	Martini Racing Porsche System (BRD)	Porsche 936/77 Spyder	D	342	4671.630	2902.816	No series	
1977	Hurley Haywood (USA)	Gp.6 3.0	Martini Racing Porsche System (BRD)	Porsche 936/77 Spyder	D	342	4671.630	2902.816	No series	
1977	Jacky Ickx (BEL)	Gp.6 3.0	Martini Racing Porsche System (BRD)	Porsche 936/77 Spyder	D	342	4671.630	2902.816	No series	
1978	Jean-Pierre Jaussaud (FRA)	Gp.6 3.0	Alpine Renault (FRA)	Renault Alpine A442B	M	369	5044.530	3134.526	WCED	
1978	Didier Pironi (FRA)	Gp.6 3.0	Alpine Renault (FRA)	Renault Alpine A442B	M	369	5044.530	3134.526	WCED	
1979	Klaus Ludwig (BRD)	Gp.5 SP	Porsche Kremer Racing (BRD)	Porsche 935 K3	D	307	4173.930	2593.560	WCED	
1979	Bill Whittington (USA)	Gp.5 SP	Porsche Kremer Racing (BRD)	Porsche 935 K3	D	307	4173.930	2593.560	WCED	
1979	Don Whittington (USA)	Gp.5 SP	Porsche Kremer Racing (BRD)	Porsche 935 K3	D	307	4173.930	2593.560	WCED	
1980	Jean-Pierre Jaussaud (FRA)	S +2.0	Jean Rondeau (FRA)	Rondeau M379B-Ford	G	338	4608.020	2863.291	WCM	
1980	Jean Rondeau (FRA)	S +2.0	Jean Rondeau (FRA)	Rondeau M379B-Ford	G	338	4608.020	2863.291	WCED	
1981	Derek Bell (GBR)	S +2.0	Porsche System (BRD)	Porsche 936/81	D	354	4825.348	2998.332	WEC	
1981	Jacky Ickx (BEL)	S +2.0	Porsche System (BRD)	Porsche 936/81	D	354	4825.348	2998.332	WEC	
1982	Derek Bell (GBR)	C	Rothmans Porsche System (BRD)	Porsche 956	D	359	4899.086	3044.151	WEC	
1982	Jacky Ickx (BEL)	C	Rothmans Porsche System (BRD)	Porsche 956	D	359	4899.086	3044.151	WEC	
1983	Hurley Haywood (USA)	C	Rothmans Porsche (BRD)	Porsche 956	D	371	5047.934	3136.641	EEC	
1983	Al Holbert (USA)	C	Rothmans Porsche (BRD)	Porsche 956	D	371	5047.934	3136.641	EEC	
1983	Vern Schuppan (AUS)	C	Rothmans Porsche (BRD)	Porsche 956	D	371	5047.934	3136.641	WEC	
1984	Klaus Ludwig (BRD)	C1	Joest Racing (BRD)	Porsche 956B	D	360	4900.276	3044.890	WEC	
1984	Henri Pescarolo (FRA)	C1	Joest Racing (BRD)	Porsche 956B	D	360	4900.276	3044.890	WEC	
1985	Paolo Barilla (ITA)	C1	Joest Racing (BRD)	Porsche 956B	D	374	5088.507	3161.852	WEC	
1985	Klaus Ludwig (BRD)	C1	Joest Racing (BRD)	Porsche 956B	D	374	5088.507	3161.852	WEC	
1985	"John Winter" (BRD) (Note: John Winter was the pseudonym of gentleman driver Louis Krages.)	C1	Joest Racing (BRD)	Porsche 956B	D	374	5088.507	3161.852	WEC	
1986	Derek Bell (GBR)	C1	Rothmans Porsche (BRD)	Porsche 962C	D	368	4972.731	3089.912	WSPC	
1986	Al Holbert (USA)	C1	Rothmans Porsche (BRD)	Porsche 962C	D	368	4972.731	3089.912	WSPC	
1986	Hans-Joachim Stuck (BRD)	C1	Rothmans Porsche (BRD)	Porsche 962C	D	368	4972.731	3089.912	WSPC	
1987	Derek Bell (GBR)	C1	Rothmans Porsche (BRD)	Porsche 962C	D	355	4791.777	2977.472	WSPC	
1987	Al Holbert (USA)	C1	Rothmans Porsche (BRD)	Porsche 962C	D	355	4791.777	2977.472	WSPC	
1987	Hans-Joachim Stuck (BRD)	C1	Rothmans Porsche (BRD)	Porsche 962C	D	355	4791.777	2977.472	WSPC	
1988	Johnny Dumfries (GBR)	C1	Silk Cut Jaguar (GBR)	Jaguar XJR-9LM	D	394	5332.790	3313.642	WSPC	
1988	Jan Lammers (NLD)	C1	Silk Cut Jaguar (GBR)	Jaguar XJR-9LM	D	394	5332.790	3313.642	WSPC	
1988	Andy Wallace (GBR)	C1	Silk Cut Jaguar (GBR)	Jaguar XJR-9LM	D	394	5332.790	3313.642	WSPC	
1989	Stanley Dickens (SWE)	C1	Team Sauber Mercedes (SWI)	Sauber C9/88-Mercedes-Benz	M	389	5265.115	3271.591	No series	
1989	Jochen Mass (BRD)	C1	Team Sauber Mercedes (SWI)	Sauber C9/88-Mercedes-Benz	M	389	5265.115	3271.591	No series	
1989	Manuel Reuter (BRD)	C1	Team Sauber Mercedes (SWI)	Sauber C9/88-Mercedes-Benz	M	389	5265.115	3271.591	No series	
1990	Martin Brundle (GBR)	C1	Silk Cut Jaguar (GBR)	Jaguar XJR-12 LM	G	359	4882.400	3033.783	No series	
1990	Price Cobb (USA)	C1	Silk Cut Jaguar (GBR)	Jaguar XJR-12 LM	G	359	4882.400	3033.783	No series	
1990	John Nielsen (DNK)	C1	Silk Cut Jaguar (GBR)	Jaguar XJR-12 LM	G	359	4882.400	3033.783	No series	
1991	Bertrand Gachot (BEL)	C2	Mazdaspeed Co. Ltd. (JPN)	Mazda 787B	D	362	4922.810	3058.892	WSC	
1991	Johnny Herbert (GBR)	C2	Mazdaspeed Co. Ltd. (JPN)	Mazda 787B	D	362	4922.810	3058.892	WSC	
1991	Volker Weidler (DEU)	C2	Mazdaspeed Co. Ltd. (JPN)	Mazda 787B	D	362	4922.810	3058.892	WSC	
1992	Mark Blundell (GBR)	C1	Peugeot Talbot Sport (FRA)	Peugeot 905 Evo 1 Bis	M	352	4787.200	2974.628	WSC	
1992	Yannick Dalmas (FRA)	C1	Peugeot Talbot Sport (FRA)	Peugeot 905 Evo 1 Bis	M	352	4787.200	2974.628	WSC	
1992	Derek Warwick (GBR)	C1	Peugeot Talbot Sport (FRA)	Peugeot 905 Evo 1 Bis	M	352	4787.200	2974.628	WSC	
1993	Christophe Bouchut (FRA)	C1	Peugeot Talbot Sport (FRA)	Peugeot 905 Evo 1 Bis	M	375	5100.000	3168.993	No series	
1993	Geoff Brabham (AUS)	C1	Peugeot Talbot Sport (FRA)	Peugeot 905 Evo 1 Bis	M	375	5100.000	3168.993	No series	
1993	Éric Hélary (FRA)	C1	Peugeot Talbot Sport (FRA)	Peugeot 905 Evo 1 Bis	M	375	5100.000	3168.993	No series	
1994	Mauro Baldi (ITA)	LMGT1	Le Mans Porsche Team (DEU) (Note: The 1994 victory is listed with Porsche; Dauer Sportwagen was the official constructor of the road car, a Porsche 962 heavily modified for street use and race homologation.)	Dauer 962 Le Mans-Porsche	G	344	4685.701	2911.560	No series	
1994	Yannick Dalmas (FRA)	LMGT1	Le Mans Porsche Team (DEU)	Dauer 962 Le Mans-Porsche	G	344	4685.701	2911.560	No series	
1994	Hurley Haywood (USA)	LMGT1	Le Mans Porsche Team (DEU)	Dauer 962 Le Mans-Porsche	G	344	4685.701	2911.560	No series	
1995	Yannick Dalmas (FRA)	LMGT1	Kokusai Kaihatsu Racing (GBR)	McLaren F1 GTR-BMW	M	298	4055.800	2520.157	No series	
1995	JJ Lehto (FIN)	LMGT1	Kokusai Kaihatsu Racing (GBR)	McLaren F1 GTR-BMW	M	298	4055.800	2520.157	No series	
1995	Masanori Sekiya (JPN)	LMGT1	Kokusai Kaihatsu Racing (GBR)	McLaren F1 GTR-BMW	M	298	4055.800	2520.157	No series	
1996	Davy Jones (USA)	LMP1	Joest Racing (DEU)	TWR Porsche WSC-95 (Note: The 1996 and 1997 victories are listed with Porsche, although the car was built by TWR on a modified Jaguar XJR-14 chassis, fitted with a Porsche 962 engine.)	G	354	4814.400	2991.529	No series	
1996	Manuel Reuter (DEU)	LMP1	Joest Racing (DEU)	TWR Porsche WSC-95	G	354	4814.400	2991.529	No series	
1996	Alexander Wurz (AUT)	LMP1	Joest Racing (DEU)	TWR Porsche WSC-95	G	354	4814.400	2991.529	No series	
1997	Michele Alboreto (ITA)	LMP	Joest Racing (DEU)	TWR Porsche WSC-95	G	361	4909.600	3050.684	No series	
1997	Stefan Johansson (SWE)	LMP	Joest Racing (DEU)	TWR Porsche WSC-95	G	361	4909.600	3050.684	No series	
1997	Tom Kristensen (DNK)	LMP	Joest Racing (DEU)	TWR Porsche WSC-95	G	361	4909.600	3050.684	No series	
1998	Laurent Aïello (FRA)	LMGT1	Porsche AG (DEU)	Porsche 911 GT1-98	M	351	4783.781	2972.504	No series	
1998	Allan McNish (GBR)	LMGT1	Porsche AG (DEU)	Porsche 911 GT1-98	M	351	4783.781	2972.504	No series	
1998	Stéphane Ortelli (MON) (Note: Ortelli is a French-born driver who is a citizen of Monaco.)	LMGT1	Porsche AG (DEU)	Porsche 911 GT1-98	M	351	4783.781	2972.504	No series	
1999	Yannick Dalmas (FRA)	LMP	Team BMW Motorsport (DEU)	BMW V12 LMR	M	366	4982.974	3096.276	No series	
1999	Pierluigi Martini (ITA)	LMP	Team BMW Motorsport (DEU)	BMW V12 LMR	M	366	4982.974	3096.276	No series	
1999	Joachim Winkelhock (DEU)	LMP	Team BMW Motorsport (DEU)	BMW V12 LMR	M	366	4982.974	3096.276	No series	
2000	Frank Biela (DEU)	LMP900	Audi Sport Team Joest (DEU)	Audi R8	M	368	5007.988	3111.819	No series	
2000	Tom Kristensen (DNK)	LMP900	Audi Sport Team Joest (DEU)	Audi R8	M	368	5007.988	3111.819	No series	
2000	Emanuele Pirro (ITA)	LMP900	Audi Sport Team Joest (DEU)	Audi R8	M	368	5007.988	3111.819	No series	
2001	Frank Biela (DEU)	LMP900	Audi Sport Team Joest (DEU)	Audi R8	M	321	4367.200	2713.652	No series	
2001	Tom Kristensen (DNK)	LMP900	Audi Sport Team Joest (DEU)	Audi R8	M	321	4367.200	2713.652	No series	
2001	Emanuele Pirro (ITA)	LMP900	Audi Sport Team Joest (DEU)	Audi R8	M	321	4367.200	2713.652	No series	
2002	Frank Biela (DEU)	LMP900	Audi Sport Team Joest (DEU)	Audi R8	M	375	5118.750	3180.644	No series	
2002	Tom Kristensen (DNK)	LMP900	Audi Sport Team Joest (DEU)	Audi R8	M	375	5118.750	3180.644	No series	
2002	Emanuele Pirro (ITA)	LMP900	Audi Sport Team Joest (DEU)	Audi R8	M	375	5118.750	3180.644	No series	
2003	Rinaldo Capello (ITA)	LMGTP	Team Bentley (GBR)	Bentley Speed 8	M	377	5145.571	3197.310	No series	
2003	Tom Kristensen (DNK)	LMGTP	Team Bentley (GBR)	Bentley Speed 8	M	377	5145.571	3197.310	No series	
2003	Guy Smith (GBR)	LMGTP	Team Bentley (GBR)	Bentley Speed 8	M	377	5145.571	3197.310	No series	
2004	Seiji Ara (JPN)	LMP1	Audi Sport Japan Team Goh (JPN)	Audi R8	M	379	5169.970	3212.470	No series	
2004	Rinaldo Capello (ITA)	LMP1	Audi Sport Japan Team Goh (JPN)	Audi R8	M	379	5169.970	3212.470	No series	
2004	Tom Kristensen (DNK)	LMP1	Audi Sport Japan Team Goh (JPN)	Audi R8	M	379	5169.970	3212.470	No series	
2005	JJ Lehto (FIN)	LMP1	Champion Racing (USA)	Audi R8	M	370	5050.500	3138.235	No series	
2005	Tom Kristensen (DNK)	LMP1	Champion Racing (USA)	Audi R8	M	370	5050.500	3138.235	No series	
2005	Marco Werner (DEU)	LMP1	Champion Racing (USA)	Audi R8	M	370	5050.500	3138.235	No series	
2006	Frank Biela (DEU)	LMP1	Audi Sport Team Joest (DEU)	Audi R10 TDI	M	380	5187.000	3223.052	No series	
2006	Emanuele Pirro (ITA)	LMP1	Audi Sport Team Joest (DEU)	Audi R10 TDI	M	380	5187.000	3223.052	No series	
2006	Marco Werner (DEU)	LMP1	Audi Sport Team Joest (DEU)	Audi R10 TDI	M	380	5187.000	3223.052	No series	
2007	Frank Biela (DEU)	LMP1	Audi Sport North America (DEU)	Audi R10 TDI	M	369	5029.101	3124.938	No series	
2007	Emanuele Pirro (ITA)	LMP1	Audi Sport North America (DEU)	Audi R10 TDI	M	369	5029.101	3124.938	No series	
2007	Marco Werner (DEU)	LMP1	Audi Sport North America (DEU)	Audi R10 TDI	M	369	5029.101	3124.938	No series	
2008	Rinaldo Capello (ITA)	LMP1	Audi Sport North America (DEU)	Audi R10 TDI	M	381	5192.649	3226.562	No series	
2008	Tom Kristensen (DNK)	LMP1	Audi Sport North America (DEU)	Audi R10 TDI	M	381	5192.649	3226.562	No series	
2008	Allan McNish (GBR)	LMP1	Audi Sport North America (DEU)	Audi R10 TDI	M	381	5192.649	3226.562	No series	
2009	David Brabham (AUS)	LMP1	Peugeot Sport Total (FRA)	Peugeot 908 HDi FAP	M	382	5206.278	3235.031	No series	
2009	Marc Gené (ESP)	LMP1	Peugeot Sport Total (FRA)	Peugeot 908 HDi FAP	M	382	5206.278	3235.031	No series	
2009	Alexander Wurz (AUT)	LMP1	Peugeot Sport Total (FRA)	Peugeot 908 HDi FAP	M	382	5206.278	3235.031	No series	
2010	Timo Bernhard (DEU)	LMP1	Audi Sport North America (DEU)	Audi R15 TDI plus	M	397	5410.713	3362.061	No series	
2010	Romain Dumas (FRA)	LMP1	Audi Sport North America (DEU)	Audi R15 TDI plus	M	397	5410.713	3362.061	No series	
2010	Mike Rockenfeller (DEU)	LMP1	Audi Sport North America (DEU)	Audi R15 TDI plus	M	397	5410.713	3362.061	No series	
2011	Marcel Fässler (SUI)	LMP1	Audi Sport Team Joest (DEU)	Audi R18 TDI	M	355	4838.295	3006.377	ILMC	
2011	André Lotterer (DEU)	LMP1	Audi Sport Team Joest (DEU)	Audi R18 TDI	M	355	4838.295	3006.377	ILMC	
2011	Benoît Tréluyer (FRA)	LMP1	Audi Sport Team Joest (DEU)	Audi R18 TDI	M	355	4838.295	3006.377	ILMC	
2012	Marcel Fässler (SUI)	LMP1	Audi Sport Team Joest (DEU)	Audi R18 e-tron quattro	M	378	5151.762	3201.156	FIA WEC	
2012	André Lotterer (DEU)	LMP1	Audi Sport Team Joest (DEU)	Audi R18 e-tron quattro	M	378	5151.762	3201.156	FIA WEC	
2012	Benoît Tréluyer (FRA)	LMP1	Audi Sport Team Joest (DEU)	Audi R18 e-tron quattro	M	378	5151.762	3201.156	FIA WEC	
2013	Loïc Duval (FRA)	LMP1	Audi Sport Team Joest (DEU)	Audi R18 e-tron quattro	M	348	4742.892	2947.096	FIA WEC	
2013	Tom Kristensen (DNK)	LMP1	Audi Sport Team Joest (DEU)	Audi R18 e-tron quattro	M	348	4742.892	2947.096	FIA WEC	
2013	Allan McNish (GBR)	LMP1	Audi Sport Team Joest (DEU)	Audi R18 e-tron quattro	M	348	4742.892	2947.096	FIA WEC	
2014	Marcel Fässler (SUI)	LMP1	Audi Sport Team Joest (DEU)	Audi R18 e-tron quattro	M	379	5167.13	3210.71	FIA WEC	
2014	André Lotterer (DEU)	LMP1	Audi Sport Team Joest (DEU)	Audi R18 e-tron quattro	M	379	5167.13	3210.71	FIA WEC	
2014	Benoît Tréluyer (FRA)	LMP1	Audi Sport Team Joest (DEU)	Audi R18 e-tron quattro	M	379	5167.13	3210.71	FIA WEC	
2015	Earl Bamber (NZL)	LMP1	Porsche Team (DEU)	Porsche 919 Hybrid	M	395	5382.82	3344.73	FIA WEC	
2015	Nico Hülkenberg (DEU)	LMP1	Porsche Team (DEU)	Porsche 919 Hybrid	M	395	5382.82	3344.73	FIA WEC	
2015	Nick Tandy (GBR)	LMP1	Porsche Team (DEU)	Porsche 919 Hybrid	M	395	5382.82	3344.73	FIA WEC	
2016	Romain Dumas (FRA)	LMP1	Porsche Team (DEU)	Porsche 919 Hybrid	M	384	5232.90	3251.57	FIA WEC	
2016	Neel Jani (SUI)	LMP1	Porsche Team (DEU)	Porsche 919 Hybrid	M	384	5232.90	3251.57	FIA WEC	
2016	Marc Lieb (DEU)	LMP1	Porsche Team (DEU)	Porsche 919 Hybrid	M	384	5232.90	3251.57	FIA WEC	
2017	Earl Bamber (NZL)	LMP1	Porsche LMP Team (DEU)	Porsche 919 Hybrid	M	367	5001.23	3107.62	FIA WEC	
2017	Timo Bernhard (DEU)	LMP1	Porsche LMP Team (DEU)	Porsche 919 Hybrid	M	367	5001.23	3107.62	FIA WEC	
2017	Brendon Hartley (NZL)	LMP1	Porsche LMP Team (DEU)	Porsche 919 Hybrid	M	367	5001.23	3107.62	FIA WEC	
2018	Fernando Alonso (ESP)	LMP1	Toyota Gazoo Racing (JPN)	Toyota TS050 Hybrid	M	388	5286.36	3284.79	FIA WEC	
2018	Sébastien Buemi (SUI)	LMP1	Toyota Gazoo Racing (JPN)	Toyota TS050 Hybrid	M	388	5286.36	3284.79	FIA WEC	
2018	Kazuki Nakajima (JPN)	LMP1	Toyota Gazoo Racing (JPN)	Toyota TS050 Hybrid	M	388	5286.36	3284.79	FIA WEC	
2019	Fernando Alonso (ESP)	LMP1	Toyota Gazoo Racing (JPN)	Toyota TS050 Hybrid	M	385	5245.25	3259.25	FIA WEC	
2019	Sébastien Buemi (SUI)	LMP1	Toyota Gazoo Racing (JPN)	Toyota TS050 Hybrid	M	385	5245.25	3259.25	FIA WEC	
2019	Kazuki Nakajima (JPN)	LMP1	Toyota Gazoo Racing (JPN)	Toyota TS050 Hybrid	M	385	5245.25	3259.25	FIA WEC	
2020	Sébastien Buemi (SUI)	LMP1	Toyota Gazoo Racing (JPN)	Toyota TS050 Hybrid	M	387	5272.46	3276.15	FIA WEC	
2020	Brendon Hartley (NZL)	LMP1	Toyota Gazoo Racing (JPN)	Toyota TS050 Hybrid	M	387	5272.46	3276.15	FIA WEC	
2020	Kazuki Nakajima (JPN)	LMP1	Toyota Gazoo Racing (JPN)	Toyota TS050 Hybrid	M	387	5272.46	3276.15	FIA WEC	
2021	Mike Conway (GBR)	Hypercar	Toyota Gazoo Racing (JPN)	Toyota GR010 Hybrid	M	371	5054.50	3140.72	FIA WEC	
2021	Kamui Kobayashi (JPN)	Hypercar	Toyota Gazoo Racing (JPN)	Toyota GR010 Hybrid	M	371	5054.50	3140.72	FIA WEC	
2021	José María López (ARG)	Hypercar	Toyota Gazoo Racing (JPN)	Toyota GR010 Hybrid	M	371	5054.50	3140.72	FIA WEC	
2022	Sébastien Buemi (SUI)	Hypercar	Toyota Gazoo Racing (JPN)	Toyota GR010 Hybrid	M	380	5177.17	3216.94	FIA WEC	
2022	Brendon Hartley (NZL)	Hypercar	Toyota Gazoo Racing (JPN)	Toyota GR010 Hybrid	M	380	5177.17	3216.94	FIA WEC	
2022	Ryo Hirakawa (JPN)	Hypercar	Toyota Gazoo Racing (JPN)	Toyota GR010 Hybrid	M	380	5177.17	3216.94	FIA WEC	
2023	James Calado (GBR)	Hypercar	Ferrari AF Corse (ITA)	Ferrari 499P	M	342	4659.40	2895.22	FIA WEC	
2023	Antonio Giovinazzi (ITA)	Hypercar	Ferrari AF Corse (ITA)	Ferrari 499P	M	342	4659.40	2895.22	FIA WEC	
2023	Alessandro Pier Guidi (ITA)	Hypercar	Ferrari AF Corse (ITA)	Ferrari 499P	M	342	4659.40	2895.22	FIA WEC	
2024	Antonio Fuoco (ITA)	Hypercar	Ferrari AF Corse (ITA)	Ferrari 499P	M	311	4237.07	2632.79	FIA WEC	
2024	Miguel Molina (ESP)	Hypercar	Ferrari AF Corse (ITA)	Ferrari 499P	M	311	4237.07	2632.79	FIA WEC	
2024	Nicklas Nielsen (DNK)	Hypercar	Ferrari AF Corse (ITA)	Ferrari 499P	M	311	4237.07	2632.79	FIA WEC	
2025	Phil Hanson (GBR)	Hypercar	AF Corse (ITA)	Ferrari 499P	M	387	5272.54	3276.20	FIA WEC	
2025	Robert Kubica (POL)	Hypercar	AF Corse (ITA)	Ferrari 499P	M	387	5272.54	3276.20	FIA WEC	
2025	Yifei Ye (CHN)	Hypercar	AF Corse (ITA)	Ferrari 499P	M	387	5272.54	3276.20	FIA WEC	
2026	Mike Conway (GBR)	Hypercar	Toyota Racing (JPN)	Toyota TR010 Hybrid	M	381	5190.33	3225.12	FIA WEC	
2026	Kamui Kobayashi (JPN)	Hypercar	Toyota Racing (JPN)	Toyota TR010 Hybrid	M	381	5190.33	3225.12	FIA WEC	
2026	Nyck de Vries (NLD)	Hypercar	Toyota Racing (JPN)	Toyota TR010 Hybrid	M	381	5190.33	3225.12	FIA WEC	

== Statistics ==
=== By driver ===
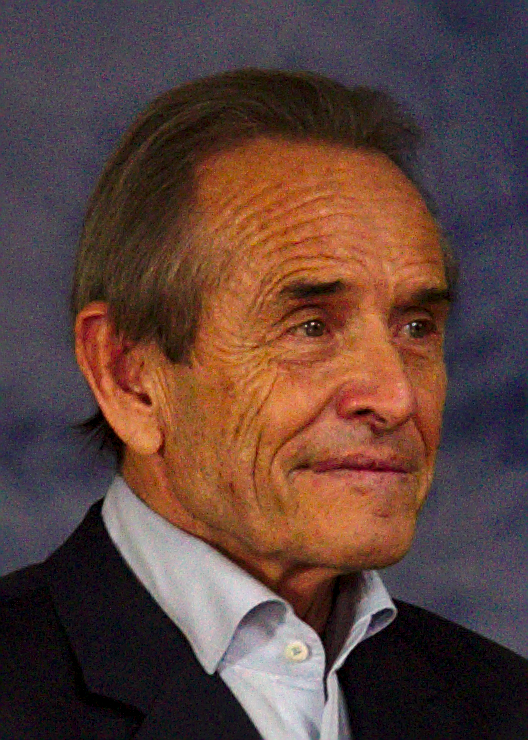
Jacky Ickx has won the 24 Hours of Le Mans six times.

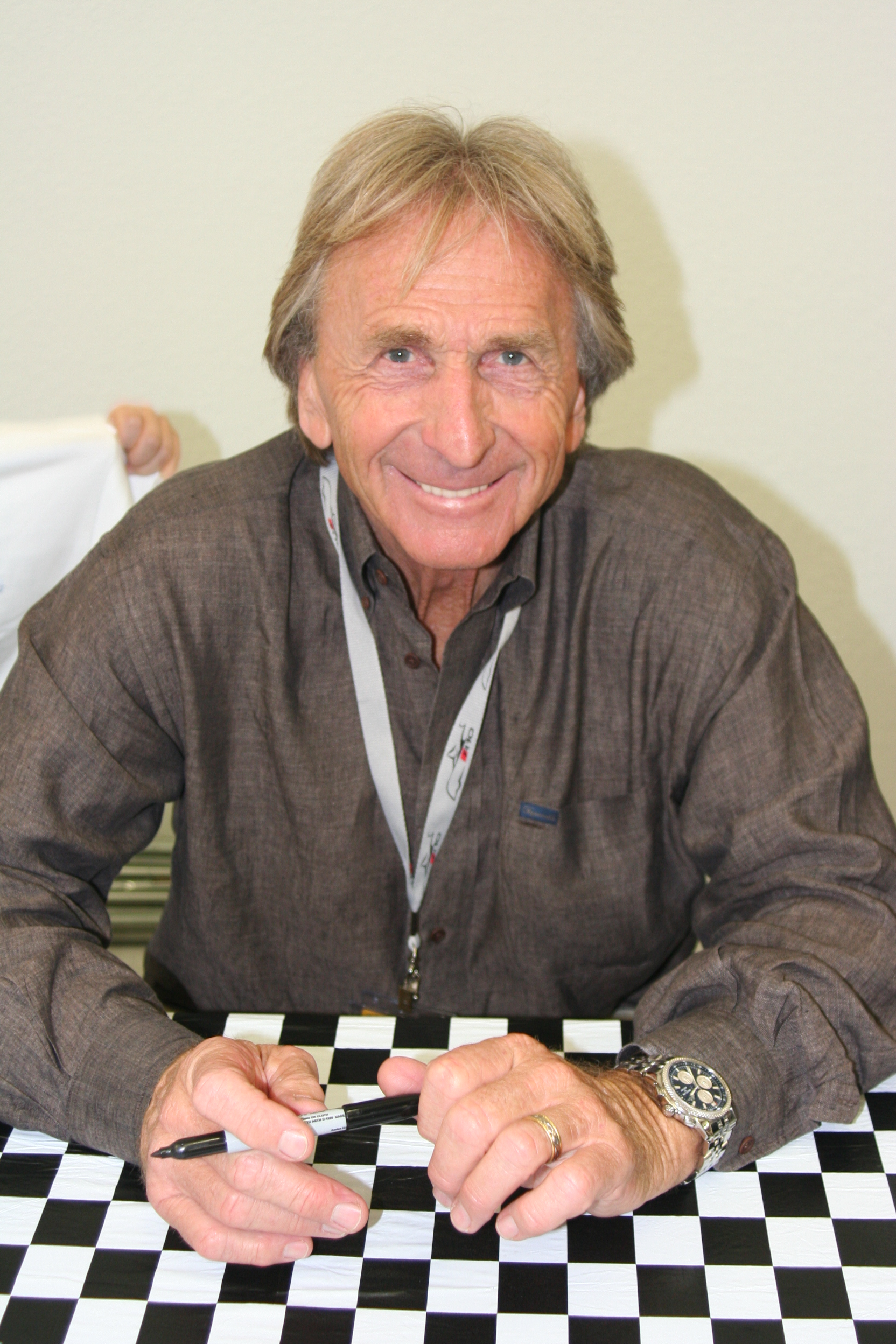
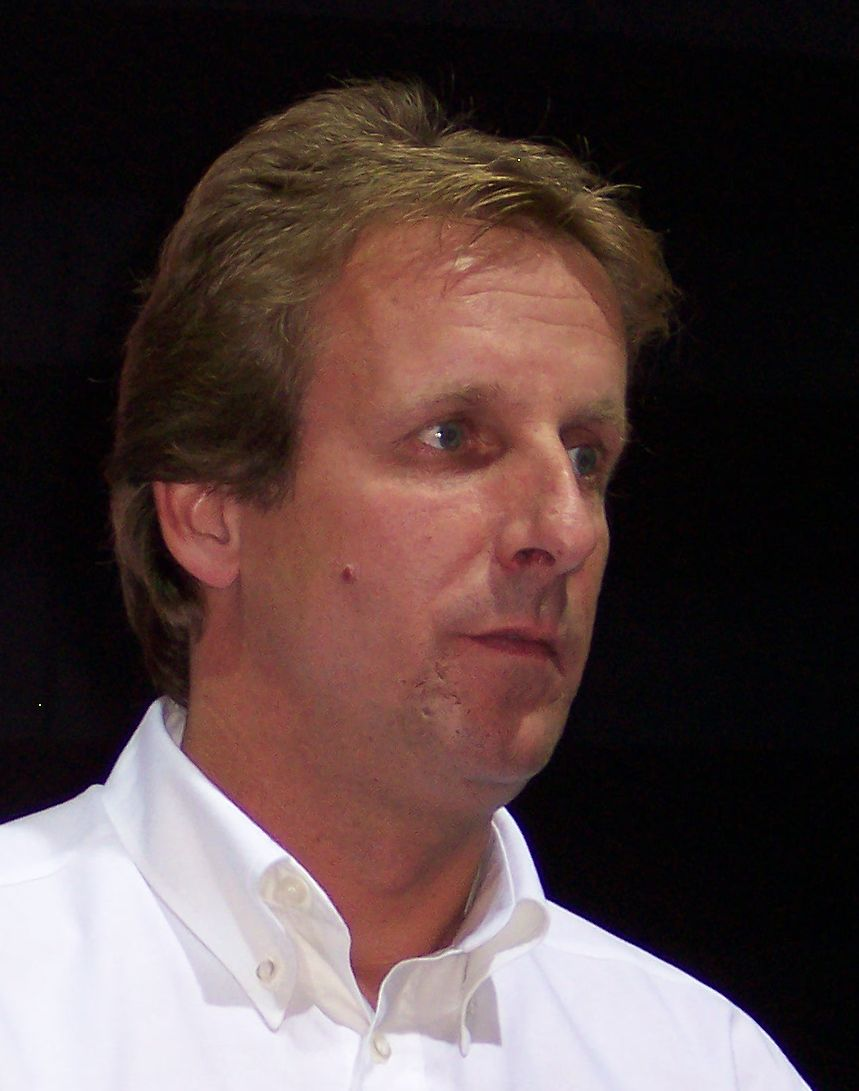
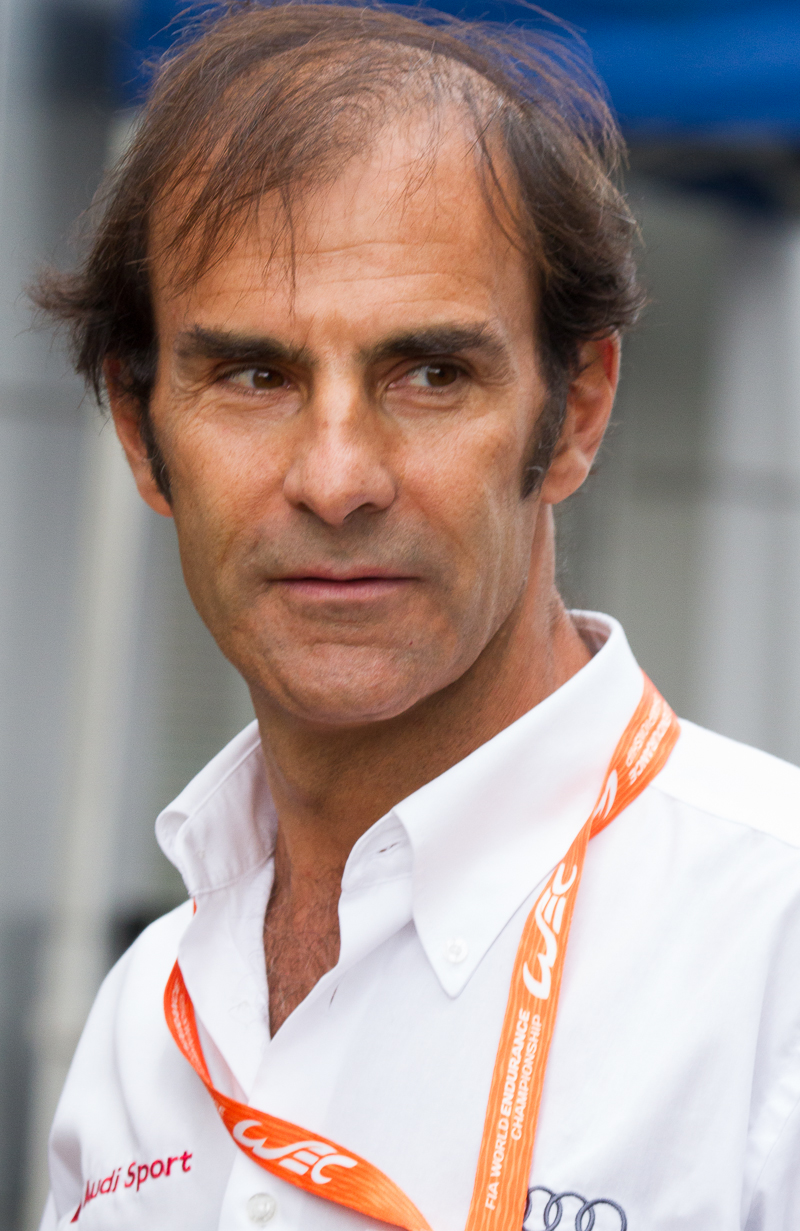
British driver Derek Bell (left), German driver Frank Biela (center) and Italian driver Emanuele Pirro (right) have each achieved five victories.

Multiple wins by driver
Driver	Wins	Years
(Denmark) Tom Kristensen	9	1997, 2000, 2001, 2002, 2003, 2004, 2005, 2008, 2013
(Belgium) Jacky Ickx	6	1969, 1975, 1976, 1977, 1981, 1982
(United Kingdom) Derek Bell	5	1975, 1981, 1982, 1986, 1987
(Germany) Frank Biela	5	2000, 2001, 2002, 2006, 2007
(Italy) Emanuele Pirro	5	2000, 2001, 2002, 2006, 2007
(Belgium) Olivier Gendebien	4	1958, 1960, 1961, 1962
(France) Henri Pescarolo	4	1972, 1973, 1974, 1984
(France) Yannick Dalmas	4	1992, 1994, 1995, 1999
(Switzerland) Sébastien Buemi	4	2018, 2019, 2020, 2022
(United Kingdom) Woolf Barnato	3	1928, 1929, 1930
(Italy) (United States) Luigi Chinetti	3	1932, 1934, 1949
(United States) Phil Hill	3	1958, 1961, 1962
(Germany) Klaus Ludwig	3	1979, 1984, 1985
(United States) Al Holbert	3	1983, 1986, 1987
(United States) Hurley Haywood	3	1977, 1983, 1994
(Germany) Marco Werner	3	2005, 2006, 2007
(Italy) Rinaldo Capello	3	2003, 2004, 2008
(United Kingdom) Allan McNish	3	1998, 2008, 2013
(Switzerland) Marcel Fässler	3	2011, 2012, 2014
(Germany) André Lotterer	3	2011, 2012, 2014
(France) Benoît Tréluyer	3	2011, 2012, 2014
(Japan) Kazuki Nakajima	3	2018, 2019, 2020
(New Zealand) Brendon Hartley	3	2017, 2020, 2022
(France) André Rossignol	2	1925, 1926
(United Kingdom) Henry Birkin	2	1929, 1931
(France) Raymond Sommer	2	1932, 1933
(France) Jean-Pierre Wimille	2	1937, 1939
(United Kingdom) Ivor Bueb	2	1955, 1957
(United Kingdom) Ron Flockhart	2	1956, 1957
(France) Gérard Larrousse	2	1973, 1974
(Netherlands) Gijs van Lennep	2	1971, 1976
(France) Jean-Pierre Jaussaud	2	1978, 1980
(Germany) Hans-Joachim Stuck	2	1986, 1987
(Germany) Manuel Reuter	2	1989, 1996
(Finland) JJ Lehto	2	1995, 2005
(Austria) Alexander Wurz	2	1996, 2009
(France) Romain Dumas	2	2010, 2016
(Germany) Timo Bernhard	2	2010, 2017
(New Zealand) Earl Bamber	2	2015, 2017
(Spain) Fernando Alonso	2	2018, 2019
(United Kingdom) Mike Conway	2	2021, 2026
(Japan) Kamui Kobayashi	2	2021, 2026

=== By nationality ===
Victories by nationality
Nationality	Wins	Drivers
United Kingdom	47	35
France	42	28
Germany	31	18
Italy	21	14
United States	18	12
Belgium	13	5
Denmark	11	3
Japan	8	5
Switzerland	8	3
New Zealand	7	4
Australia	4	4
Austria	4	3
Netherlands	4	3
Spain	4	3
Argentina	2	2
Sweden	2	2
Finland	2	1
Canada	1	1
China	1	1
Mexico	1	1
Monaco	1	1
Poland	1	1

=== By manufacturer ===
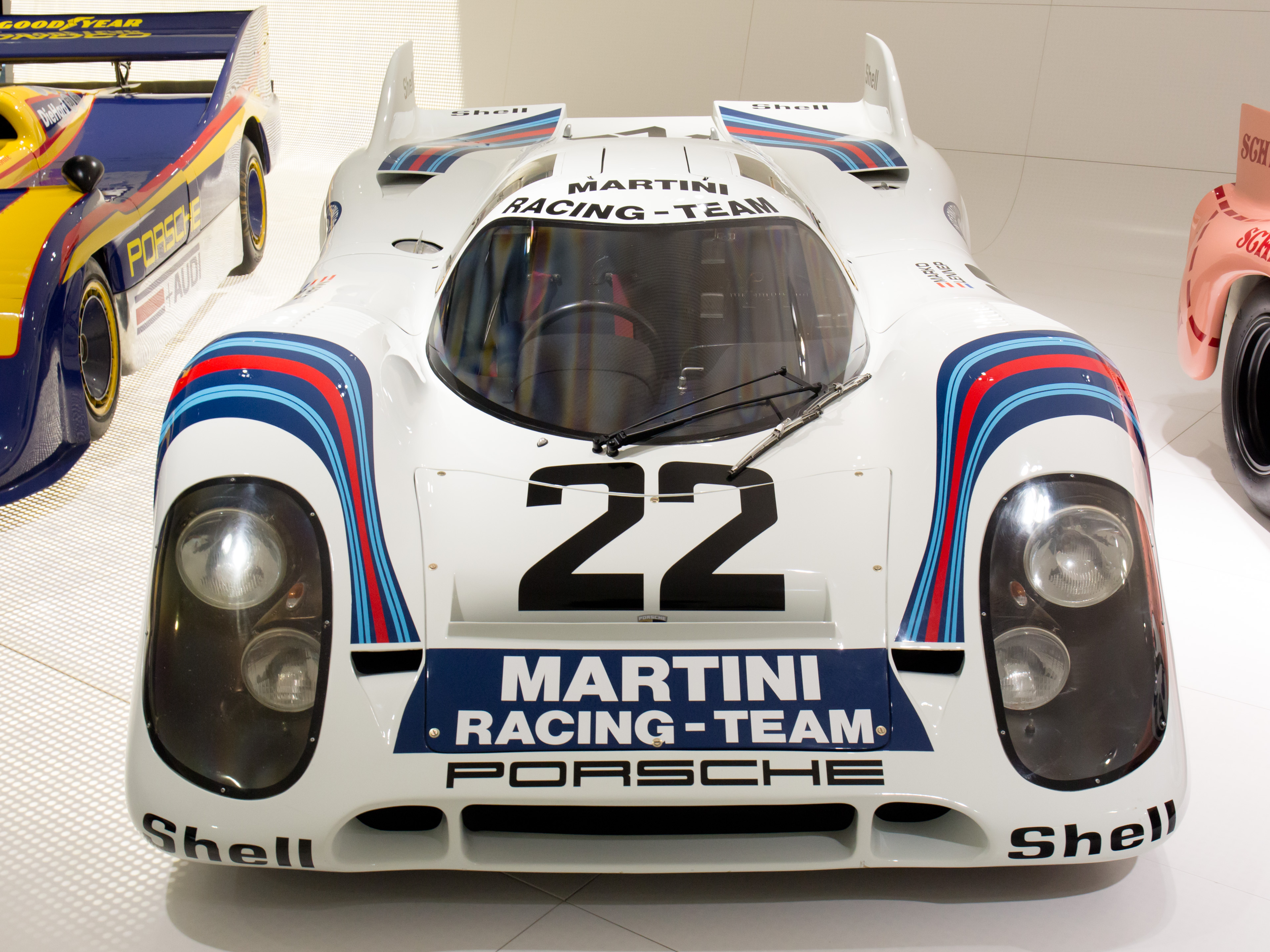
Porsche have won the race a record 19 times as a manufacturer, including with the Porsche 917K (pictured).

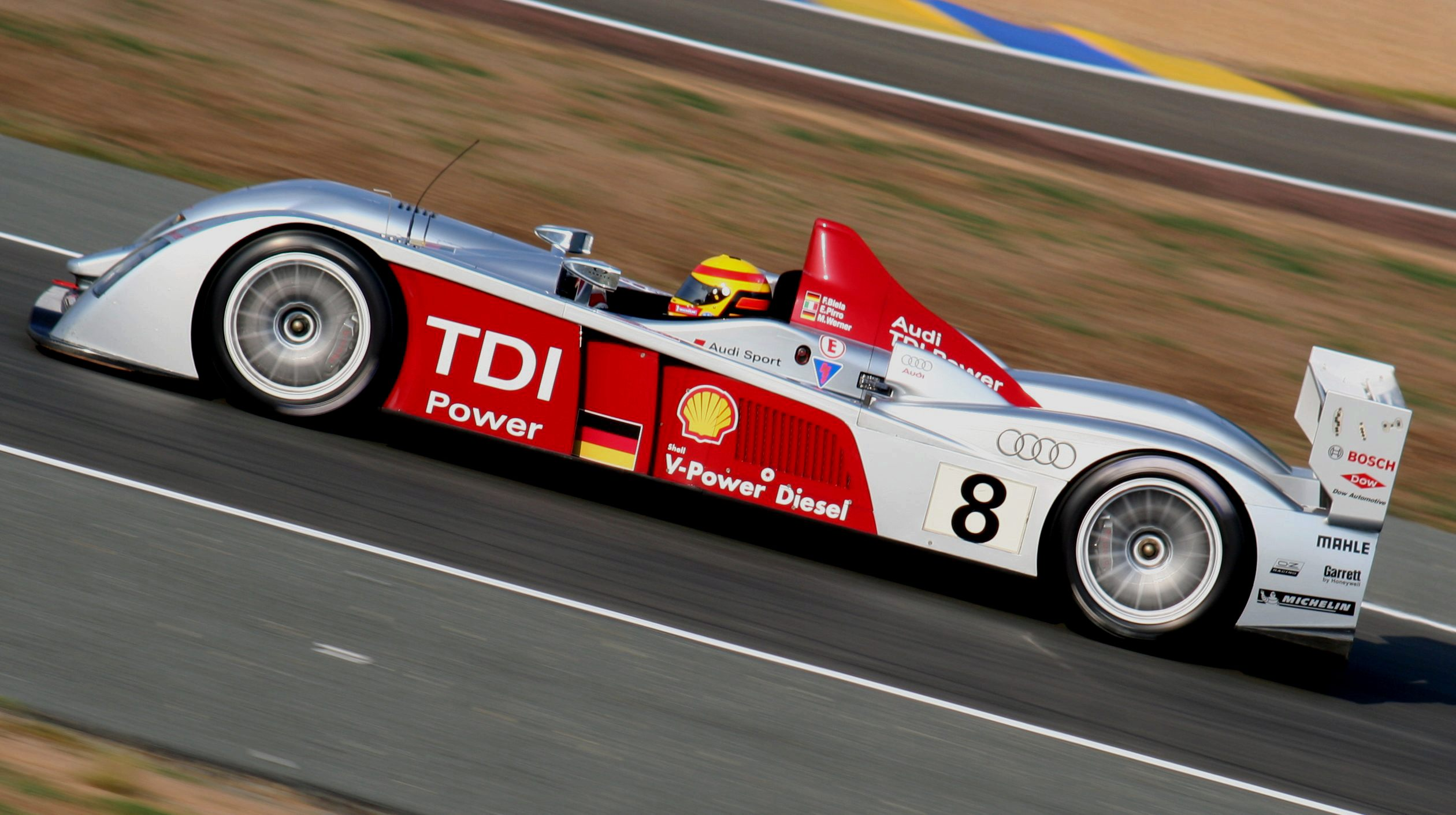
Audi have achieved victory on 13 occasions.

Wins by manufacturer
Entrant	Wins	Drivers	Years
(Germany) Porsche	19	36	1970, 1971, 1976, 1977, 1979, 1981, 1982, 1983, 1984, 1985, 1986, 1987, 1994, 1996, 1997, 1998, 2015, 2016, 2017
(Germany) Audi	13	15	2000, 2001, 2002, 2004, 2005, 2006, 2007, 2008, 2010, 2011, 2012, 2013, 2014
(Italy) Ferrari	12	23	1949, 1954, 1958, 1960, 1961, 1962, 1963, 1964, 1965, 2023, 2024, 2025
(United Kingdom) Jaguar	7	14	1951, 1953, 1955, 1956, 1957, 1988, 1990
(United Kingdom) Bentley	6	11	1924, 1927, 1928, 1929, 1930, 2003
(Japan) Toyota	6	9	2018, 2019, 2020, 2021, 2022, 2026
(Italy) Alfa Romeo	4	6	1931, 1932, 1933, 1934
(United States) Ford	4	8	1966, 1967, 1968, 1969
(France) Matra-Simca	3	3	1972, 1973, 1974
(France) Peugeot	3	9	1992, 1993, 2009
(France) Lorraine-Dietrich	2	3	1925, 1926
(France) Bugatti	2	3	1937, 1939
(France) Chenard & Walcker	1	2	1923
(United Kingdom) Lagonda	1	2	1935
(France) Delahaye	1	2	1938
(France) Talbot-Lago	1	2	1950
(Germany) Mercedes-Benz	1	2	1952
(United Kingdom) Aston Martin	1	2	1959
(United Kingdom) Mirage	1	2	1975
(France) Renault-Alpine	1	2	1978
(France) Rondeau	1	2	1980
(Switzerland) Sauber-Mercedes	1	3	1989
(Japan) Mazda	1	3	1991
(United Kingdom) McLaren	1	3	1995
(Germany) BMW	1	3	1999

As of 14 June 2026

=== By team ===
Victories by team
Team	Wins	Drivers	Years
(Germany) Joest Racing	15	22	1984, 1985, 1996, 1997, 2000, 2001, 2002, 2006, 2007, 2008, 2010, 2011, 2012, 2013, 2014
(Germany) Porsche	12	21	1976, 1977, 1981, 1982, 1983, 1986, 1987, 1994, 1998, 2015, 2016, 2017
(Italy) Scuderia Ferrari	7	9	1954, 1958, 1960, 1961, 1962, 1963, 1964
(Japan) Toyota Racing	6	9	2018, 2019, 2020, 2021, 2022, 2026
(United Kingdom) Bentley	5	9	1927, 1928, 1929, 1930, 2003
(United Kingdom) Jaguar	3	6	1951, 1953, 1955
(France) Matra Sports	3	3	1972, 1973, 1974
(Germany) Martini Racing	3	5	1971, 1976, 1977
(France) Peugeot Sport	3	9	1992, 1993, 2009
(Italy) AF Corse	3	9	2023, 2024, 2025
(France) Société Lorraine De Dietrich et Cie	2	3	1925, 1926
(France) Raymond Sommer	2	3	1932, 1933
(United Kingdom) Ecurie Ecosse	2	3	1956, 1957
(United States) Shelby American Inc.	2	4	1966, 1967
(United Kingdom) J. W. Automotive Engineering	2	4	1968, 1969
(United Kingdom) Tom Walkinshaw Racing	2	6	1988, 1990
(France) Chenard & Walcker SA	1	2	1923
(United Kingdom) Duff & Aldington	1	2	1924
(United Kingdom) Earl Howe	1	2	1931
(Italy) Luigi Chinetti/Philippe Étancelin	1	2	1934
(United Kingdom) Fox & Nichol	1	2	1935
(France) Roger Labric	1	2	1937
(France) Eugène Chaboud et Jean Trémoulet	1	2	1938
(France) Jean-Pierre Wimille	1	2	1939
(United Kingdom) Lord Selsdon	1	2	1949
(France) Louis Rosier	1	2	1950
(United Kingdom) Peter Walker	1	2	1951
(Germany) Daimler-Benz A.G.	1	2	1952
(United Kingdom) David Brown Racing Dept.	1	2	1959
(United States) North American Racing Team	1	3	1965
(Austria) Porsche KG Salzburg	1	2	1970
(United Kingdom) Gulf Research Racing Co.	1	2	1975
(France) Alpine Renault	1	2	1978
(Germany) Porsche Kremer Racing	1	2	1979
(France) Jean Rondeau	1	2	1980
(Switzerland) Team Sauber Mercedes	1	3	1989
(Japan) Mazdaspeed Co. Ltd	1	3	1991
(United Kingdom) Kokusai Kaihatsu Racing	1	3	1995
(Germany) Team BMW Motorsport	1	3	1999
(Japan) Team Goh	1	3	2004
(United States) Champion Racing	1	3	2005

As of 14 June 2026

== Bibliography ==
- Hurel, François (2002). Alpine at Le Mans: 1963–1995. Translated by Waldron, David. Nîmes, Gard: Editions du Palmier. ISBN 978-2-914920-00-1 – via Open Library.
- Hurel, François (2004). Matra au Mans [Matra at Le Mans] (in French). Nîmes, Gard: Editions du Palmier. ISBN 978-2-914920-31-5 – via Open Library.
- Long, Brian (2008). Porsche Racing Cars – 1976 to 2005. Poundbury, Dorchester, Dorset: Veloce Publishing. ISBN 978-1-904788-45-4.
- Vergeer, Koen (2009). Le Mans: geïllustreerde editie [Le Mans: illustrated edition] (in Dutch). Amsterdam, Netherlands: AmstelSport. ISBN 978-90-482-0026-9 – via Open Library.
- Wagstaff, Ian (2011). Audi R8. Poundbury, Dorchester, Dorset: Veloce Publishing. ISBN 978-1-84584-327-4 – via Open Library.
- O'Kane, Philip (2012). "A History of the 'Triple Crown' of Motor Racing: The Indianapolis 500, the Le Mans 24 Hours and the Monaco Grand Prix". In Hassan, David (ed.). The History of Motor Sport: A Case Study Analysis. Abingdon, Oxfordshire: Routledge. ISBN 978-0-415-67788-2 – via Open Library.
- Spurring, Quentin (2015). Le Mans 1923–29: The Official History of the World's Greatest Motor Race. Yeovil, Somerset: Haynes Publishing. ISBN 978-1-91050-508-3.
- Leffingwell, Randy (2017). Porsche 70 Years: There Is No Substitute. Minneapolis, United States: Motorbooks. ISBN 978-0-7603-4725-6.
- Spurring, Quentin (2017). Le Mans 1930–39: The Official History of the World's Greatest Motor Race. Sherborne, Dorset: Evro Publishing. ISBN 978-1-91050-513-7.
- Smale, Glen (2021). Porsche at Le Mans: 70 Years. Minneapolis, United States: Motorbooks. ISBN 978-0-7603-6905-0.
