= 1926 24 Hours of Le Mans =

4th 24 Hours of Le Mans endurance race

Previous: 1925	Next: 1927
Index: Races | Winners

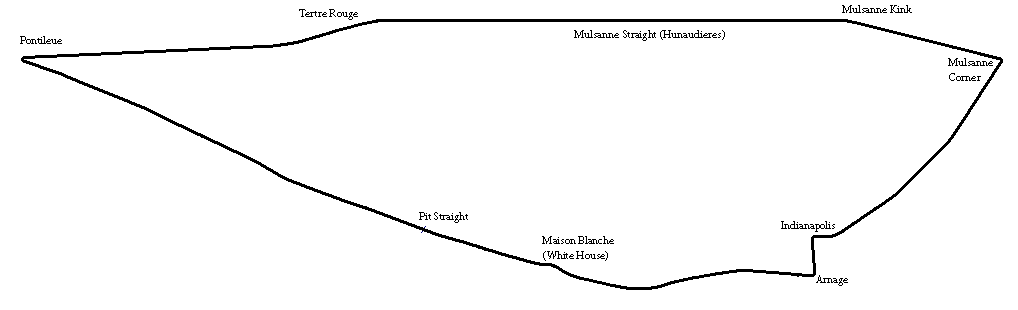
Le Mans in 1926

The 1926 24 Hours of Le Mans was the 4th Grand Prix of Endurance, and took place on 12 and 13 June 1926. It was the first Le Mans race where the winner's average speed was over 100 km/h (62 mph), and also the first to break the 24-hour distance record set by Selwyn Edge at Brooklands in 1907.

This year saw the entry of the Peugeot works team, after strong success elsewhere in touring and grand prix racing. Their competition would come from defending distance victors Lorraine-Dietrich and Bentley. Chenard-Walcker was a notable absentee, after being the pacesetter in the early years. The start/finish line and pits returned to its original point and extensive building of grandstands and spectator facilities was undertaken.

From the start the Peugeots set the pace chased by the Bentleys and Lorraines. As the others encountered mechanical issues, the experienced Lorraine drivers built a strong 1–2 lead that was never headed. A late charge by Bentley ended in the last hour when Sammy Davis could not stop in time and put the car into the sandbank at the end of the Mulsanne Straight.

First on distance was Robert Bloch and André Rossignol (repeating his 1925 triumph). Lorraine-Dietrich was just beaten to the Biennial Cup prize by the Italian Officine Meccaniche team, who won on a countback.

== Regulations ==
The process for deciding the winners had been problematic. The Triennial Cup was only run the once and the calculation for the Biennial Cup was still difficult. Therefore, the Automobile Club de l'Ouest (ACO) came up with a new competition. The Index of Performance instead used the ratio of exceeding a car's designated target distance instead of the absolute number of laps. For the track position on the final lap after exactly 24 hours, the distance would be calculated using the average speed of the car in the time after reaching its target. With engine improvements, the targets distances were again modified:

Engine size	1925 Minimum laps	1926 Minimum laps	Required Average speed
3000cc	118	120	86.3 km/h (53.6 mph)
2000cc	108	113	81.3 km/h (50.5 mph)
1500cc	99	107	77.0 km/h (47.8 mph)
1100cc	91	99	71.2 km/h (44.2 mph)

The competition was boosted by a substantial prize of FF10000 from Grand Garage Saint-Didier, the large Parisian car-dealership that had entered the Chrysler car in the previous year's race.

Manufacturers now only needed to have produced 10 of a model to be eligible to race them. Cars needed to be running at the end of the 24 hours, and complete their final lap in a maximum of 30 minutes. The ACO dictated the pit sequence, where pit-crew could assist the drivers – doing refuelling, adding oil, water, and then changing tyres and wheels before getting onto other mechanical work. The tools used had to have been carried on the car. Smoking was also now prohibited in the pits and fire extinguishers had to be carried on each car.

Further, to assist with safety, marshals were stationed around the track with blue and yellow flags. A held blue flag warned the driver to hold his current path, and when waved, to slow down. The yellow flag told the drivers to stop immediately. At night lights were fitted with blue or yellow filters.

== The Track ==
The day after the 1925 race, the landowners on Les Raineries side of the track approached the ACO with a more reasonable offer to sell the land. Once the deal was done, with the assistance of the local civic authorities, the organisation began a comprehensive building program. Permanent wooden pits and a 3000-seat grandstand were erected, as well as a well and toilet block. The race-control tower was rebuilt and the pits equipped with telephones, electricity and running water. Several cafés were set up, complete with electric table lamps and white-suited waitering staff, for the spectators’ refreshment. The car parks were extended to accommodate 3000 vehicles and road access improved, and footbridges built by the pits, Pontlieue hairpin and near Maison Blanche.

The main road south, the Ligne Droit or Mulsanne Straight was tar-sealed. The Pontlieue hairpin and the stretch from Arnage to the pits were treated with lime to harden the surface.

== Entries ==
Although 60 cars had originally been entered, only 44 actually arrived for scrutineering. There were 16 spots reserved for the qualifiers of the 1925-6 Biennial Cup, but again not all were taken up with Chenard-Walcker, Sunbeam and Diatto not present.

Category	Entries	Classes
Large-sized engines	15 / 12	over 2-litre
Medium-sized engines	23 / 23	1.1 to 2-litre
Small-sized engines	10 / 6	up to 1.1-litre
Total entrants	48 / 41	

- Note: The first number is the number of arrivals, the second the number who started.

The previous year's winners, La Lorraine-Dietrich arrived with a strong team of three cars. This year's version of the B3-6 Sport had a strengthened chassis with a torpédo bodystyle. With weight-savings, the engine could push the car to 150 kp/h (95 mph) with its 3-speed gearbox. The driver crew was largely unchanged. The 1925 winners were split: André Rossignol with Robert Bloch and Gérard de Courcelles with Marcel Mongin. The third car was again driven by Brisson and Stalter.

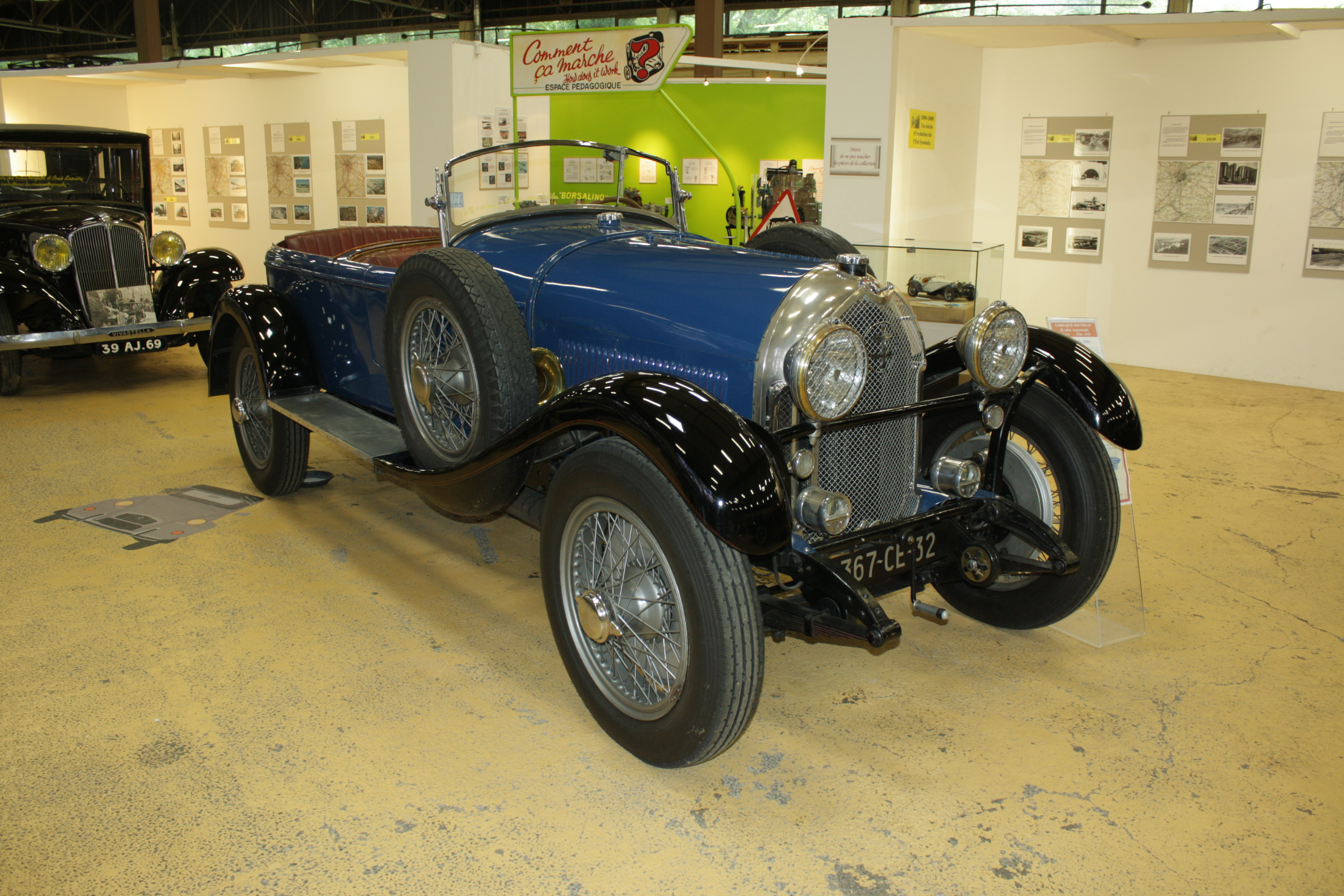
Lorraine Dietrich B3 6 Sport

France's biggest car-manufacturer, Peugeot, arrived at Le Mans for the first time this year. Pre-war, it made up nearly half of French production and brought the greatest racing successes. The 174 Sport had carried on that trend in the 1920s. The big 3.8-litre sleeve-valve engine put out over 110 bhp. Two cars were entered for their experienced works drivers; André Boillot and Louis Rigal in were in one, and veteran Louis Wagner and Christian Dauvergne were in the other.

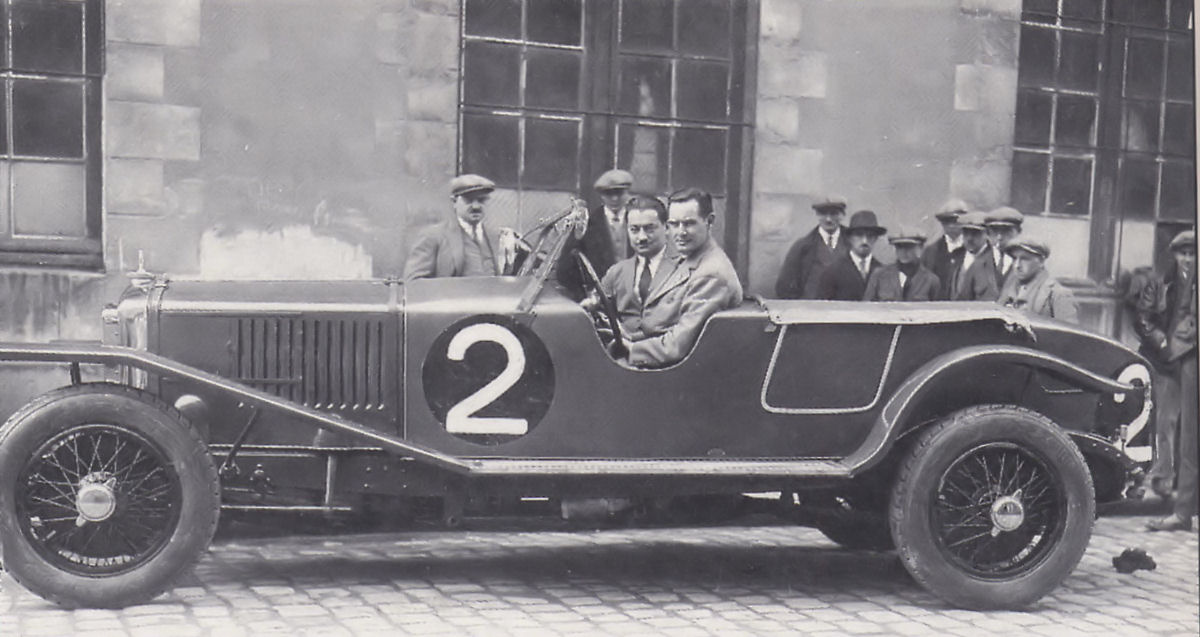
Peugeot 174 Sport of Boillot/Rigal

Bentley came to Le Mans with renewed hope of a better showing. In financial difficulties, the company had been recently bailed out by Woolf Barnato, heir to a South African mining fortune. With £10,0000 (over £5.3 million in 2026), his investment company, Baromans, bought up a controlling share of Bentley and Barnato became the chairman. The company had been trying to break 24-hour records without success. Two works 3-litre Speed models were entered. Driven by Frank Clement/George Duller and doctor Dudley Benjafield with journalist Sammy Davis, they became the kernel of the “Bentley Boys” works team. A third car, a new short-wheelbase 3-litre Super Sport, was privately entered by wealthy, 21-year old gentleman-driver Arthur “Tommy” Thistlethwayte. Bentley mechanic Les Pennel came up with a new way to carry the 180 kg compulsory “passenger ballast”. Rather than using sandbags, which rolled around and dried out over time, he installed steel tubes filled with lead of an equivalent weight. Bolted to the front and rear of the car, they gave better weight distribution and handling.

Ariès again bought four cars to Le Mans. The new surbaissée version of the 3-litre GP2 model had a distinctive, streamlined “tank” body-styling. Team principal Baron Charles Petiet this year was able to get Jean Chassagne as a driver to replace Louis Wagner, who had gone to Peugeot. A pre-war French racing hero and veteran of three Indy 500s he was paired with his former riding mechanic, now team-driver, Robert Laly. The other 3-litre was a “boat-tail” GP3 variant for Arthur Duray/Charles Flohot. As before, they also entered a pair of “Super” versions of the 1.1-litre CC2 car.

Charles Montier and his Ford-based specials, runners in the first three Le Mans, did not return. However, another American company arrived at Le Mans this year. John Willys had bought Overland Automobile in 1907, renaming it Willys-Automotive in 1912; by 1915, it was the second-biggest American car manufacturer behind Ford. It built cars under both the Overland and Willys-Knight names. Their French agent, Henri Falconnet, entered three cars in the race. The biggest-engined car in the field was the Willys-Knight 66 Great Six: the 3.9-litre sleeve-valve engine put out 65 bhp that got it up to 110 kp/h (70 mph) and had Paul Gros (ex-Bignan) and Paul Leduc (ex-Talbot) as its drivers. The new Overlands had 2.8-litre sleeve-valve engines generating 40 bhp and both a hard-top and coupé version arrived.

The Italian Officine Meccaniche (OM) team was back after a very positive debut the previous year. The Tipo 665S had been substantially upgraded, with a much lighter and lower chassis. This year, the Grand Prix drivers “Nando” Minoia and Giulio Foresti were paired together, with the Danieli brothers and Renato Balestrero/Frédéric Thelusson in the others.

Théophile Schneider was a pre-war auto-manufacturer that was getting back into motor-racing. The 25 SP was a development of its 1922 model, with success commercially and in racing. Its 2-litre engine was race-tuned to get it up to 140 kp/h (85 mph). Majority shareholder Robert Poirier drove one car for the race with Antonin Fontaine with another run by Auguste Lefranc/Pierre Tobourin. The other new team was from Jousset – a coach-building company, from near Limoges in provincial France, that had just started building cars in 1924. Two variants of its M1 design were entered: one was a hardtop saloon, and the other a convertible tourer with boat-tail chassis. The 1.5-litre CIME engine put out 50 bhp giving it a top speed of 140 kp/h (90 mph).

Henri Précloux returned to Le Mans this year with three cars. Two were of his smaller 1.2-litre DS models of standard saloons with CIME engines. The other was a special streamlined version of the larger 1.5-litre DT model. Entered for the Biennial Cup, it had a similar “tank”’ bodywork to the Ariès. Salmson had re-established its works racing team in 1925, and returned to Le Mans with three cars. Two were the successful “Grand Sport” development of the VAL-3 two-seater. Its 1.1-litre double-overhead cam engine developed 27 bhp pushing the car up to 120 kp/h (75 mph). They also brought along a larger 4-seater, the 1.2-litre D2 tourer.

Other race regulars Corre La Licorne presented three different cars this year. One was its regular V16 model with the 1425cc SCAP engine. Another was a new model – the G6 – with a new 6-cylinder 1.5-litre engine of their own design. It was fitted in a low-profile bonnetline with an underslung, surbaissée chassis. The third car had the new engine fitted into a standard V16.

== Practice ==
The roads were closed for race practice over the Friday night from 10pm till 6am on Saturday. The Henneguet/Aladame hardtop Overland had an accident and fire during practice and could not be repaired in time to take the start.

== Race ==
=== Start ===
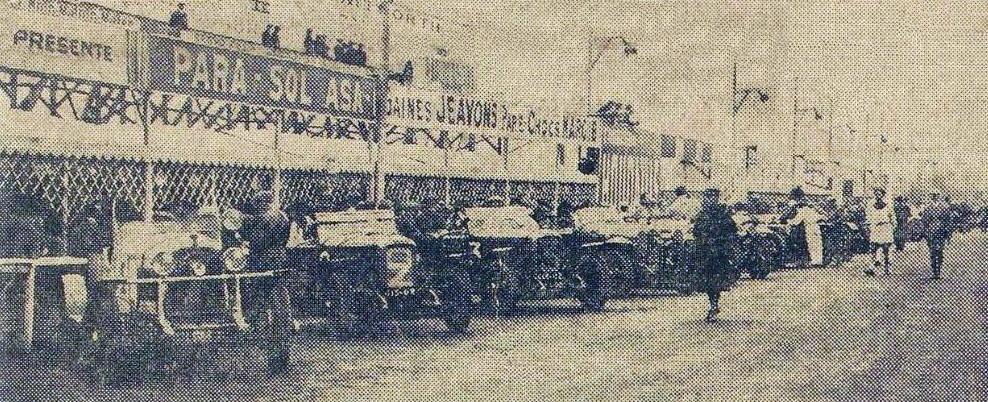
Lined up for the start

After two years of blazing sunshine the weather over race-week was terrible, with heavy rain every day. However, by Saturday it was overcast and clearing with only occasional showers encouraging a record crowd to attend. First car away was the Jousset saloon – as it had no hood to put up! But in front at the first time around was Boillot's Peugeot, with a handy 300 metre lead over the works Bentleys (Clement and Davis), themselves well ahead of the privateer Bentley, Bloch's Lorraine-Dietrich and Wagner in the other Peugeot. Bloch soon passed the Bentleys and closed in on Boillot though he did not have enough power to overtake him. The two big Ariès had been last away from the start, the drivers being meticulous assembling their hoods. However, after an hour they had caught up with the leading group with Laly getting up to sixth and Flohot ninth. Georges Irat had missed the 1925 race but returned with two cars this year. The first retirements, both were out early. For the team, four cars in two races had achieved only 55 laps put together.

After several hours, and 20 laps, the first pit-stops were due and first to stop was the Jousset hard-top – the new team finding their cars disturbingly heavy on fuel-consumption. After the driver-changes, it was the Bentleys which took the fight to the Boillot/Rigal Peugeot. George Duller set a new lap record and passed Rigal on the 26th lap. But he then overshot the Arnage corner and lost 20 minutes and two laps digging himself out of the sandbank. In the laborious work of digging himself out Duller had taken off his helmet and for several laps the car was in danger of being disqualified as drivers were not allowed to race without crash-helmets. Fearing he had dropped it roadside, it was only when he was finally convinced to pit that it was found in the seat next to him. The Bentley's speed also spurred on the Lorraine-Dietrich team, as Bloch overtook Rigal in the twilight to take the lead. Accelerating out of Pontlieue hairpin, a blowback set Duray's engine on fire. With good presence of mind, he quickly parked and put the fire extinguisher onto it. The Ariès was out of the race, but the car was saved.

=== Night ===
Going into the night, the Corre La Licorne of Waldemar Lestienne arrived in the pits with its left mudguard bent over the bonnet, the wheel knocked out of alignment and its rearbumper trailing along the ground. The driver was claiming he had been squeezed off the road into a ditch by another car. Then soon after, as de Courcelles was closing onto the tail of Dauvergne in the second Peugeot, they came up behind the EHP “tank” to lap it. The 1.5-litre EHP would not make way and both the Peugeot and Lorraine spun off the road avoiding it. Dauvergne lost time getting his Peugeot out of the ditch and both teams lodged protests with the officials about the unsporting driving, but the EHP's engine expired soon after anyway.

At midnight the Lorraine had done 48 laps (four more than at the same time the previous year) and held a one-lap lead over the two Peugeots, the next Lorraine and the remaining Ariès between the two Bentleys. At 1am the Ariès tank pitted for a driver-change and refuelling. But Chassagne could not get the car restarted. He found the generator had not been recharging and the battery was flat. As only an electrical starter was allowed to be used, and no pushing or hand-cranking, it had to be retired.

So, by the halfway point at 4am, the Bloch and Rossignol still had a one-lap lead (73 laps) over their teammate and the Boillot/Rigal Peugeot (72). The other Peugeot and Thistlethwayte's Bentley were two laps further back with the third Lorraine (69) in sixth. Next were the two works Bentleys (68) with the two Italian OMs leading the 2-litre class rounding out the top-10 (66 & 65 laps). But from there, it only got worse for Peugeot. At 9pm, the Boillot/Rigal car had been delayed when a windscreen stay had broken, then the glass fell out. When the officials required it to be repaired but there was no spare, the car was disqualified. In the early hours the other car's battery went flat and when Wagner reversed up the pit to try and bump-start it, he was also disqualified – much to the disapproval of the spectators.

After his delay in the sandbank, Duller had been pushing hard through the night to catch up again. But the Bentley's charge came to an end with a broken valve as dawn approached.

=== Morning ===
By 8am there were only 23 cars left running. The Rossignol/Bloch Lorraine now had a two-lap lead over his teammate, itself holding a three-lap lead over the two Bentleys and the other Lorraine. The two OMs were next, still leading the 2-litre class from Clause's Bignan in eighth. The Dumont/Duprez Overland was ninth with the Tabourin/Lefranc Schneider completing the top-ten. An hour later, Gallop brought the privateer Bentley into the pits running on three cylinders to retire because of a broken rocker-arm forcing its retirement. Dudley Benjafield then really picked up the pace of the remaining Bentley, closing in on the Lorraines ahead by as much as twenty seconds a lap. Sammy Davis carried on the furious pursuit into the afternoon. Realising the danger, both Mongin and then de Courcelles lifted the second-placed car's pace too, breaking the lap record by seven seconds.

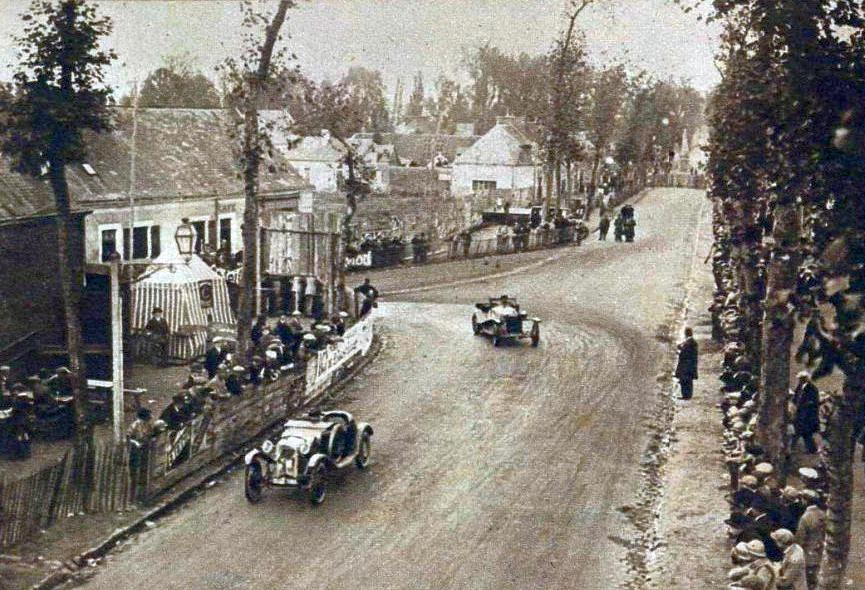
Exiting Pontieue hairpin

=== Finish and post-race ===
With half an hour to go Davis caught and passed Mongin on the Mulsanne straight. But the hard chase had worn down the Bentley's brakes and he arrived at the sharp Mulsanne corner too fast and pitched the Bentley into the sandbank. Sportingly, Mongin stopped to check Davis was okay but was not allowed to lend assistance. Unable to be extricated in time, the car could not be classified. Also, in the last hour Renato Balestrero in the third OM, was called in by the officials. He had to explain why he had stopped on the Mulsanne Straight after midday to pick up some tools which was not permitted conveniently left by an OM mechanic. Not surprisingly, disqualification was the result.

Brisson and Stalter inherited third place and the Lorraine-Dietrich team finished with an emphatic 1-2-3 finish, giving André Rossignol back-to-back victories on distance. The two OMs were fourth and fifth on the road, and also won the lucrative 1925-6 Biennial Cup by the slimmest of margins. It left the Lorraine-Dietrich team furious with the officials. This was because the Index of Performance was now counted as a ratio rather than absolute laps. Mongin's pace versus the Bentley meant he had to pit for a fuel top-up in the last hour, so his average speed on his excess laps was compromised. Unfortunately, their leading car was the one not entered into the Biennial Cup. It did set a distance record however - the equivalent of crossing the Atlantic Ocean in 24 hours, from Ireland to Newfoundland.

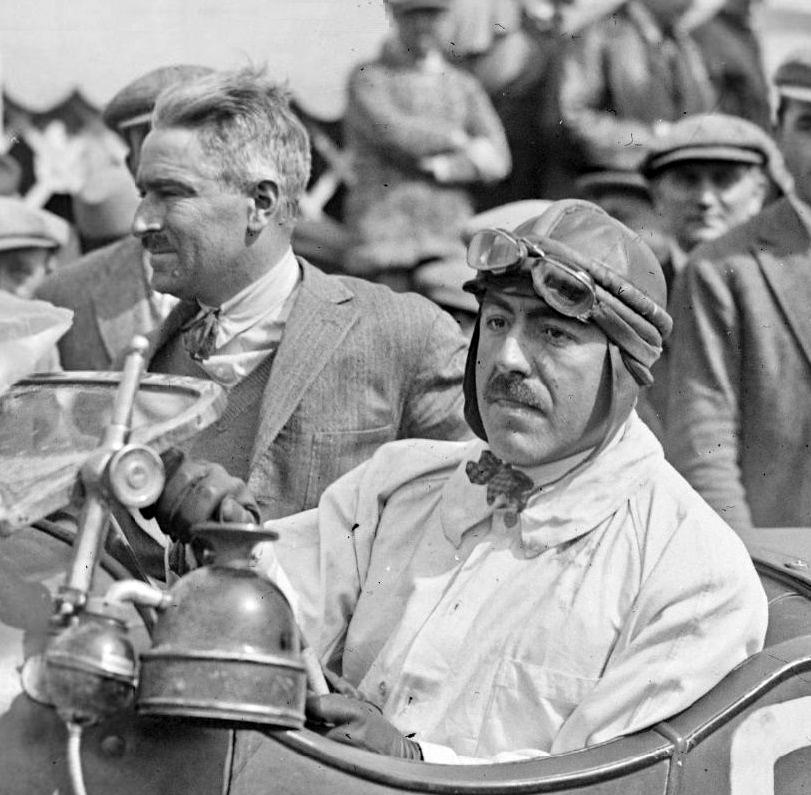
Race-winners Bloch & Rossignol

The American Overland had moved up to sixth into the last hour when it pulled into the pits to retire, only two laps short of its target. The two SARA cars both finished, in 11th and 12th, both easily exceeding their target distances. The leading one, of regular team drivers Marandet and Lécureul was the only 1100cc finisher in the 1925-36 Biennial Cup. Even though it was not classified, the lead Bentley had still met its minimum distance to qualify for the next Biennial Cup. Both Duller and Mongin were fined FF200 for racing at some time without a helmet on during the race.

The race was set as an endurance trial to improve the technology and reliability of touring cars. However, it also extended to motoring in general: the road resurfacing had greatly improved overall race-speed (the three Lorraines all exceeded an average speed of 100 km/h over the 24 hours). Tyre technology was also improving with virtually all the cars staying on their same original set of tyres. Only three tyres had to be replaced in the whole race.

It proved to be a bad year for the saturated French touring-car market with a number of smaller manufacturers struggling and forced to close. These included Ravel, Bignan and Jousset For other teams this was their last Le Mans as they chose to consolidate, including Georges Irat, Corre La Licorne, Rolland-Pilain and Overland, as well as the victors Lorraine-Dietrich and Officine Meccaniche.

== Official results ==
=== Finishers ===
Results taken from Quentin Spurring's book, officially licensed by the ACO Although there were no official engine classes, the highest finishers in unofficial categories aligned with the Index targets are in Bold text.

Pos	Class ***	No.	Team	Drivers	Chassis	Engine	Tyre	Target distance*	Laps	Index score
1	**5.0**	**6**	**(France) Société Lorraine De Dietrich** **et Cie**	**(France) André Rossignol** **(France) Robert Bloch**	Lorraine-Dietrich B3-6 Le Mans	Lorraine-Dietrich 3.4L S6	D	122	148	1.213
2	5.0	5	(France) Société Lorraine De Dietrich et Cie	(France) Gérard de Courcelles (France) Marcel Mongin	Lorraine-Dietrich B3-6 Le Mans	Lorraine-Dietrich 3.4L S6	D	122 [B]	147	1.200
3	5.0	4	(France) Société Lorraine De Dietrich et Cie	(France) Édouard Brisson (France) Henri Stalter	Lorraine-Dietrich B3-6 Le Mans	Lorraine-Dietrich 3.4L S6	D	122 [B]	139	1.130
4	**2.0**	**17**	**(Italy) Officine Meccaniche**	**(Italy) Ferdinando Minoia** **(Italy) Giulio Foresti**	O.M. Tipo 665S Superba	O.M. 1998cc S6	P	113 [B]	135	1.201
5	2.0	18	(Italy) Officine Meccaniche	(Italy) Mario Danieli (Italy) Tino Danieli	O.M. Tipo 665S Superba	O.M. 1998cc S6	P	113 [B]	131	1.158
6	2.0	27	(France) Automobiles Th.Schneider SA	(France) Pierre Tabourin (France) Auguste Lefranc	Th.Schneider 25 SP	Th.Schneider 1954cc S4	MI	112	118	1.053
7	2.0	21	(France) Établissements Automobiles; Rolland et Pilain SA	(France) Aimé Nezeloff (France) Jean Lassalle	Rolland-Pilain C23 Super Sport	Rolland-Pilain 1997cc S4	MI	113	118	1.044
N/C **	3.0	15	(France) Henri Falconnet Paris	(France) Maurice Dumont (France) Maurice Deprez	Overland Six 93	Overland 2.8L S6	E	119	117	-
8	**1.5**	**37**	**(France) Établissements Henri Précloux**	**(France) Henri de Costier** **(France) Pierre Bussienne**	E.H.P. Type DS	CIME 1204cc S4	D	101	111	1.099
9	**1.1**	**46**	**(France) Société des Moteurs Salmson**	**(France) Georges Casse** **(France) André Rousseau**	Salmson Grand Sport	Salmson 1094cc S4	E	99	111	1.121
10	1.5	33	(France) Société Française des Automobiles Corre	(France) Jean Errecaldé (France) André Galoisy	Corre-La Licorne V16 10CV Sport	SCAP 1425cc S4	D	107	109	1.018
N/C **	2.0	20	(France) Établissements Automobiles; Rolland et Pilain SA	(France) Gaston Delalande (France) Louis Sire	Rolland-Pilain C23 Super Sport	Rolland-Pilain 1997cc S4	MI	113 [B]	109	-
11	1.1	42	(France) Société des Applications à Refroidissements par Air	(France) André Marandet (France) Gonzaque Lécureul	SARA BDE	SARA 1099cc S4	E	99 [B]	109	1.096
12	1.1	43	(France) Société des Applications à Refroidissements par Air	(France) Gaston Duval (France) Henri Armand	SARA BDE	SARA 1099cc S4	E	99	104	1.050
N/C **	1.5	35	(France) Automobiles Louis Ravel SA	(Belgium) Paul van Cuyck (France) Roger Camuzet	Ravel Type C	Ravel 1.5L I4	D	106	102	-
13	1.1	49	(France) Société des Automobile; Ariès	(France) Fernand Gabriel (France) Louis Paris	Ariès CC2 Super	Ariès 1045cc S4	D	99	102	1.030
N/C **	1.5	30	(France) Automobiles Jousset SA	(France) Léon Molon (France) Lucien Molon	Jousset M1 Berline	CIME 1496cc S4	E	107	101	-

=== Did Not Finish ===
Pos	Class ***	No	Team	Drivers	Chassis	Engine	Tyre	Target distance*	Laps	Reason
DNF	3.0	7	(United Kingdom) Bentley Motors Limited	(United Kingdom) Sammy Davis (United Kingdom) Dr Dudley Benjafield	Bentley 3 Litre Speed	Bentley 3.0L S4	D	120	137	Accident (24 hr)
DNF	2.0	25	(France) Établissements Industriels; Jacques Bignan	(France) Pierre Clause (France) Georges Gautier	Bignan 2 Litre Sport	Bignan 1984cc S4	E	112 [B]	112	Engine (afternoon)
DNF	3.0	9	(United Kingdom) Bentley Motors Limited (United Kingdom) T. Thistlethwayte (private entrant)	(United Kingdom) Tommy Thistlethwayte (United Kingdom) Clive Gallop	Bentley 3 Litre Super Sport	Bentley 3.0L S4	D	120	105	Engine (17 hr)
DSQ	2.0	19	(Italy) Officine Meccaniche	(Italy) Renato Balestrero (France) Frédéric Thelusson	O.M. Tipo 665S Superba	O.M. 1998cc S6	P	113	94	Outside assistance (24 hr)
DSQ	5.0	2	(France) Société des Automobiles Peugeot	(France) André Boillot (France) Louis Rigal	Peugeot Type 174 Sport	Peugeot 3.8L S4	D	123	82	Broken windscreen (13 hr)
DSQ	5.0	3	(France) Société des Automobiles Peugeot	(France) Louis Wagner (France) Christian Dauvergne	Peugeot Type 174 Sport	Peugeot 3.8L S4	D	123	76	Starter (night)
DNF	3.0	8	(United Kingdom) Bentley Motors Limited	(United Kingdom) George Duller (United Kingdom) Frank Clement	Bentley 3 Litre Speed	Bentley 3.0L S4	D	120	72	Engine (13 hr)
DNF	3.0	10	(France) Société des Automobile Ariès	(France) Jean Chassagne (France) Robert Laly	Ariès Type S GP2 Surbaissée	Ariès 3.0L S4	D	120 [B]	65	Flat battery (9 hr)
DNF	1.5	29	(France) Automobiles Jousset SA	(France) René Bonneau (France) Raymond Saladin	Jousset M1 Tourisme	CIME 1496cc S4	E	107	64	Radiator (morning)
DNF	1.5	38	(France) Établissements Henri Précloux	(France) Marcel Ballot (France) Philippe Morac	E.H.P. Type DS	CIME 1204cc S4	D	101	62	Accident (morning)
DNF	2.0	26	(France) Automobiles Th.Schneider SA	(France) Robert Poirier (France) Antonin Fontaine	Th.Schneider 25 SP	Th.Schneider 1954cc S4	MI	112	61	Accident (dawn)
DNF	1.5	39	(France) Société des Moteurs Salmson	(France) Lionel de Marmier (France) Jean Sachot	Salmson Type D2	Salmson 1193cc S4	E	101	54	Accident (dawn)
DNF	2.0	22	(France) Établissements Automobiles; Rolland et Pilain SA	(France) Paul Chalamel (France) Paul Stremler	Rolland-Pilain C23 Super Sport	Rolland-Pilain 1997cc S4	MI	113	53	? (dawn)
DSQ	1.5	36	(France) Automobiles Louis Ravel SA	(France) Georges Kling (France) Pierre Rey	Ravel Type C	Ravel 1465cc S4	D	106	46	Insufficient distance (12 hr)
DSQ	1.5	34	(France) Automobiles Louis Ravel SA	(France) Louis Abit (France) Charles Duverger	Ravel Type C	Ravel 1465cc S4	D	106	45	Insufficient distance (12 hr)
DNF	1.1	47	(France) Société des Moteurs Salmson	(France) Jean Hasley (France) André de Victor	Salmson Grand Sport	Salmson 1094cc S4	E	99	35	Accident (9 hr)
DNF	1.5	28	(France) Établissements Henri Précloux	(France) Guy Bouriat (France) Guy Dollfuss	E.H.P. Type DT Spéciale 'Tank'	CIME 1496cc S4	D	107 [B]	34	Engine (night)
DNF	1.1	48	(France) Société des Automobile Ariès	(France) Roger Delano (France) Edmond Closset	Ariès CC2 Super	Ariès 1045cc S4	D	99	31	Accident (night)
DNF	1.5	31	(France) Société Française des Automobiles Corre	(France) Waldemar Lestienne (France) Louis Balart	Corre-La Licorne G6 Sport	Corre 1496cc S6	D	107 [B]	31	Accident (evening)
DNF	3.0	11	(France) Société des Automobile Ariès	(France) Arthur Duray (France) Charles Flohot	Ariès Type S GP3	Ariès 3.0L S4	D	120	31	Fire (evening)
DNF	1.5	32	(France) Société Française des Automobiles Corre	(France) Fernand Vallon (France) Albert Colomb	Corre-La Licorne V16/G6	Corre 1496cc S6	D	107 [B]	11	Radiator (evening)
DNF	5.0	1	(France) Henri Falconnet Paris	(France) Paul Gros (France) Paul Leduc	Willys-Knight 66 Great Six	Knight 3.9L S6	E	123	8	Fuel line (2 hr)
DNF	2.0	24	(France) Automobiles Georges Irat	(France) Léon Derny (France) Amedée Rossi	Georges-Irat Type 4A Sport	Georges Irat 1993cc S4	D	113	7	? (1 hr)
DNF	2.0	23	(France) Automobiles Georges Irat	(France) Maurice Rost (France) Edmond Burie	Georges-Irat Type 4A Sport	Georges Irat 1993cc S4	D	113	6	? (1 hr)
Sources:

- Note *: [B]= car also entered in the 1925-6 Biennial Cup.
- Note **: Not Classified because did not meet target distance.
- Note ***: There were no official class divisions for this race. These are unofficial categories (used in subsequent years) related to the Index targets.

=== Did Not Start ===
Pos	Class	No	Team	Drivers	Chassis	Engine	Reason
DNS	3.0	16	(France) Henri Falconnet Paris	(France) . Henneguet (France) . Aladame	Overland Six 93	Overland 2.8L S6	Practice accident
DNS	1.5	40	(France) Automobiles Gendron & Cie	(France) Marcel Michelot (France) Lucien Bossoutrot	GM GC3 Sport	CIME 1099cc S4	Withdrawn
DNS	1.5	41	(France) Automobiles Gendron & Cie	(France) Marcel Gendron (France) Adrien Drancé	GM GC3 Sport	CIME 1099cc S4	Withdrawn
DNA	3.0	12	(United Kingdom) Sunbeam Motor Co		Sunbeam 3 Litre Super Sports	Sunbeam 2.9L S6	Did not arrive
DNA	3.0	14	(United Kingdom) Sunbeam Motor Co		Sunbeam 3 Litre Super Sports	Sunbeam 2.9L S6	Did not arrive
DNA	1.1	44	(France) Chenard-Walcker SA	(France) André Lagache (France) René Léonard	Chenard-Walcker Z1 Spéciale	Chenard-Walcker 1095cc S4	Did not arrive
DNA	1.1	45	(France) Chenard-Walcker SA	(Belgium) André Pisart (Spain) Manso de Zúñiga	Chenard-Walcker Z1 Spéciale	Chenard-Walcker 1095cc S4	Did not arrive

=== 1925-26 Coupe Biennale Rudge-Whitworth ===
Pos	No.	Team	Drivers	Chassis	1925 Laps Over	1926 Laps Over	Team Result
1	17	(Italy) Officine Meccaniche	(Italy) Ferdinando Minoia (Italy) Giulio Foresti	O.M. Tipo 665S Superba	+13	+22	1.201
2	5	(France) Société Lorraine De Dietrich et Cie	(France) Gérard de Courcelles (France) Marcel Mongin	Lorraine-Dietrich B3-6 Le Mans	+10	+25	1.200
3	18	(Italy) Officine Meccaniche	(Italy) Mario Danieli (Italy) Tino Danieli	O.M. Tipo 665S Superba	+13	+18	1.158
4	4	(France) Société Lorraine De Dietrich et Cie	(France) Édouard Brisson (France) . Stalter	Lorraine-Dietrich B3-6 Le Mans	+6	+17	1.130
5	42	(France) Société des Applications à Refroidissements par Air	(France) André Marandet (France) Gonzaque Lécureul	SARA BDE	+3	+10	1.096

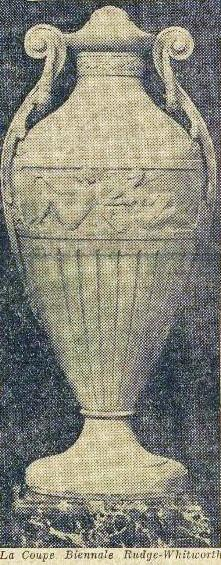
Rudge-Whitworth Biennial Cup

=== Highest Finisher in Class ===
Class	Winning car	Winning drivers
5 to 8-litre	no finishers	
3 to 5-litre	#6 Lorraine-Dietrich B3-6 Le Mans	Rossignol / Bloch *
2 to 3-litre	no finishers	
1500 to 2000cc	#17 OM Tipo 665S Superba	Minoia / Foresti *
1100 to 1500cc	#37 EHP Type DS	de Costier / Bussienne
750 to 1100cc	#46 Salmson Grand Sport	Casse / Rousseau *

- Note *: setting a new class distance record.

There were no official class divisions for this race and these are the highest finishers in unofficial categories (used in subsequent years) related to the Index targets.

=== Statistics ===
Taken from Quentin Spurring's book, officially licensed by the ACO

- Fastest Lap – G. de Courcelles, #6 Lorraine-Dietrich B3-6 Le Mans – 9:03secs; 114.44 km/h (71.11 mph)
- Longest Distance – 2,552.41 km (1,585.99 mi)
- Average Speed on Longest Distance – 106.35 km/h (66.08 mph)
