= André Rossignol =

French racing driver

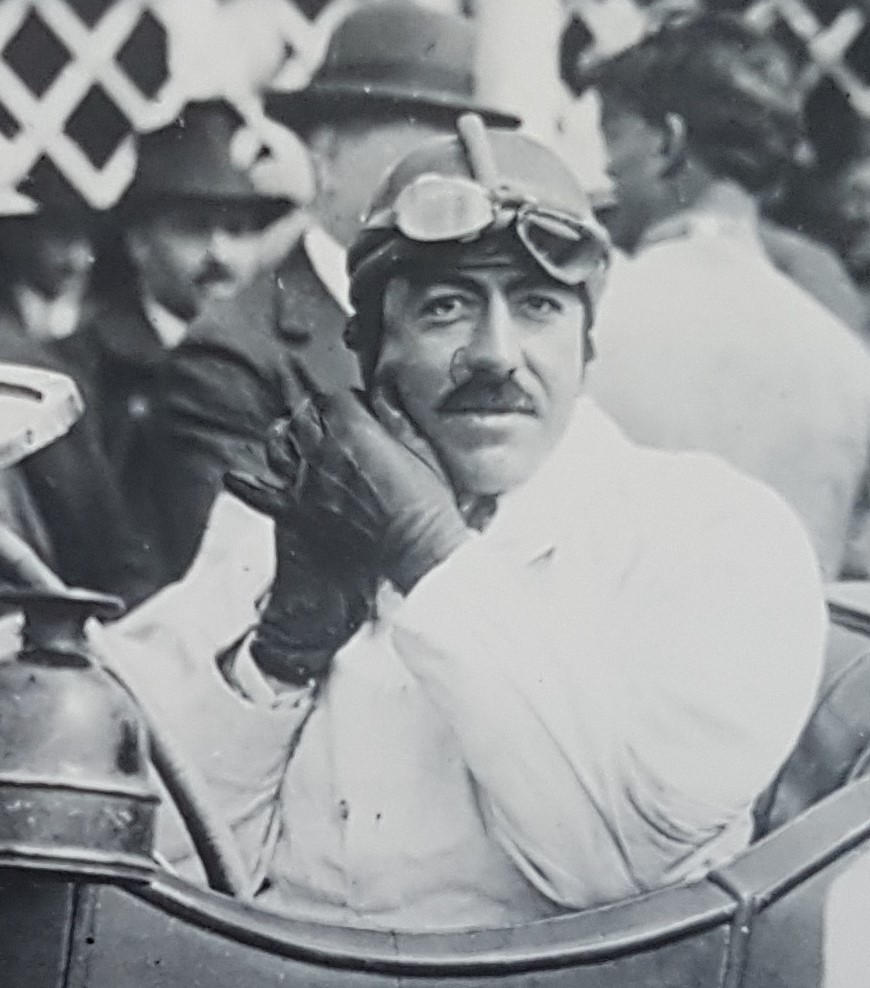
- André Rossignol at the 1926 24 Hours of Le Mans
- Nationality: (France) French
- Born: 9 August 1890; Paris (17e arrondissement)
- Died: 5 December 1960 (aged 70); Paris (16e arrondissement)

24 Hours of Le Mans career
- Years: 1923–1926, 1928
- Teams: Lorraine-Dietrich; Private entries
- Best finish: 1st (1925, 1926)
- Class wins: 3 (1923, 1925, 1926)

André Rossignol (9 August 1890, Paris - 5 December 1960, Paris) was a French racing driver who became the first driver to win the 24 Hours of Le Mans twice, winning in consecutive years.

== Career ==
Rossignol was a driver for the French Lorraine-Dietrich automobile company, and had been on their driving team since the inaugural Le Mans in 1923. After having finished eighth and third the first two years, Rossignol and teammate Gérard de Courcelles won the event overall in 1925. The following year, Robert Bloch was assigned to drive with Rossignol, and the race was won once again, with all three Lorraine-Dietrichs finishing on the podium.

After Lorraine-Dietrich chose not to enter cars in the 1927 event, Rossignol was hired by Chrysler and partnered with Henri Stoffel in the 1928 running. The two finished the race in third place. Rossignol did not participate at Le Mans again.

Rossignol also competed in the 24 Hours of Spa, finishing second in 1925 and sixth in 1928 and 1929 but won in that year's race the class 5.0 in a Chrysler 75 together with Henri Stoffel.

== Racing record ==
=== Complete 24 Hours of Le Mans results ===
Year	Team	Co-Drivers	Car	Class	Laps	Pos.	Class Pos.
1923	(France) Société Lorraine De Dietrich et Cie	(France) Gérard de Courcelles	Lorraine-Dietrich B3-6 Sport [15CV]	5.0	108	8th	1st
1924	(France) Société Lorraine De Dietrich et Cie	(France) Gérard de Courcelles	Lorraine-Dietrich B3-6 Sport	5.0	119	3rd	2nd
1925	(France) Société Lorraine De Dietrich et Cie	(France) Gérard de Courcelles	Lorraine-Dietrich B3-6 Sport	5.0	129	1st	1st
1926	(France) Société Lorraine De Dietrich et Cie	(France) Robert Bloch	Lorraine-Dietrich B3-6 Le Mans	5.0	148	1st	1st
1928	(France) Grand Garage Saint-Didier Paris	(France) Henri Stoffel	Chrysler Six Series 72	5.0	144	3rd	3rd

== Literature ==
- R. M . Clarke: Le Mans – die Bentley & Alfa Years 1923–1939 Brocklands Books 1999, ISBN 1-85520-465-7.

Sporting positions
Preceded by John Duff; Frank Clement	Winner of the 24 Hours of Le Mans; 1925 with: Gérard de Courcelles	Succeeded by André Rossignol; Robert Bloch
Preceded by André Rossignol; Gérard de Courcelles	Winner of the 24 Hours of Le Mans; 1926 with: Robert Bloch	Succeeded by Dudley Benjafield; Sammy Davis
