= E.H.P. =

E.H.P. (Établissements Henry Precloux) was a French automobile manufacturer.

== History ==
The Établissements Henry Precloux commenced building light cars in Courbevoie (Paris) in 1921. In 1926 they incorporated Automobiles Bignan. In 1929 production was halted. A company called Loryc also license-built E.H.P. cars in Spain.

== Cars ==
E.H.P. focused on small and lightweight automobiles. Originally they used a Ruby 903 cc four-cylinder, later engines from other manufacturers of up to 1.5 liters were installed. After the Bignan takeover, their 8CV cars were also offered as E.H.P.s. The 8CV was originally fitted with a 1,202 cc and 18 PS (13 kW) CIME engine, later a 20 PS and a 29 PS "Grand Sport" version were added. In 1928 the DU model appeared, fitted with an inline-six of 1,300 cc.

== Competition ==
The E.H.P. automobiles also saw much competition, participating in four 24 Hours of Le Mans races, coming in second in the 1928 "Index of Thermal Efficiency". An 1,100 cc E.H.P. driven by Boris Ivanowski also won the 1926 24-hour "Bol d'Or" race in St. Germain, with an average speed of 66.9 km/h (41.6 mph).

Le Mans record

Year	Pos	Class	No	Drivers	Chassis	Engine	Lap	Speed (km/h)
1925	14	1.5	39	Jean d'Aulan; René Dély	DT Spéciale	CIME 1,496 cc I4	103	74.435
1925	34	1.5	38	Maurice Benoist; Michel Doré	DT Spéciale	CIME 1,496 cc I4	41	DNF
1926	8	1.5	37	Henri de Costier; Pierre Bussienne	DS Grand Sport	CIME 1,202 cc I4	111	80.103
1926	27	1.5	38	"Morac"; Marcel Ballot	DS Grand Sport	CIME 1,202 cc I4	62	DNF
1926	34	1.5	28	Guy Bouriat; Guy Dollfuss	DT Tank	CIME 1,496 cc I4	34	DNF
1927	5	1.1	26	Guy Bouriat; Pierre Bussienne	DS Spécial	CIME 1,094 cc I4	108	78.105
1927	22	1.1	27	Henri De Costier; Georges Guignard	DS Spécial	CIME 1,094 cc I4	8	DNF
1928	14	1.1	36	Guy Bouriat; Pierre Bussienne	Spécial	CIME 1,094 cc I6	115	83.23
