= Robert Bloch (racing driver) =

French racing driver

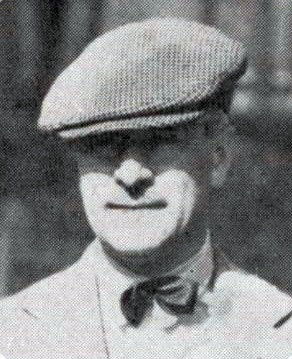
- Bloch in 1928
- Nationality: (France) French
- Born: 26 April 1888; Paris, France
- Died: 7 March 1984 (aged 95); Paris, France

24 Hours of Le Mans career
- Years: 1923–1926, 1928
- Teams: Lorraine-Dietrich; C.T. Weymann
- Best finish: 1st (1926)
- Class wins: 1 (1926)

Robert Bloch (26 April 1888 – 7 March 1984) was a French racing driver who, along with André Rossignol, won the 1926 24 Hours of Le Mans for French manufacturer Lorraine-Dietrich.

== Career ==
Bloch had been part of Lorraine-Dietrich's racing team since the inaugural 24 Hours of Le Mans in 1923, finishing this edition, but struggled to complete the distance over the next two years. Following Rossignol's initial win in 1925, Bloch was partnered with him for 1927 and the duo led a Lorraine-Dietrich dominance of the event in 1926, winning ahead of the two other entries from the company.

Bloch missed Le Mans in 1927 after Lorraine-Dietrich chose not to enter a team, but Bloch was hired by Charles Terres Weymann in 1928 to drive his privately entered Stutz Blackhawk. Bloch, with co-driver Édouard Brisson, finished the race second overall behind the factory Bentley team.

Bloch also competed in the 1925 24 Hours of Spa, finishing fifth overall, and the 1927 Coppa Florio, finishing 12th overall and third in class.

== Racing record ==
=== Complete 24 Hours of Le Mans results ===
Year	Team	Co-Drivers	Car	Class	Laps	Pos.	Class Pos.
1923	(France) Société Lorraine De Dietrich et Cie	(France) . Stalter	Lorraine-Dietrich B3-6 Sport [15CV]	5.0	88	19th=	2nd
1924	(France) Société Lorraine De Dietrich et Cie	(France) . Stalter	Lorraine-Dietrich B3-6 Sport	5.0	112	DNF (Engine)	
1925	(France) Société Lorraine De Dietrich et Cie	(France) Léon Saint-Paul	Lorraine-Dietrich B3-6 Sport	5.0	33	DNF (Accident)	
1926	(France) Société Lorraine De Dietrich et Cie	(France) André Rossignol	Lorraine-Dietrich B3-6 Le Mans	5.0	148	1st	1st
1928	(France) Société de Carrosserie Weymann	(France) Édouard Brisson	Stutz Model BB Blackhawk	5.0	154	2nd	2nd

Sporting positions
Preceded by André Rossignol; Gérard de Courcelles	Winner of the 24 Hours of Le Mans; 1926 with: André Rossignol	Succeeded by Dudley Benjafield; Sammy Davis
