= Gérard de Courcelles =

French racing driver

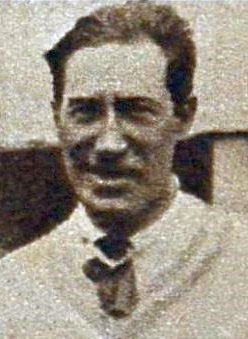
- Gérard de Courcelles in 1926
- Nationality: (France) French
- Born: Smaragd Marie Charles Henry Jullien de Courcelles; 21 May 1889; Paris (9e arrondissement)
- Died: 2 July 1927 (aged 38); Paris (15e arrondissement)

24 Hours of Le Mans career
- Years: 1923–1926
- Teams: Lorraine-Dietrich
- Best finish: 1st (1925)
- Class wins: 2 (1923, 1925)

Smaragd Marie Charles Henry Jullien "Gérard" de Courcelles (21 May 1889, Paris - 2 July 1927, Paris) was a French racing driver who won the 24 Hours of Le Mans for the French Lorraine-Dietrich automobile company, along with teammate André Rossignol.

== Career ==
De Courcelles was a decorated fighter pilot during the First World War, receiving several citations and the Médaille militaire.

De Courcelles began his career driving cyclecars in Grands Prix, but was eventually hired by Lorraine-Dietrich to enter the inaugural 24 Hours. The two drivers ran together for the next two editions of the endurance event until they succeeded in 1925. The following year the two drove separate cars, with De Courcelles assigned to Marcel Mongin. Rossignol however, and new teammate Robert Bloch, went on to win the event once again, with De Courcelles and Mongin in second.

De Courcelles died on 2 July 1927 due to an accident during a Formule Libre race supporting the Grand Prix de l'ACF.

== Racing record ==
=== Complete 24 Hours of Le Mans results ===
Year	Team	Co-Drivers	Car	Class	Laps	Pos.	Class Pos.
1923	(France) Société Lorraine De Dietrich et Cie	(France) André Rossignol	Lorraine-Dietrich B3-6 Sport [15CV]	5.0	108	8th	1st
1924	(France) Société Lorraine De Dietrich et Cie	(France) André Rossignol	Lorraine-Dietrich B3-6 Sport	5.0	119	3rd	2nd
1925	(France) Société Lorraine De Dietrich et Cie	(France) André Rossignol	Lorraine-Dietrich B3-6 Sport	5.0	129	1st	1st
1926	(France) Société Lorraine De Dietrich et Cie	(France) Marcel Mongin	Lorraine-Dietrich B3-6 Le Mans	5.0	147	2nd	2nd

Sporting positions
Preceded by John Duff; Frank Clement	Winner of the 24 Hours of Le Mans; 1925 with: André Rossignol	Succeeded by André Rossignol; Robert Bloch
