= CIME =

French engine manufacturer

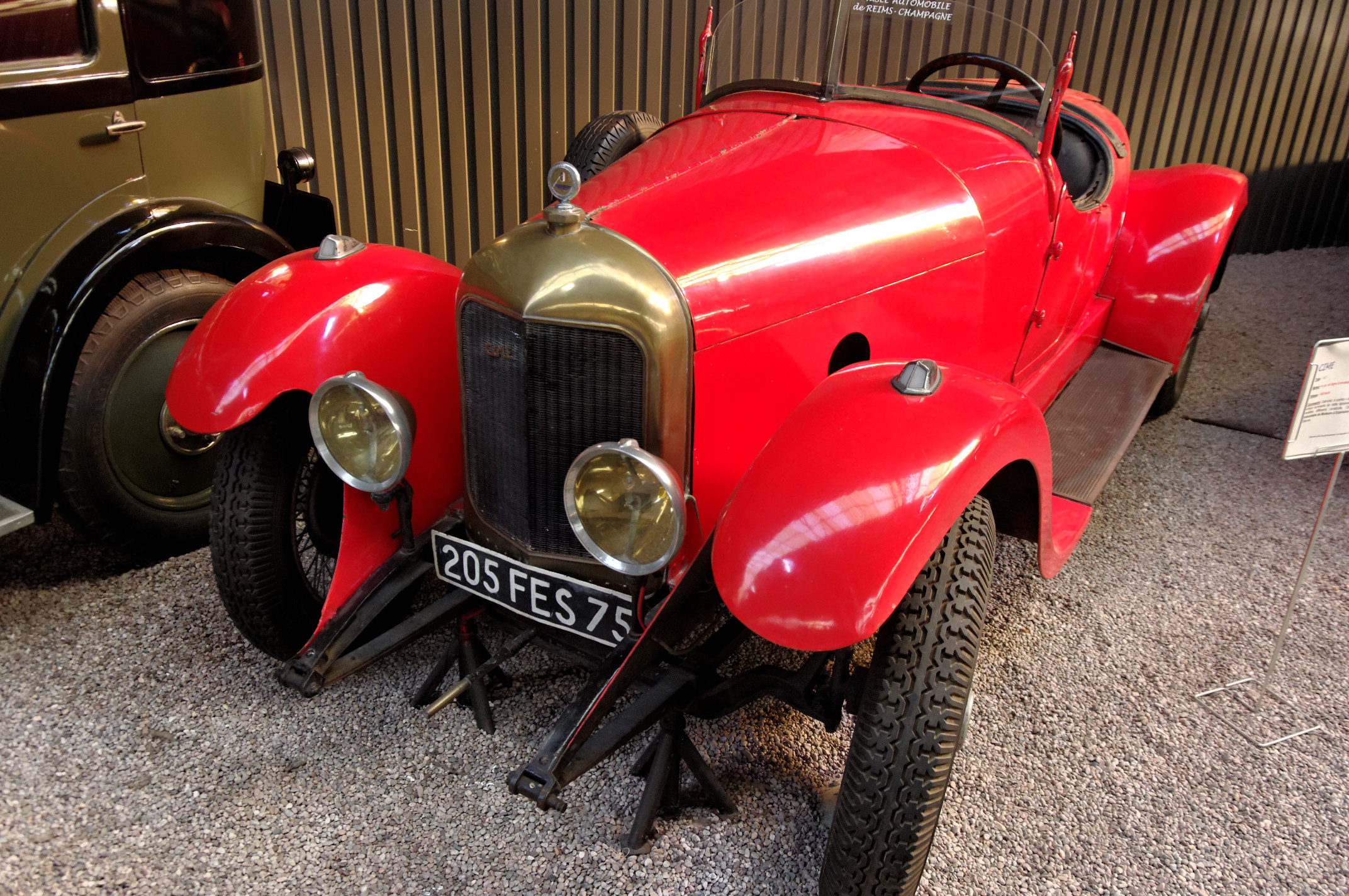
1929 CIME A2 (1,202 cc)

C.I.M.E., CIME, La Compagnie Industrielle des Moteurs a Explosion, (Industrial Combustion Engine Company), was a French manufacturer of light proprietary engines, mainly four-cylinder units. CIME also built light automobiles in 1929.

== History ==
The company was established in Fraisses in the Loire department in central France. Cime branded engines were first produced in the 1920s for third party car manufacturers. In 1929 they also began producing automobiles, but only about 20 vehicles were produced. It is not known when the company was dissolved.

== Engines ==
In 1922 an 1100 cc C.I.M.E. engine was fitted in the Anglo French Marlborough, which was mostly manufactured by Malicet et Blin in Aubervilliers, Paris. By 1924 it was priced at £175 and was produced until the company closed in 1926.

CIME engines were used by a number of cyclecar and voiturette manufacturers in the inter-war era. Their greatest successes were in E.H.P. cars, notably a fifth place at the 1927 24 Hours of Le Mans with a 1,094 cc four-cylinder.

CIME built straight-six engines, some of which were installed in the 1926 Amilcar CIME 6 cylinder Special, and the French built Derby voiturette.

== Cars ==
In 1929 they also began producing automobiles, but only about 20 vehicles were produced. The only model was the A2, a small sports car which used a 1203 cc four-cylinder engine.

A surviving specimen vehicle is displayed at the Musée Automobile Reims Champagne.
