= 1924 24 Hours of Spa =

1st 24 Hours of Spa endurance race

Seasons
- ← none 1925 →

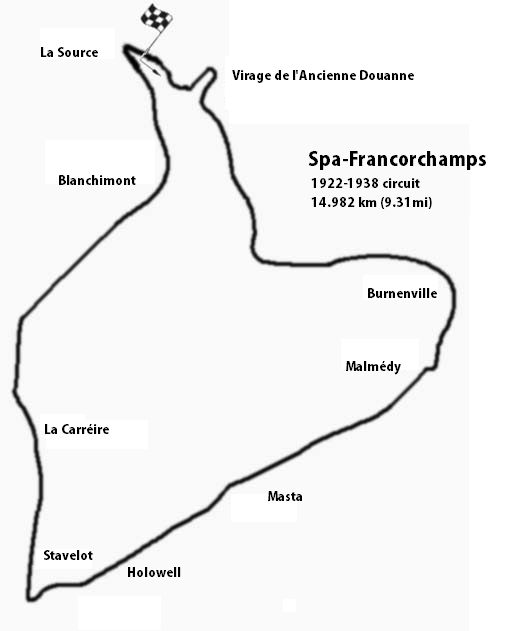
The layout of Circuit de Spa-Francorchamps (1921–1938), where the race was held

The 1924 24 Hours of Spa (also known as the Grand Prix de Belgique) was the first running of the 24 Hours of Spa. The race took place from 19 to 20 July 1924 at the Circuit de Spa-Francorchamps in Stavelot, Belgium.

Organised by the Royal Automobile Club of Belgium, the inaugural race took place on the public roads between the towns of Francorchamps, Malmedy and Stavelot. 200 acetylene lamps were erected around the 15-kilometre circuit, as the cars' own lighting systems were wholly inadequate. Rain and fog impacted the race but in the end, Maurice Becquet and Henri Springuel won, covering 1,879.992 kilometres (1,168.173 miles) with an average speed of 78.33 km/h (48.67 mph).

== Race result ==
Class winners denoted in bold

Pos.	Class	No.	Team	Drivers	Car	Distance (Km)
1	**2.0**	**20**	**(France) Bignan**	(France) **Maurice Becquet** **(France) Henri Springuel**	**Bignan 2L**	**1879.992**
2	2.0	13	(France) Chenard & Walcker	(France) André Lagache (Belgium) André Pisart	Chenard & Walcker 10/12CV	1866.000
3	2.0	16		(Belgium) Barthélémy Bruyère (Belgium) Baron Raymond de Tornaco	Bignan 2L	1761.000
4	2.0	19	(France) Georges Irat	(France) Émile Burie (France) Amedée Rossi	Georges Irat	1752.000
5	**1.5**	**32**	**(France) Corre La Licorne**	**(France) Louis Balart** **(France) Albert Colomb**	**Corre La Licorne**	**1630.000**
6	**3.0**	**1**	**(Belgium) Baertsoen & Bonar**	**(Belgium) Jean Baertsoen** **(Belgium) Géo Bonar**	**Speedsport Type PE**	**1612.000**
7	1.5	30	(France) Chenard & Walcker	(Belgium) Joseph Chavée (France) Raymond Glaszmann	Chenard & Walcker	1610.000
8	2.0	15		(France) Jean Lasalle (France) Malleveau	Georges Irat	1608.000
9	2.0	12		(Belgium) Humble (Belgium) Lansival	De Dion-Bouton	1584.000
10	1.5	34	(France) Corre La Licorne	(France) Robert Lestienne (France) Fernand Vallon	Corre La Licorne	1570.000
11	2.0	17		(Belgium) de Clerq (Belgium) Colmat	Miesse	1492.000
12	**1.1**	**40**		**(France) Charles Libovitch** **(Belgium) Joseph Reinartz**	**Amilcar**	**1486.000**
13	1.5	31		(Belgium) Breurs (Belgium) Lebouc	Citroën 10 HP	1365.000
14	1.5	33		(Belgium) Bombaerts (Belgium) Devergnies	Citroën 10 HP	1365.000
15	1.5	35		(Belgium) Gaucher (Belgium) Gheldoff	Citroën 10 HP	1365.000
16	1.1	41		(United Kingdom) Rietveld (United Kingdom) Thys	Salmson	1365.000
17	1.1	42		(Belgium) Roger Rouleau	Amilcar	1174.000
Ret	3.0	2		(Belgium) J. de Clerq (Belgium) van Parijs	Chevrolet F Super	Did not finish
Ret	3.0	3		(Belgium) Jacques Boyriven (Soviet Union) Jean Haimovici	Alfa Romeo RLS	Did not finish
Ret	2.0	10		(France) Frédéric Théllusson	Chenard & Walcker	Did not finish
Ret	3.0	5		(Belgium) Marcel Rouleau	Alfa Romeo RLS	Did not finish
Ret	2.0	11	(Belgium) Miesse	(Belgium) Edmond Miesse (Belgium) Pouleur	Miesse	Did not finish
Ret	2.0	18	(France) Ballot	(Belgium) Pierre Decrose (Belgium) Montjoux	Ballot	Did not finish
Ret	2.0	14	(France) Ballot	(Belgium) Freddy Charlier (Belgium) René de Buck	Ballot	Mechanical
Ret	3.0	6	(France) Bignan	(Belgium) Jacques Edouard Ledure (Soviet Union) Boris Ivanowski	Bignan 3L	Did not finish
Ret	3.0	4	(France) Bignan	(France) Jean Martin (Belgium) Henri-Julien Matthys	Bignan 3L	Accident

== Statistics ==
- Pole Position - #1 Baertsoen & Bonar
- Fastest Lap - #14 Ballot

== Bibliography ==
- Blumlein, David (December 2014). The Spa 24 Hours, A History. Transport Bookman Publications. ISBN 9780851840772.
