= 2014 Belgian Grand Prix =

Formula One motor race held in 2014

Race 12 of 19 in the 2014 Formula One World Championship
← Previous race	Next race →
- Layout of the Spa-Francorchamps circuit

Race details
- Date: 24 August 2014
- Official name: 2014 Formula 1 Shell Belgian Grand Prix
- Location: Circuit de Spa-Francorchamps, Francorchamps, Wallonia, Belgium
- Course: Permanent racing facility
- Course length: 7.004 km (4.352 miles)
- Distance: 44 laps, 308.052 km (191.415 (Note: There is a 0.124 km (0.077 mi) offset between the start and finish lines.) miles)
- Weather: Mostly cloudy
- Attendance: 80,000

Pole position
Driver	(Germany) Nico Rosberg	Mercedes
- Time: 2:05.591

Fastest lap
Driver	(Germany) Nico Rosberg	Mercedes
- Time: 1:50.511 on lap 36

Podium
First	(Australia) Daniel Ricciardo	Red Bull Racing-Renault
Second	(Germany) Nico Rosberg	Mercedes
Third	(Finland) Valtteri Bottas	Williams-Mercedes

The 2014 Belgian Grand Prix (officially the 2014 Formula 1 Shell Belgian Grand Prix) was a Formula One motor race held at the Circuit de Spa-Francorchamps, in Francorchamps, Wallonia, Belgium, on 24 August. It was the 12th round of the 2014 Formula One World Championship and the 58th Belgian Grand Prix held as part of the series. Red Bull driver Daniel Ricciardo won the 44-lap race starting from fifth position. Nico Rosberg finished second for Mercedes and Williams' Valtteri Bottas was third.

Entering the race, Rosberg led the World Drivers' Championship and Mercedes led the World Constructors' Championship. Although Rosberg qualified on pole position by posting the fastest lap time in the third qualifying session, he was immediately passed by his teammate Lewis Hamilton and the second Red Bull of Sebastian Vettel at the start. He returned to second after Vettel made a driver error at Les Combes corner and took the lead following contact with the right-hand front wing end plate and Hamilton's left-rear tyre on lap two. Rosberg made a pit stop to replace the front wing at the conclusion of lap eight, relinquishing the lead to Ricciardo. Over the course of the remainder of the race, Ricciardo maintained the lead and responded to the faster Rosberg in the final ten laps to achieve his second victory in a row and the third of his career. Following Ricciardo's win, Red Bull was able to celebrate its 50th Grand Prix victory, becoming the fifth team to achieve this feat.

Rosberg was booed by the crowd and received an undisclosed punishment from Mercedes for hitting Hamilton; the two were allowed to race each other with no team orders used. The result kept Ricciardo third in the World Drivers' Championship as Rosberg increased his lead over Hamilton to 29 championship points after Hamilton retired with bodywork damage. Ferrari's Fernando Alonso maintained fourth from Bottas in fifth. Mercedes retained its lead over Red Bull in the World Constructors' Championship with seven races left in the season.

== Background ==
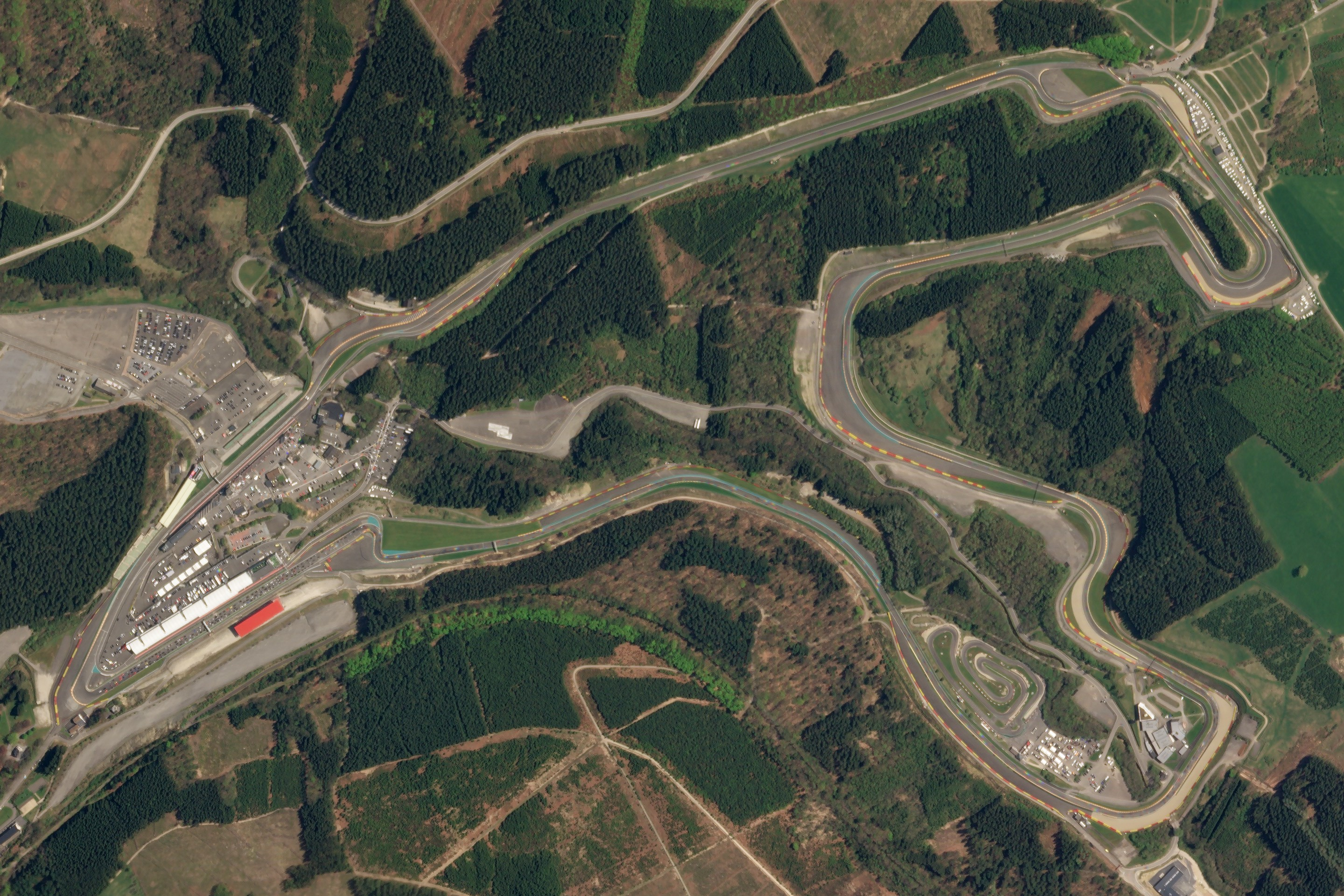
The Circuit de Spa-Francorchamps (pictured in 2018), where the race was held

The race was the 12th of the 19 rounds in the 2014 Formula One World Championship and the 58th Belgian Grand Prix Formula One race. It was held at the 20-turn 7.004 km (4.352 mi) Circuit de Spa-Francorchamps in Francorchamps, Wallonia, Belgium, on 24 August. Tyre supplier Pirelli brought four types of tyre to the race: two dry compounds (yellow-banded soft and the white-banded medium) and two wet-weather compounds (intermediate and full wet). The drag reduction system (DRS) had two activation zones for the race, one was on the straight linking the Bus Stop chicane and La Source corner, and the second was on the Kemmel Straight linking Radillion and Les Combes turns. Following the 2013 race, new debris fences were erected at La Source turn, the barrier on the inside of turn 11 was renewed and track drainage was improved.

Entering the race, Mercedes driver Nico Rosberg led the World Drivers' Championship with 202 championship points, 11 ahead of his teammate Lewis Hamilton in second. Daniel Ricciardo of Red Bull was third with 131 championship points after winning the preceding Hungarian Grand Prix four weeks earlier and Ferrari's Fernando Alonso was fourth with 115 championship points. Valtteri Bottas for the Williams team was fifth with 95 championship points. Mercedes led the World Constructors' Championship with 393 championship points and they were ahead of Red Bull in second with 213 championship points. Ferrari were with 142 championship points and Williams were seven championship points behind in fourth. With 98 championship points, Force India held fifth place.

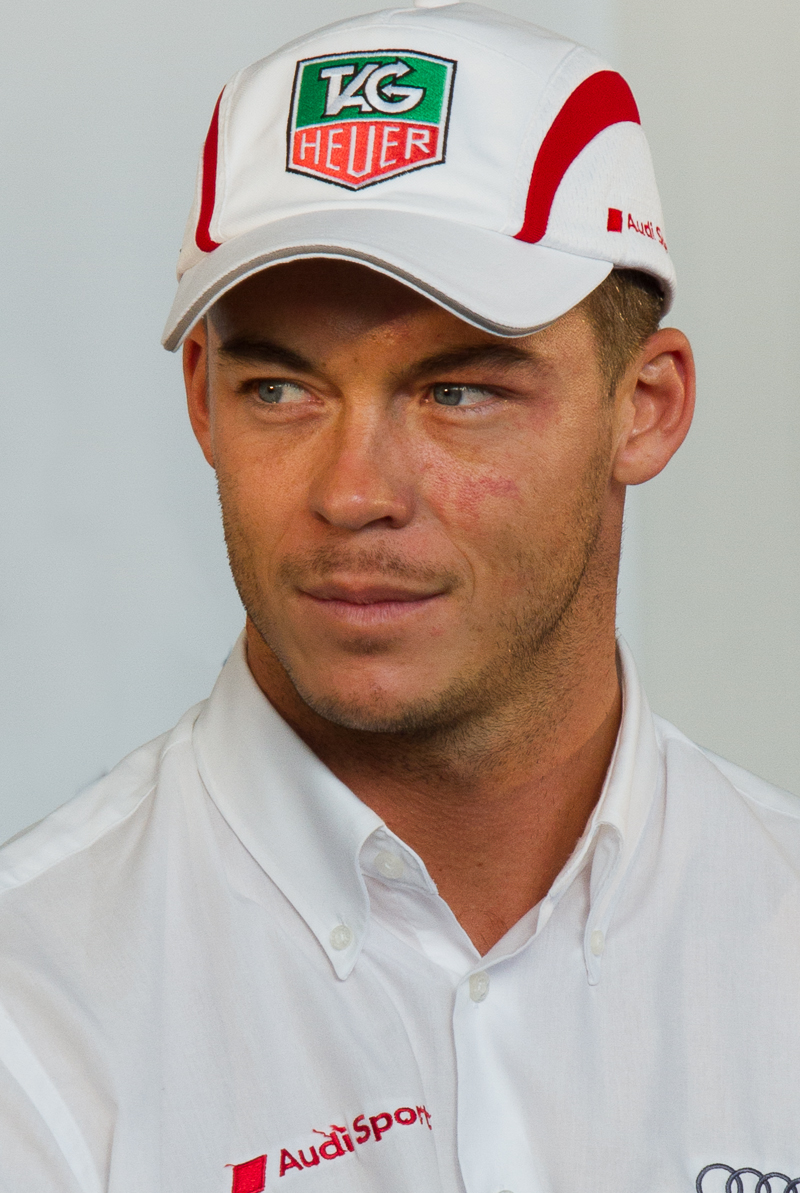
André Lotterer (pictured in 2012) made his début at a Formula One race weekend, replacing Kamui Kobayashi at Caterham.

At the preceding Hungarian Grand Prix, Hamilton ignored team orders from Mercedes to allow Rosberg to pass him in the final laps. He reduced the World Drivers' Championship deficit to 11 championship points with a third-place finish as Rosberg took fourth. The two discussed how the situation should be diffused in a meeting on the night of 21 August, three days before the Belgian Grand Prix. For his part, Hamilton said he desired a recreation of his best form from earlier in the season and sought to put his recent below-par qualifying performances behind him,

"I had some difficult weekends in the first part of the season, but then a bit of good fortune at the last race in Budapest kept me from damaging my car on the wall during that first lap, so hopefully that was a sign that my fortunes are changing at just the right time.There were so many positives to take from the opening eleven races, but both myself and the team always want more and know we are capable of more. The aim is to put the more difficult times of some of the previous weekends behind us and to recreate the best moments at every race from now on. I love driving at Spa, so there are few better places to start."

Rosberg said he would not underestimate the duel for the championship due to pace of the other teams, "In Formula One you just can't afford to give away any advantage and I know that both the team and myself will be working harder than ever to keep improving and maintain our position right to the very end. On top of that, the battle with Lewis has been so close all season – and it could well stay that way right up to the final race – so every last point will be crucial in that contest, too."

There were 11 teams (each representing a different constructor) each entering two race drivers for the event with a solitary driver change. On the recommendation of Caterham team owner Colin Kolles, three-time winner of the 24 Hours of Le Mans and 2011 Formula Nippon champion André Lotterer drove in lieu of Kamui Kobayashi at Caterham. At 32 years, 288 days old, Lotterer was the oldest driver to debut in Formula One since Giovanni Lavaggi at the 1995 German Grand Prix and it was his first time in a Formula One car since testing for Jaguar in 2002. Marussia announced that GP2 Series competitor and test and reserve driver Alexander Rossi would be entered in place of regular driver Max Chilton, because of reported "contractual issues" but the organisation who represented Chilton said that he relinquished his role "voluntarily". Chilton's seat was subsequently reinstated following a successful request to the stewards by Marussia, meaning Rossi drove only in the first practice session. In that session, Sauber reserve driver Giedo van der Garde drove Esteban Gutiérrez's car.

== Practice ==
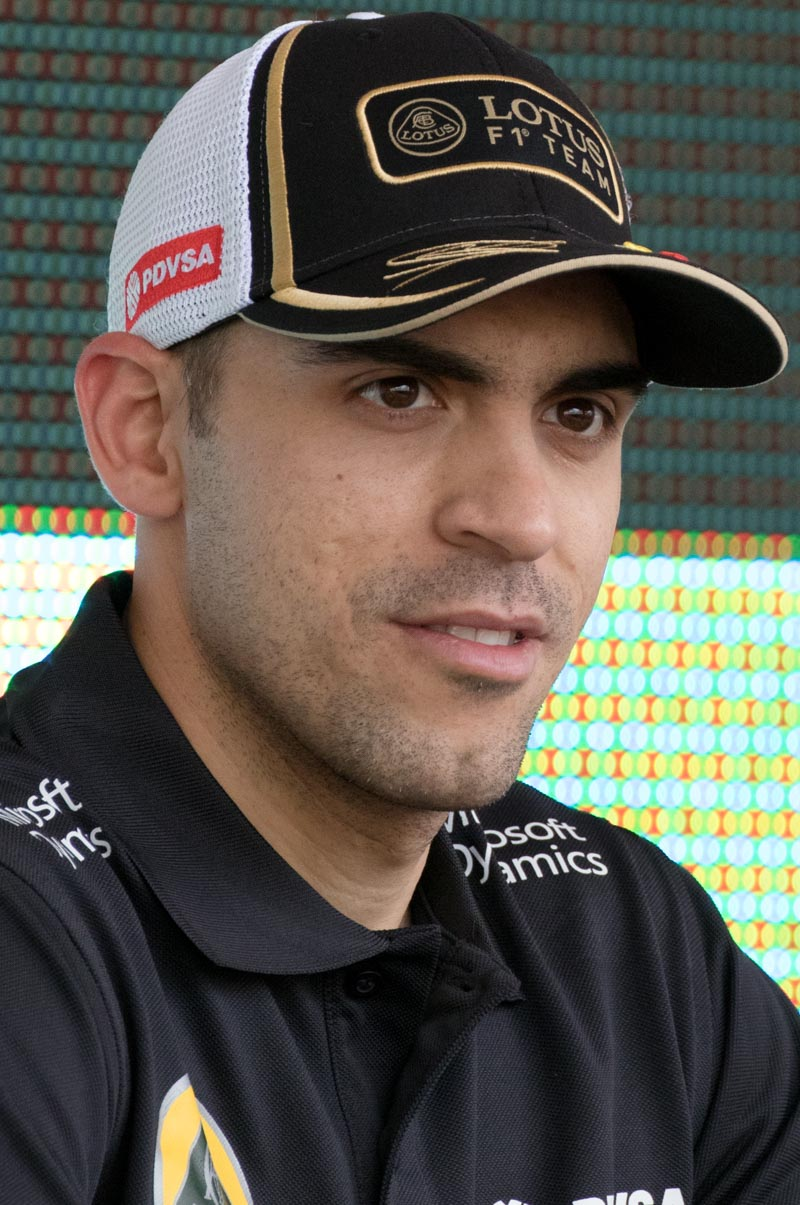
Pastor Maldonado (pictured in 2015) crashed in the second practice session and stopped the session temporarily.

Per the regulations for the 2014 season, three practice sessions were held, two 90-minute sessions on Friday and one 60-minute session on Saturday. In the first session, held in dry weather, Rosberg was fastest with a lap of 1:51.577, almost a tenth of a second quicker than his teammate Hamilton in second. Ferrari's Alonso and Kimi Räikkönen were third and fifth, separated by Jenson Button's McLaren in fourth. Force India's Sergio Pérez led McLaren's Kevin Magnussen, the other Force India of Nico Hülkenberg, Ricciardo and Bottas in positions six to ten. During the session, Alonso briefly stopped at the edge of Eau Rouge corner with engine problems, and his teammate Räikkönen spun leaving the La Source hairpin before his car's energy recovery system overheated. Button's DRS was lodged open, Vettel's session ended early with a temperature-related exhaust failure and Marcus Ericsson spun his Caterham at the La Source hairpin.

Hamilton set the day's fastest lap on the soft compound tyre during a qualifying simulation in the second session at 1:49.189. Rosberg was 0.604 seconds slower in second and Alonso was third. Felipe Massa of Williams was fourth, Button fifth and Bottas sixth. Toro Rosso's Daniil Kvyat, Ricciardo, Magnussen and Hülkenberg followed in the top ten. Just after eight minutes into practice, Pastor Maldonado ran onto the grass on the outside exiting Rivage corner and heading into Pouhon turn. He lost control of his Lotus, speared across into a barrier on the inside, causing a red flag. The right-rear wheel was deranged from Maldonado's car and track marshals cleared debris. He was transported to the circuit's medical centre for a pre-cautionary check-up and was later released with no injuries found. A gearbox fault caused Gutiérrez to spin soon after at Blanchimont corner, prompting a second stoppage since he was unable to continue driving.

After the second session, Vettel, whose ignition failed in one cylinder breaking the exhaust and overheating the kinetic motor–generator unit, changed his engine, his fifth of the season. He avoided incurring a ten-place grid penalty because he reverted to an old engine used in the preceding Hungarian Grand Prix. Heavy overnight rain made the circuit damp and little on-track activity occurred in the final session's first half an hour. Wet and intermediate tyres were used before the dry soft and medium tyres for the rest of the session as teams prepared for qualifying. Bottas was fastest on the drying track with a lap of 1:49.465 late in the session. Ricciardo, Rosberg, Räikkönen, Hamilton, Alonso, Kvyat, Button, Massa and Toro Rosso's Jean-Éric Vergne completed the top ten.

== Qualifying ==
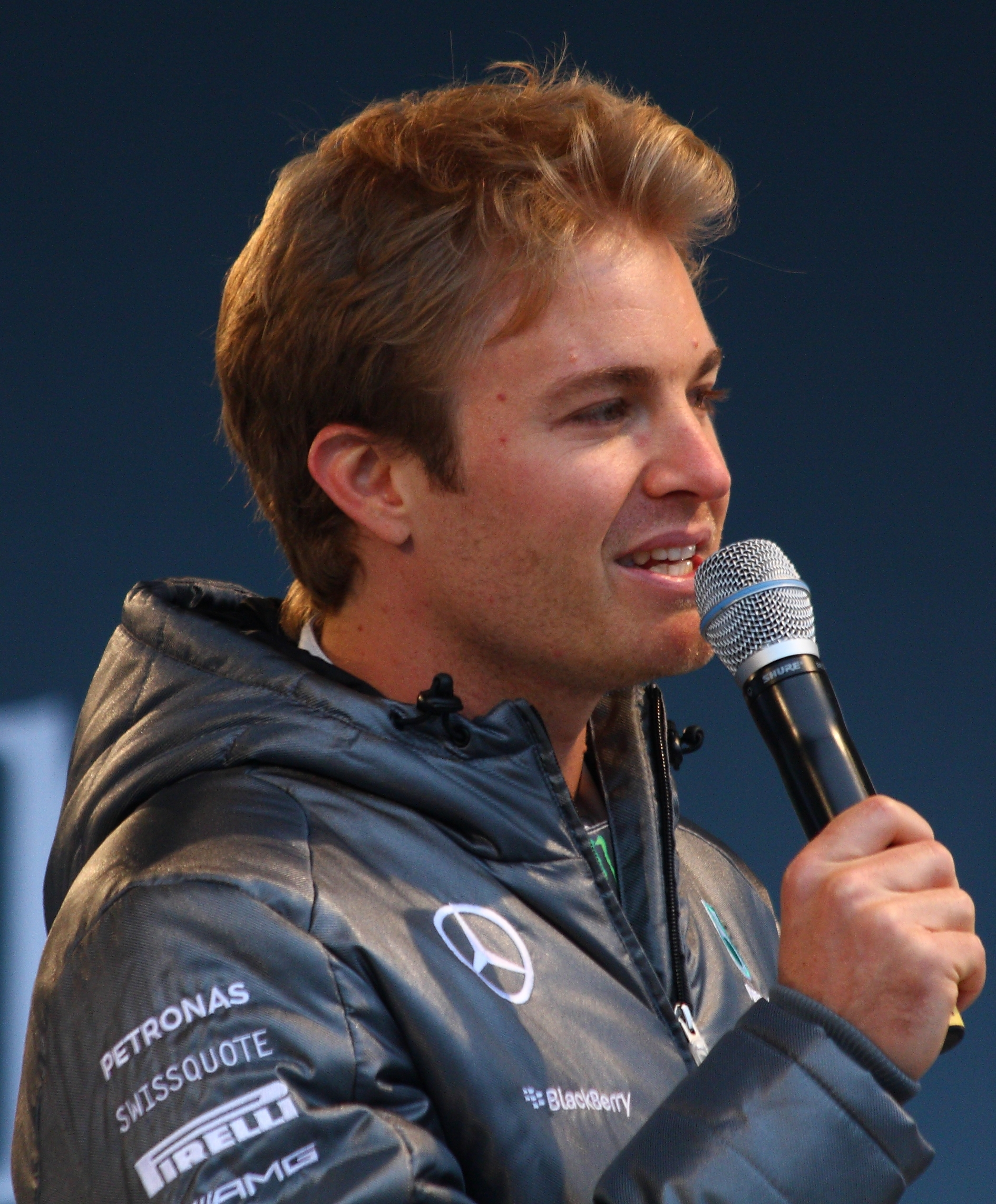
Nico Rosberg achieved the 11th pole position of his career in a rain-affected qualifying session.

Saturday afternoon's qualifying session was divided into three parts. The first part ran for 18 minutes, eliminating cars that finished the session 17th or below. The 107% rule was in effect, requiring drivers to reach a time within 107 per cent of the quickest lap to qualify. The second part lasted 15 minutes, eliminating cars that finished 11th to 16th. The final 12-minute session determined pole position to tenth. Cars who progressed to the final session were not allowed to change tyres for the race's start, using the tyres with which they set their quickest lap times in the second session. Heavy rain returned 40 minutes before qualifying commenced and accompanied a hailstorm, making the circuit slippery. Although it later stopped, uncertainty over the weather caused teams to use wet-weather tyres. Rain returned at the conclusion of the first session and it remained for most of the following session before turning sunny for the final session.

Rosberg was fastest in the first and third sessions and took his fourth pole position in succession, his seventh of 2014, and the 11th of his career with a time of 2:05.591. He was joined on the grid's front row by his teammate Hamilton whose front left brake disc was grazed, causing his car to jerk; Hamilton lost time by changing his braking points. Vettel and Alonso took third and fourth after their first timed laps of the final session and both drivers could not better the two Mercedes. Ricciardo qualified fifth after running wide at Blanchimont corner on his final lap. A loss of time in the first third of the lap caused Bottas to start from sixth. An understeer from flat-spotting his front tyres at the La Source hairpin in the second session put Magnussen seventh. Multiple driving errors from Räikkönen left him eighth. Ninth-placed Massa had a grazed front right disc in the track's heavy braking zones. Traffic on his warm-up lap comprised his tyre warming and slowed him. Button took tenth after locking his brakes cresting a hill into Les Combes corner.

Kvyat was the fastest driver not to qualify in the top ten because he was demoted to 11th in the final seconds of the second session. An exhaust system fault limited his teammate Vergne to three timed laps and 12th place. The wet track prevented Pérez in 13th from going faster. Sauber's Adrian Sutil pushed hard to start from 14th and a loss of rear car control left Lotus' Romain Grosjean in 15th. Marussia driver Jules Bianchi entered the second session for the second successive year in Belgium and the third time in the last four races; he took 16th after balance issues at Les Combes corner and brake grazing problems caused him to run deep at Bruxelles turn. Maldonado, 17th. failed to progress beyond the first session after spinning on his fastest lap. Hülkenberg in 18th could not progress past the first session for the first time since the 2012 season due to a loss of brake feel and a minor driver error. A lack of battery power put Chilton 19th and powertrain problems left Gutiérrez in 20th. Lotterer in 21st out-qualified his Caterham teammate Ericsson in 22nd by almost a second.

=== Qualifying classification ===
The fastest lap in each of the three sessions is denoted in bold.

Pos.	No.	Driver	Constructor	Q1	Q2	Q3	Grid
1	6	(Germany) Nico Rosberg	Mercedes	**2:07.130**	2:06.723	**2:05.591**	1
2	44	(United Kingdom) Lewis Hamilton	Mercedes	2:07.280	**2:06.609**	2:05.819	2
3	1	(Germany) Sebastian Vettel	Red Bull Racing-Renault	2:10.105	2:08.868	2:07.717	3
4	14	(Spain) Fernando Alonso	Ferrari	2:10.197	2:08.450	2:07.786	4
5	3	(Australia) Daniel Ricciardo	Red Bull Racing-Renault	2:10.089	2:08.989	2:07.911	5
6	77	(Finland) Valtteri Bottas	Williams-Mercedes	2:09.250	2:08.451	2:08.049	6
7	20	(Denmark) Kevin Magnussen	McLaren-Mercedes	2:11.081	2:08.901	2:08.679	7
8	7	(Finland) Kimi Räikkönen	Ferrari	2:09.885	2:08.646	2:08.780	8
9	19	(Brazil) Felipe Massa	Williams-Mercedes	2:08.403	2:08.833	2:09.178	9
10	22	(United Kingdom) Jenson Button	McLaren-Mercedes	2:10.529	2:09.272	2:09.776	10
11	26	(Russia) Daniil Kvyat	Toro Rosso-Renault	2:10.445	2:09.377	N/A	11
12	25	(France) Jean-Éric Vergne	Toro Rosso-Renault	2:09.811	2:09.805	N/A	12
13	11	(Mexico) Sergio Pérez	Force India-Mercedes	2:10.666	2:10.084	N/A	13
14	99	(Germany) Adrian Sutil	Sauber-Ferrari	2:11.051	2:10.238	N/A	14
15	8	(France) Romain Grosjean	Lotus-Renault	2:10.898	2:11.087	N/A	15
16	17	(France) Jules Bianchi	Marussia-Ferrari	2:11.051	2:12.470	N/A	16
17	13	(Venezuela) Pastor Maldonado	Lotus-Renault	2:11.261	N/A	N/A	17
18	27	(Germany) Nico Hülkenberg	Force India-Mercedes	2:11.267	N/A	N/A	18
19	4	(United Kingdom) Max Chilton	Marussia-Ferrari	2:12.566	N/A	N/A	19
20	21	(Mexico) Esteban Gutiérrez	Sauber-Ferrari	2:13.414	N/A	N/A	20
21	45	(Germany) André Lotterer	Caterham-Renault	2:13.469	N/A	N/A	21
22	9	(Sweden) Marcus Ericsson	Caterham-Renault	2:14.438	N/A	N/A	22
107% time: 2:16.029

== Race ==
The race began from a standing start at 14:00 Central European Summer Time (UTC+02:00). The weather at the start was dry with dark clouds, and some rain had fallen. The air temperature was between 13 and 15 °C (55 and 59 °F) and the track temperature from 21 and 31 °C (70 and 88 °F); forecasts on Sunday predicted rain to fall but not with the same intensity as on Saturday. Every driver, except for Sutil, began on the soft compound tyres. The soft compound tyre was predicted to be 13 seconds faster over 15 laps and degradation rate research prompted most teams to make two pit stops for their drivers. As the Ferrari mechanics were about to start Alonso's car on the grid, it failed to respond because its battery had been emptied for unspecified reasons. They retrieved a jump-start battery from their garage and used it on his car, giving Alonso a five-second time penalty taken at his first pit stop since Ferrari broke a regulation mandating all team personnel to vacate the track 15 seconds before the start of the formation lap. Alonso's mechanics completed the installation of the spare battery before the last car passed him, allowing him to start from fourth.

Although he stopped slightly outside of his grid slot and reversed to find a good angle, Hamilton used his teammate Rosberg's slower start to lead into the La Source hairpin. Vettel braked later than Rosberg on the inside and passed him going uphill towards Eau Rouge corner putting himself between the two Mercedes. He deployed 160 hp (120 kW) of electrical energy on the Kemmel Straight as Hamilton attempted to prevent Vettel from clinging onto his slipstream by defending on the right, encouraging Vettel to steer left and he out-braked Hamilton on cold tyres. He locked his tyres and used the run-off area to rejoin the track in third, behind Rosberg but ahead of Ricciardo. Elsewhere, Bianchi and Grosjean made contact at the exit to the La Source hairpin, puncturing Bianchi's right-rear tyre and forcing him into the pit lane for a replacement wheel. At the end of the first lap, Hamilton led his teammate Rosberg by half a second, with Vettel third. Alonso and Ricciardo were fourth and fifth. Maldonado became the first driver to retire from the race with a suspected exhaust failure causing smoke to emit from the rear of his car on lap two.

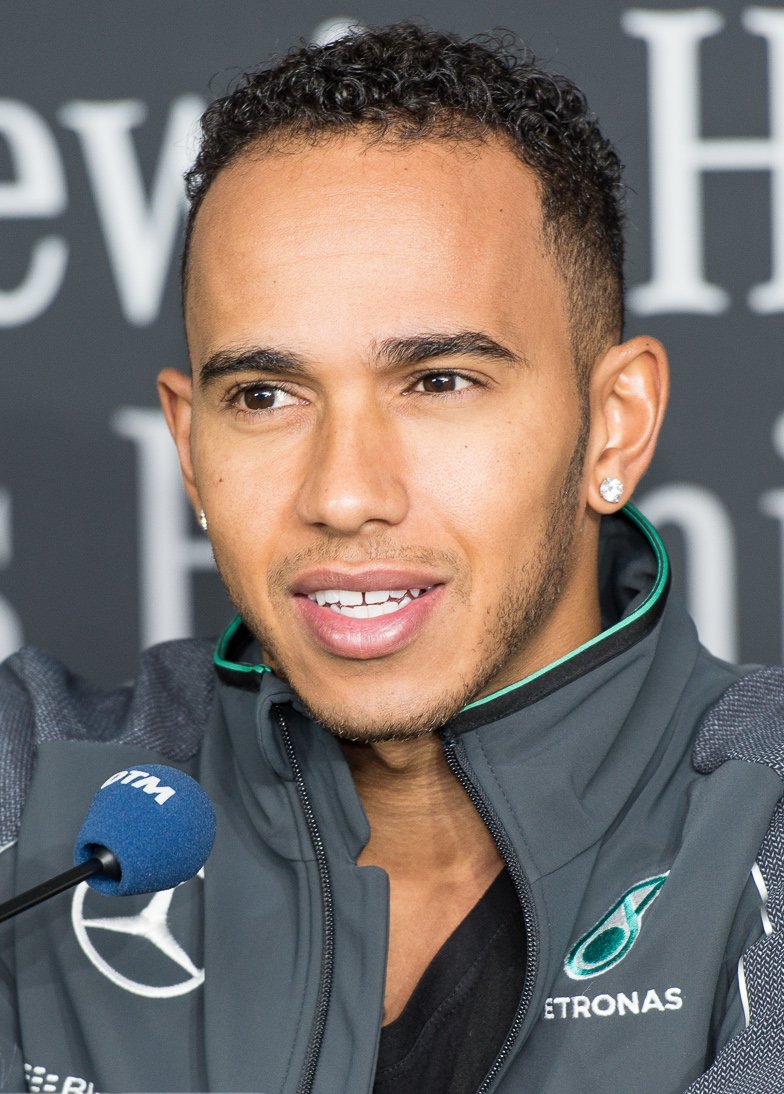
Lewis Hamilton was put out of contention from contact with his teammate Rosberg on lap two. He subsequently implored his team Mercedes to retire him and was allowed to on the 39th lap.

That lap, Hamilton again went defensive but this time from Rosberg, his teammate, who slipstreamed him. Rosberg put Hamilton on the outside line as his front wing was level with Hamilton's side pod when the two entered Les Combes corner. As Hamilton was halfway through the left-hand turn, his left-rear tyre got punctured by Rosberg's front right wing endplate. A section of endplate was launched airborne; much of Rosberg's front wing remained intact. Hamilton's tyre delaminated at the exit to Pouhon corner and it caused downforce-related bodywork damage. He drove slowly to the pit lane and rejoined the race in 19th. DRS was enabled on the third lap. On that lap, Ricciardo's low-downforce setup gave him an efficient DRS to pass Alonso for third into Les Combes corner. Ricciardo quickly drew close to his teammate Vettel. After Vettel ran wide onto the damp artificial grass through Pouhon corner on lap five, he slid luridly and Ricciardo got past for second. On the same lap, Lotterer was retired from a loss of power, possibly caused by him driving over an exit kerb too hard at Blanchimont turn and causing a fuse to be dislodged. Pérez passed Massa for ninth on lap six and Bottas used DRS to overtake Alonso for fourth on the Kemmel Straight.

Rosberg was called into the pit lane at the end of lap eight for a replacement front wing and the medium compound tyres. He rejoined the race in 15th. Räikkönen made a pit stop on the same lap in Ferrari's attempt to put him ahead of Bottas and Vettel after the pit stops ended. On lap 10, a section of tyre carcass from Bianchi's punctured tyre wrapped itself around Rosberg's radio antenna, diverting his attention before releasing itself. Between laps 10 and 12, Vettel, Ricciardo, Bottas and Alonso made their first pit stops. After the pit stops, Ricciardo led Räikkönen by 2.4 seconds, with Vettel a further three seconds behind in third, Rosberg was fourth and Bottas fifth. Magnussen overtook Vergne for seventh at the Bus Stop chicane on the 15th lap. Back in fourth, Rosberg's pit stop on the eighth lap compromised him strategy-wise and he could not pass Vettel on the straights. He attempted to brake later than Vettel on the outside at the Bus Stop chicane on lap 17; he locked his tyres on the run-off area. Bottas slipstreamed Rosberg on the Kemmel Straight and deployed DRS to move into fourth. Two laps later, Rosberg made a second pit stop to replace his flat-spotted tyres with the soft compounds and emerged in 11th.

Räikkönen was almost eight seconds behind Ricciardo when Ferrari asked him to enter the pit lane on the 20th lap because his rear tyres had degraded enough to prompt a tyre change. On lap 21, Hamilton in 17th implored Mercedes to retire him because of his car's bodywork damage; the team insisted he continue in anticipation of a safety car deployment. Rosberg passed Pérez for seventh on lap 22. That lap, Vettel who lapped in the 1:55 range to Rosberg's 1:51 laps made his pit stop and fell in eighth, behind Rosberg and Räikkönen. During lap 23, Magnussen in fourth blocked Alonso from overtaking him three times. That lap, Rosberg passed Button for fourth, only for Button to reclaim the position because Rosberg had a fuel limit issue. On the following lap, Rosberg tried again to pass Button and he was successful that time round. He overtook Alonso on the Kemmel Straight for third on lap 25. That lap, Hamilton overtook Grosjean for 16th and Button lost fifth to Vettel at the Bus Stop chicane.

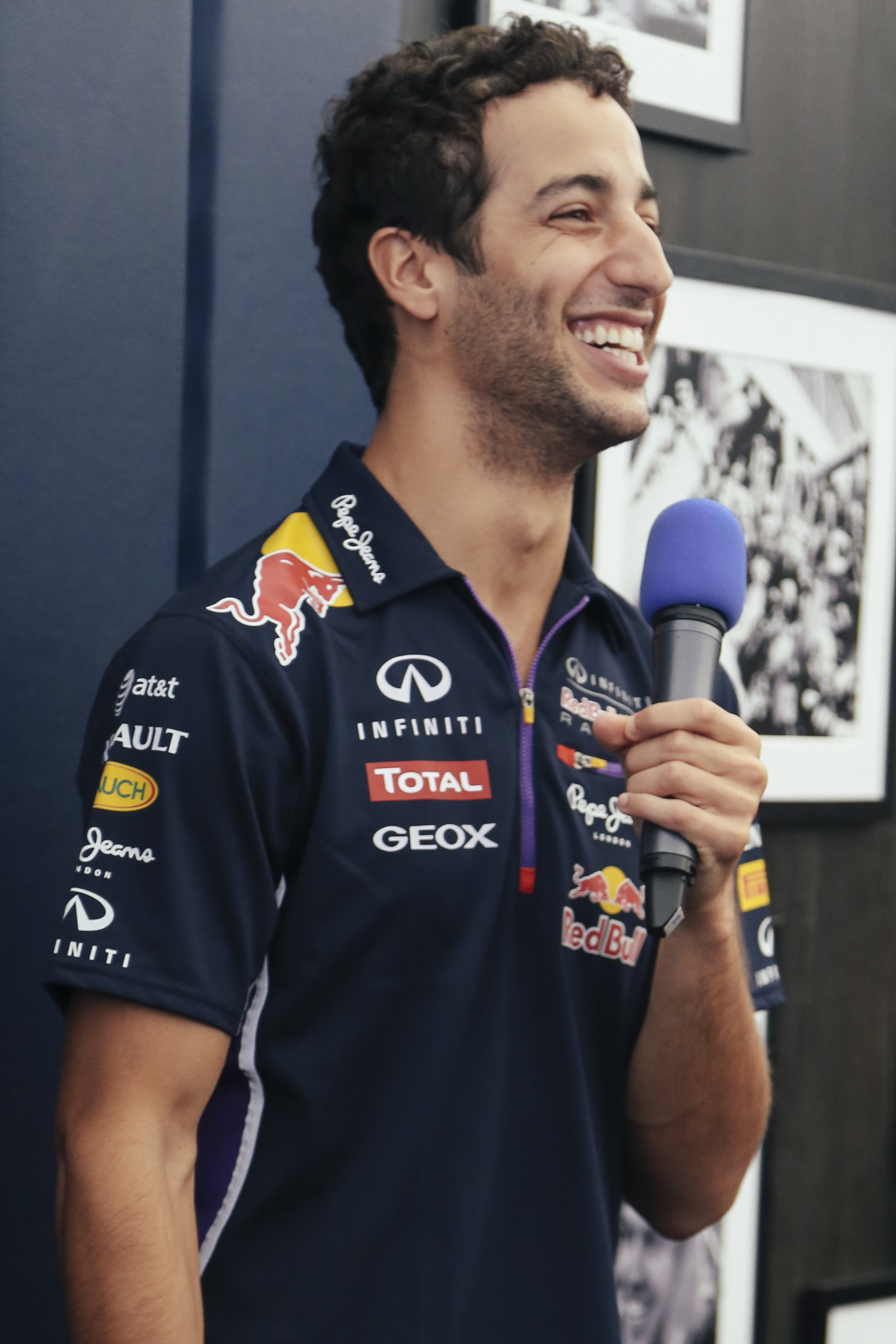
Daniel Ricciardo (pictured at the Italian Grand Prix) took his second consecutive victory and claimed the third win of his career.

Ricciardo made a second pit stop from the lead for the medium compound tyres at the conclusion of the 27th lap. He exited the pit lane 3.7 seconds ahead of Rosberg in third. Bottas took the lead for one lap, before making his own stop at the end of the lap 28 and emerged in fifth. Bottas overtook Vettel on the outside at Les Combes corner for fourth on lap 30. Four laps later, Grosjean retired from downforce-related damage sustained to his Lotus at his second pit stop. After Ricciardo re-assumed the lead earlier, Rosberg's soft compound tyres were worn and could not match Ricciardo's pace. Mercedes decided to put Rosberg on a third pit stop to get the win from Ricciardo on the final lap. Red Bull gave Ricciardo a target lap time of 1:53.400 to stop Rosberg overtaking him, which he did consistently. Rosberg's pit stop came at the end of lap 34. He passed Bottas and Räikkönen to return to second by lap 36.

Hamilton's request to retire was granted on the 39th lap. He entered the pit lane and was pushed into the garage. Around that period, Bottas challenged his compatriot Räikkönen for third on the outside of Les Combes corner but Räikkönen prevented Bottas from completing the pass. Bottas attempted again on lap 40 and passed Räikkönen on the Kemmel Straight. One lap later, Bianchi retired with a failed gearbox. As Alonso slipstreamed Magnussen at 320 km/h (200 mph) on the Kemmel Straight and lapped Ericsson on lap 42, Magnussen turned right and Alonso put half of his Ferrari onto the grass to avoid a major crash. Alonso's loss of momentum allowed Button past him into Les Combes corner. Button failed to pass his teammate Magnussen at Rivage turn, allowing Alonso and Vettel to demote him to seventh. Alonso tried again to pass Magnussen on lap 43 at Les Combes corner though it encouraged Vettel to draw alongside him. He tried for a third time at Rivage corner but was put onto the grass and Vettel overtook Alonso.

Starting the final lap, Vettel overtook Magnussen into the La Source hairpin and Alonso attempted to pass Vettel on the inside. Alonso hit the rear of Vettel's car, breaking his front wing, and Button passed Alonso for seventh. Meanwhile, Ricciardo maintained the lead under pressure from Rosberg for his second successive win, and the third of his career. Rosberg in second followed 3.383 seconds later and Bottas took third. Off the podium, Räikkönen took his best result since the 2013 Korean Grand Prix, finishing fourth. Magnussen finished fifth on the road and Vettel sixth. Button, Alonso, Pérez and Kvyat were in seventh to tenth. Outside the top ten, Hülkenberg, Vergne, Massa, Sutil, Gutiérrez, Chilton, Ericsson and Bianchi were the final finishers.

=== Post-race ===
At the podium interviews, conducted by former team owner Eddie Jordan, Rosberg was booed by the crowd four times for his contact with Hamilton on lap two, which they perceived as intentional. He blamed the reaction on a small group of Hamilton's British support and urged them to acquaint themselves with the regulations and a drivers' code of conduct before booing. Ricciardo said he had to maintain his pace and not hit anything after Rosberg entered the pit lane. Rosberg spoke of his confidence Mercedes could have dominated because of their quick pace and Bottas said it would be difficult for Williams to win because of Mercedes' outright speed. In the later press conference, Ricciardo said he had foreseen himself accruing enough points to put himself in contention for the Drivers' Championship. Rosberg said his strategy was altered because of the damage to his car and declined to reveal details of the meeting with Mercedes after the Hungarian Grand Prix concerning envisaging contact with Hamilton. Bottas stated a slow start caused other cars to delay him and called the duel with compatriot Räikkönen "a clean and fair fight".

The collision between Rosberg and Hamilton on lap two overshadowed the race. The stewards investigated the contact and declared it "a racing incident", with neither driver to blame. Hamilton claimed after a meeting that Rosberg admitted to have made wilful contact to "prove a point" and that Hamilton could have avoided the situation. Rosberg initially denied any wrongdoing, saying he discerned no risk in attempting the manoeuvre. Mercedes team principal Toto Wolff called the contact "absolutely unacceptable" and the team's non-executive chairman Niki Lauda echoed his colleague's view, "If these things happen at the end of the race when they are fighting, we can talk about it. But on the second lap, it is ridiculous." Rosberg denied Hamilton's version of the internal meeting two days after the race and that there was "a very good and important discussion after the race, everybody gave their opinion and now we move forward". The championship's governing body, the Fédération Internationale de l'Automobile (FIA), said Hamilton's claims did not warrant a review under the FIA International Sporting Code, which states if "a new element was discovered" regardless of the stewards' decision, a second meeting had to be convened to address it.

Five days after the race Mercedes held a meeting between senior members of the team (including Wolff and technical director Paddy Lowe) and both drivers to determine what measures were to be taken to maintain their championship aspirations. Rosberg incurred an undisclosed punishment during the half-hour conference and he and Hamilton were allowed to continue battling each other for the rest of the season without the imposition of team orders favouring one driver over the other. Rosberg accepted responsibility for causing the contact from an "error of judgement" and apologised to Hamilton, Mercedes and Formula One fans. Hamilton admitted through a statement he made errors during the rivalry with Rosberg over the course of the season but believed it would be an error to apportion blame to one driver, "There is a deep foundation that still exists for me and Nico to work from, in spite of our difficult times and differences."

The stewards deemed Magnussen to have provided Alonso with inadequate space and forced him to go off the track on the Kemmel Straight while lapping Ericsson. They imposed a 20-second time penalty on Magnussen, demoting him from fifth to 12th and elevating Alonso to seventh and Hülkenberg to tenth. Alonso said he was unconcerned since he was battling for position outside of the top five, "He was lapping a Caterham and we were all in the slipstream. I tried to overtake and he closed maybe a little bit too much because half the car was on the grass." Magnussen commented on the penalty, "Everyone around me had slightly fresher tyres and they're not the easiest guys to keep behind. So I just tried my best to defend my position as well as I could." The McLaren racing director Éric Boullier argued Magnussen's move needed to be embraced by Formula One and believed the driver had made adequate progress in 2014,

"Obviously it is part of the experience he is gaining over the season. He is very motivated. He is new to the category and it is nice to see the big boys a pushing a little bit to show him 'stay behind, kid'. It is part of the learning process, so it is good. I think it is not easy to step into F1, especially with a top team. There is a lot of pressure in delivering when there is no more testing. It is not easy."

The race result increased Rosberg's lead in the World Drivers' Championship to 29 championship points over his teammate Hamilton in second place. Ricciardo's victory kept him in third with 126 championship points, while Alonso's seventh-place finish moved him to 11 championship points ahead of Bottas in fifth. In the World Constructors' Championship, Mercedes (with 411 championship points) maintained their lead over second-placed Red Bull (254 championship points). Ferrari in third place increased the gap over Williams in fourth to ten championship points as McLaren overtook Force India for fifth with seven races left in the season.

=== Race classification ===
Drivers who scored championship points are denoted in bold.

Pos.	No.	Driver	Constructor	Laps	Time/Retired	Grid	Points
1	3	(Australia) **Daniel Ricciardo**	**Red Bull Racing-Renault**	44	1:24:36.556	5	25
2	6	(Germany) **Nico Rosberg**	**Mercedes**	44	+3.383	1	18
3	77	(Finland) **Valtteri Bottas**	**Williams-Mercedes**	44	+28.032	6	15
4	7	(Finland) **Kimi Räikkönen**	**Ferrari**	44	+36.815	8	12
5	1	(Germany) **Sebastian Vettel**	**Red Bull Racing-Renault**	44	+52.196	3	10
6	22	(United Kingdom) **Jenson Button**	**McLaren-Mercedes**	44	+54.580	10	8
7	14	(Spain) **Fernando Alonso**	**Ferrari**	44	+1:01.162	4	6
8	11	(Mexico) **Sergio Pérez**	**Force India-Mercedes**	44	+1:04.293	13	4
9	26	(Russia) **Daniil Kvyat**	**Toro Rosso-Renault**	44	+1:05.347	11	2
10	27	(Germany) **Nico Hülkenberg**	**Force India-Mercedes**	44	+1:05.697	18	1
11	25	(France) Jean-Éric Vergne	Toro Rosso-Renault	44	+1:11.920	12	
12^{1}	20	(Denmark) Kevin Magnussen	McLaren-Mercedes	44	+1:14.262	7	
13	19	(Brazil) Felipe Massa	Williams-Mercedes	44	+1:15.975	9	
14	99	(Germany) Adrian Sutil	Sauber-Ferrari	44	+1:22.447	14	
15	21	(Mexico) Esteban Gutiérrez	Sauber-Ferrari	44	+1:30.825	20	
16	4	(United Kingdom) Max Chilton	Marussia-Ferrari	43	+1 lap	19	
17	9	(Sweden) Marcus Ericsson	Caterham-Renault	43	+1 lap	22	
18	17	(France) Jules Bianchi	Marussia-Ferrari	39	Gearbox	16	
Ret	44	(United Kingdom) Lewis Hamilton	Mercedes	38	Collision damage	2	
Ret	8	(France) Romain Grosjean	Lotus-Renault	33	Power unit	15	
Ret	45	(Germany) André Lotterer	Caterham-Renault	1	Electrical	21	
Ret	13	(Venezuela) Pastor Maldonado	Lotus-Renault	1	Exhaust	17	

Notes:

- **^1** – Kevin Magnussen originally finished sixth but had 20 seconds added to his race time for forcing Fernando Alonso off track.

== Championship standings after the race ==
Drivers' Championship standings

+/–	Pos.	Driver	Points
	1	(Germany) Nico Rosberg	220
	2	(United Kingdom) Lewis Hamilton	191
	3	(Australia) Daniel Ricciardo	156
	4	(Spain) Fernando Alonso	121
	5	(Finland) Valtteri Bottas	110

Constructors' Championship standings

+/–	Pos.	Constructor	Points
	1	(Germany) Mercedes	411
	2	(Austria) Red Bull Racing-Renault	254
	3	(Italy) Ferrari	160
	4	(United Kingdom) Williams-Mercedes	150
1	5	(United Kingdom) McLaren-Mercedes	105
Sources:

- Note: Only the top five positions are included for both sets of standings.

== See also ==
- 2014 Spa-Francorchamps GP2 Series round
- 2014 Spa-Francorchamps GP3 Series round

== Footnotes ==
Previous race: 2014 Hungarian Grand Prix	FIA Formula One World Championship; 2014 season	Next race: 2014 Italian Grand Prix
Previous race: 2013 Belgian Grand Prix	Belgian Grand Prix	Next race: 2015 Belgian Grand Prix
