= 24 Hours of Spa =

Endurance racing event for cars held annually in Belgium

GT World Challenge Europe Intercontinental GT Challenge
- Venue: Circuit de Spa-Francorchamps
- Location: Stavelot, Belgium; 50°26′14″N 5°58′17″E
- Corporate sponsor: Crowdstrike
- First race: 1924
- First GTWCE & IGTC race: 2016
- Last race: 2026
- Duration: 24 hours
- Most wins (driver): (Belgium) Eric van de Poele (5)
- Most wins (manufacturer): (Germany) BMW (25)

Circuit information
- Length: 7.004 km (4.352 mi)
- Turns: 19
- Lap record: 1:44.361 ( Kimi Antonelli, Mercedes W17, 2026, F1)

The 24 Hours of Spa is an endurance racing event for cars held annually since 1924 at the Circuit de Spa-Francorchamps, Stavelot, Belgium. It is currently sponsored by CrowdStrike.

== History ==
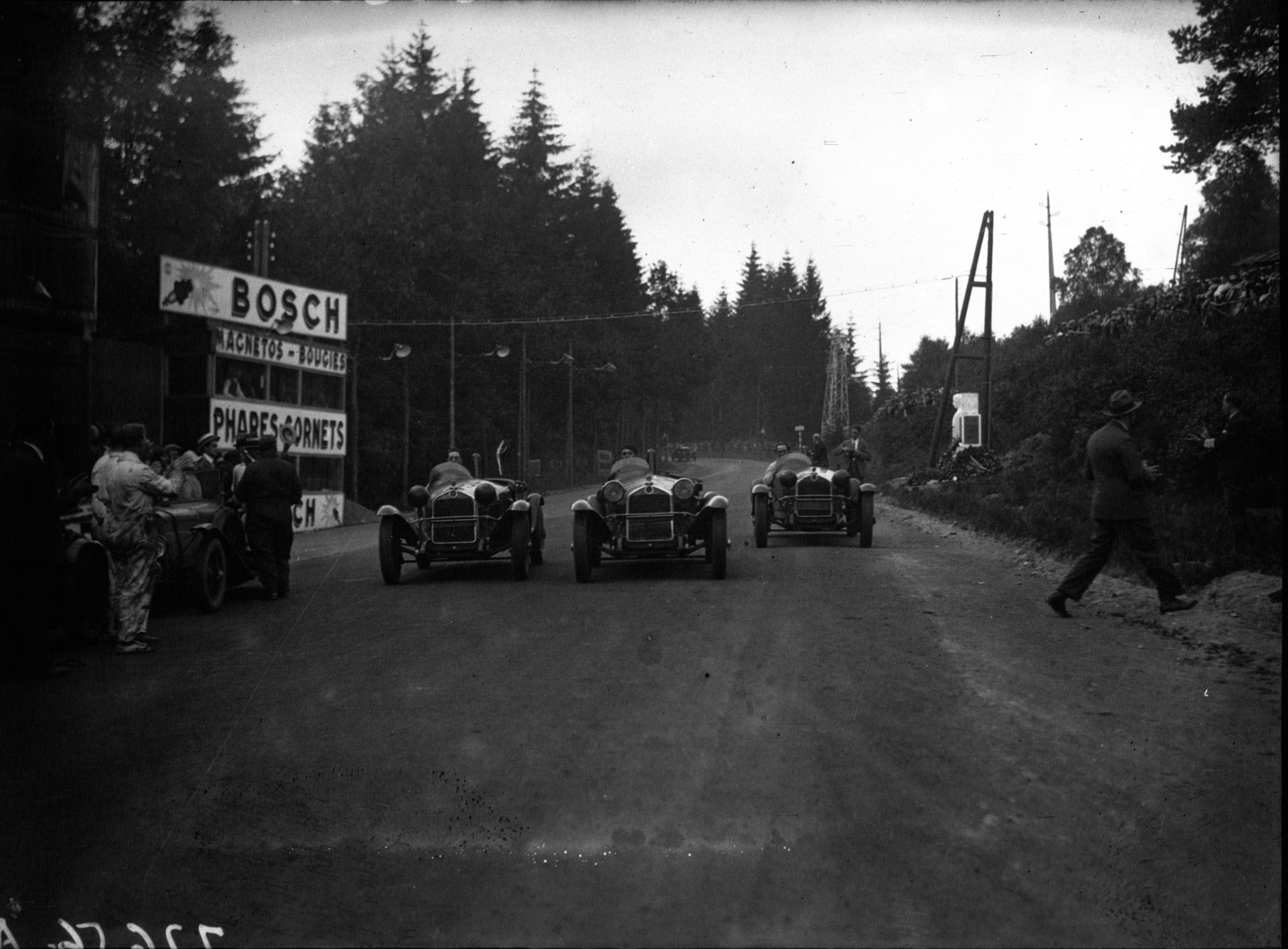
Alfa Romeos after triple win in 1930

The Spa 24 Hours was conceived by Jules de Their and Henri Langlois Van Ophem just one year after the inaugural 24 Hours of Le Mans was run. It debuted in 1924 over a 15 kilometres (9.3 mi) circuit on public roads between the towns of Francorchamps, Malmedy and Stavelot, under the auspices of the Royal Automobile Club of Belgium (RACB). The present 7.004 kilometres (4.352 mi) circuit was inaugurated in 1979 with only slight variations since then.

The Spa 24 Hours was part of the European Touring Car Championship from 1966 to 1973, again in 1976 and from 1982 to 1988 (with the exception of 1987 when it was part of the inaugural World Touring Car Championship). The event also counted towards the World Sportscar Championship in 1953 and the World Endurance Championship in 1981. As on the Nürburgring, both a 24h and a 1000 km race is held at Spa, as the 1000 km Spa for sports car racing were introduced in 1966.

Cars entered have spanned from the Russian Moskvitch and models with sub-1 liter engines such as the NSU Prinz TT to the luxurious V8-powered Mercedes-Benz 300 SEL 6.3. Tuned by Mercedes-AMG, the 6834 cc and 420 hp (313 kW) so-called "Red pig" finished as high as second in 1971.

During the 1975 race, Dutch driver Wim Boshuis and a track marshal were killed in two separate incidents. Boshuis was killed when his vehicle collided with other cars on the track, while the track marshal was killed 30 minutes later when Belgian driver Alain Peltier collided with a railing.

With the participation of Swiss Lilian Bryner on the victorious Ferrari 550 of the BMS Scuderia Italia team, the 2004 race marked the first time in history that a female driver was part of the winning team of a 24-hour endurance race in a Gran Turismo with more than 500 hp (370 kW).

The current version of the Spa 24 Hours is an event under the GT World Challenge Europe Powered by AWS and Intercontinental GT Challenge calendar, although it was previously run as part of the FIA GT Championship featuring GT1 and GT2 machinery, and by various touring car series. Currently, the cars run fall under the FIA GT3 and GT3 Cup classifications. It has also been a round of the SRO Group's Intercontinental GT Challenge since its inaugural season in 2016.

2020 saw the race held behind closed doors for the first time due to the COVID-19 pandemic.

In September 2022, the 2023 Belgian Grand Prix Formula One race was scheduled to be held on July 28–30, which clashed with the traditional date of the Spa 24 Hours, so the latter was forced to be rescheduled to early July.

=== Coupe du Roi ===
The best manufacturer wins the Coupe du Roi (King's Cup), which is not necessarily the race winners. The cup is won by the manufacturer with the most points, accrued by cars that are made by the same manufacturer. For example, Australian car manufacturer Holden won the Coupe du Roi in 1986 despite their cars finishing the race in 18th, 22nd and 23rd positions outright.

== List of winners ==
Year	Drivers	Team	Car	Layout	Distance (km)	Average (km/h)	Series	Notes
1924	(France) Maurice Becquet (France) Henri Springuel	(France) Établissements Industriels Jacques Bignan	Bignan 2 Litre Sport	15 km	1879.992	78.333		First running of the race.
1925	(France) André Lagache (France) René Léonard	(France) Chenard-Walcker SA	Chenard-Walcker Type U 22CV Sport	15 km	2203.920	91.830		
1926	(France) André Boillot (France) Louis Rigal	(France) Société des Automobiles Peugeot	Peugeot Type 174 Sport	15 km	2294.600	95.618		
1927	(France) Robert Sénéchal (Belgium) Nicolas Caerels	(Belgium) Automobiles Excelsior SA	Excelsior Adex C	15 km	2203.200	91.8000		
1928	(Russia) Boris Ivanowski (Note: Ivanowski was a Russian national, but in exile since the Russian Revolution) (Italy) Attilio Marinoni	(Russia) Boris Ivanowski	Alfa Romeo 6C-1500 Super Sport	15 km	2463.900	102.600		
1929	(France) Robert Benoist (Italy) Attilio Marinoni	(Italy) SA Italiana Ing. Nicola Romeo	Alfa Romeo 6C-1750 Super Sport	15 km	2441.200	101.300		
1930	(Italy) Attilio Marinoni (Italy) Pietro Ghersi	(Italy) SA Italiana Ing. Nicola Romeo	Alfa Romeo 6C-1750 Gran Sport	15 km	2624.640	109.360		
1931	(Russia) Dimitri Jorjadze (Note: Jorjadze was a Russian national, but in exile since the Russian Revolution) (Italy) Goffredo Zehender	(Russia) Dimitri Jorjadze	Mercedes-Benz SSK	15 km	2543.750	105.990		
1932	(Italy) Antonio Brivio (Italy) Eugenio Siena	(Italy) Scuderia Ferrari	Alfa Romeo 8C-2300 LM	15 km	2785.920	116.080		
1933	(Monaco) Louis Chiron (Italy) Luigi Chinetti	(Italy) Luigi Chinetti	Alfa Romeo 8C-2300 MM-LM	15 km	2806.316	116.934		
1934	(France) Jean Desvignes (France) Norbert Mahé	(France) Norbert-Jean Mahé	Bugatti Type 44	15 km	1166.110	116.615		Reduced to 10 hours.
1935	Not held							
1936	(Italy) Francesco Severi (France) Raymond Sommer	(Italy) Scuderia Ferrari	Alfa Romeo 8C 2900A	15 km	3001.032	125.043		
1937	Not held							
1938	(Italy) Carlo Pintacuda (Italy) Francesco Severi	(Italy) Alfa Corse	Alfa Romeo 8C 2900B	15 km	2996.632	124.859		
1939 – 1947	Not held due to World War II and circuit was reconstructed							
1948	(United Kingdom) St. John Horsfall (United Kingdom) Leslie Johnson	(United Kingdom) Aston Martin Lagonda Limited	Aston Martin 2-Litre Sports	15 km	2711.040	115.985		
1949	(United States) Luigi Chinetti (France) Jean Lucas	(United States) Luigi Chinetti	Ferrari 166 MM	15 km	3043.580	126.816		
1950 – 1952	Not held							
1953	(Italy) Giuseppe Farina (United Kingdom) Mike Hawthorn	(Italy) Scuderia Ferrari	Ferrari 375 MM Pinin Farina	14 km	3671.000	152.742	World Sportscar Championship.	First use of 14 km layout.
1954 – 1963	Not held							
1964	(Belgium) Robert Crevits (Belgium) Gustave Gosselin	(West Germany) Daimler Benz AG	Mercedes-Benz 300 SE	14 km	3962.100	164.825		Second win for Mercedes-Benz, won by the legendary 300 SE L “Red Pig”.
1965	(Belgium) Pascal Ickx (Belgium) Gérard Langlois van Ophem	(West Germany) Bayerische Motoren Werke AG	BMW 1800 Ti/SA	14 km	3812.591	158.855		
1966	(West Germany) Hubert Hahne (Belgium) Jacky Ickx	(West Germany) Bayerische Motoren Werke AG	BMW 2000 Ti	14 km	4048.368	168.681	European Touring Car Championship	
1967	(Belgium) Jean-Pierre Gaban (Belgium) Noël Van Assche	(Belgium) Jean-Pierre Gaban	Porsche 911	14 km	4052.883	168.867	European Touring Car Championship	
1968	(West Germany) Erwin Kremer (West Germany) Willi Kauhsen (West Germany) Helmut Kelleners	(West Germany) Auto Kremer Racing Team	Porsche 911	14 km	4004.827	166.867	European Touring Car Championship	
1969	(France) Guy Chasseuil (France) Claude Ballot-Léna	Sonauto-Porsche France	Porsche 911	14 km	4272.231	187.006	European Touring Car Championship	
1970	(Austria) Günther Huber (West Germany) Helmut Kelleners	(West Germany) BMW Alpina	BMW 2800 CS	14 km	4252.407	177.183	European Touring Car Championship	
1971	(West Germany) Dieter Glemser (Spain) Alex Soler-Roig	(West Germany) Ford Motorenwerke Deutschland	Ford Capri RS	14 km	4385.100	182.690	European Touring Car Championship	
1972	(West Germany) Jochen Mass (West Germany) Hans-Joachim Stuck	(West Germany) Ford Motorenwerke Deutschland	Ford Capri RS 2600	14 km	4498.436	187.431	European Touring Car Championship	All time distance record.
1973	(Netherlands) Toine Hezemans (Austria) Dieter Quester	(West Germany) BMW Motorsport GmbH	BMW 3.0 CSL	14 km	4422.980	184.290	European Touring Car Championship	
1974	(Belgium) Jean Xhenceval (Belgium) Alain Peltier	(Belgium) Luigi Racing	BMW 3.0 CSi	14 km	4147.289	172.804	Trophée de l'Avenir	Pierre Dieudonné was an entered driver but did not drive.
1975	(Belgium) Jean Xhenceval (Belgium) Hughes de Fierlandt	(Belgium) Luigi Racing	BMW 3.0 CSi	14 km	4249.270	177.053	Trophée de l'Avenir	Pierre Dieudonné was an entered driver but did not drive.
1976	(Belgium) Jean-Marie Detrin (Luxembourg) Nico Demuth (Belgium) Charles Van Stalle	(Belgium) Ecurie Jemeda-Assoc. Interim	BMW 3.0 CSL	14 km	4087.904	170.329	European Touring Car Championship	
1977	(Belgium) Eddy Joosen (France) Jean-Claude Andruet	(Belgium) Kinley BMW Castrol-Juma Racing	BMW 530 i	14 km	4083.835	170.159	Trophée de l'Avenir	
1978	(United Kingdom) Gordon Spice (Belgium) Teddy Pilette	(Belgium) Belga Castrol Team (United Kingdom) Gordon Spice Racing	Ford Capri III 3.0S	14 km	4315.594	179.816	Trophée de l'Avenir	
1979	(Belgium) Jean-Michel Martin (Belgium) Philippe Martin	(Belgium) Belga Castrol Team (United Kingdom) Gordon Spice Racing	Ford Capri III 3.0S	7 km	3083.632	128.485	Trophée de l'Avenir	First use of 7 km layout.
1980	(Belgium) Jean-Michel Martin (Belgium) Philippe Martin	(Belgium) Belga Castrol Team (United Kingdom) Gordon Spice Racing	Ford Capri III 3.0 S	7 km	2952.318	123.013		First team to win back-to-back races. The Ford Capri took its 5th win and 3rd in a row.
1981	(Belgium) Pierre Dieudonné (United Kingdom) Tom Walkinshaw	(United Kingdom) Mazda Motul TWR Team	Mazda RX-7	7 km	3183.952	132.737	World Endurance Championship; Trophée de l'Avenir	First Japanese manufacturer to win.
1982	(West Germany) Hans Heyer (West Germany) Armin Hahne (Belgium) Eddy Joosen	(Belgium) Bastos Joosen Juma Racing	BMW 528 i	7 km	3132.224	130.808	European Touring Car Championship	
1983	(Belgium) Thierry Tassin (West Germany) Hans Heyer (West Germany) Armin Hahne	(Belgium) Bastos Juma Racing Team	BMW 635 CSi	7 km	3333.726	130.808	European Touring Car Championship	
1984	(West Germany) Hans Heyer (United Kingdom) Tom Walkinshaw (United Kingdom) Win Percy	(United Kingdom) TWR Jaguar Racing with Motul	Jaguar XJS	7 km	3055.485	131.091	European Touring Car Championship	
1985	(Italy) Roberto Ravaglia (Switzerland) Marc Surer (Austria) Gerhard Berger	(West Germany) BMW Belgium Team Schnitzer	BMW 635 CSi	7 km	3470.000	144.344	European Touring Car Championship	
1986	(Austria) Dieter Quester (West Germany) Altfrid Heger (Belgium) Thierry Tassin	(West Germany) BMW Belgium Team Schnitzer	BMW 635 CSi	7 km	3463.060	144.232	European Touring Car Championship	
1987	(Belgium) Jean-Michel Martin (Belgium) Didier Theys (Belgium) Eric van de Poele	(Belgium) Waterloo Motors-Lease Plan	BMW M3	7 km	3338.140	139.908	World Touring Car Championship	
1988	(West Germany) Altfrid Heger (Austria) Dieter Quester (Italy) Roberto Ravaglia	(West Germany) BMW Motorsport Team Schnitzer	BMW M3	7 km	3532.460	146.929	European Touring Car Championship	
1989	(Italy) Gianfranco Brancatelli (United Kingdom) Win Percy (West Germany) Bernd Schneider	(Switzerland) Bastos Racing Team Eggenberger	Ford Sierra RS500	7 km	3338.140	139.130		Sixth win for Ford, and the first since 1980 with the Capri.
1990	(West Germany) Markus Oestreich (France) Fabien Giroix (Venezuela) Johnny Cecotto	(West Germany) BMW M Team Schnitzer	BMW M3 Evolution	7 km	3247.920	135.330		
1991	(Sweden) Anders Olofsson (Australia) David Brabham (Japan) Naoki Hattori	(Japan) Team Zexel	Nissan Skyline R32 GT-R	7 km	3587.980	149.456		
1992	(United Kingdom) Steve Soper (Belgium) Jean-Michel Martin (Germany) Christian Danner	(Italy) BMW Fina Bastos Team Bigazzi	BMW M3 Evolution	7 km	3560.220	148.947		
1993	(Germany) Uwe Alzen (Brazil) Christian Fittipaldi (France) Jean-Pierre Jarier	(Germany) Roock Porsche Racing	Porsche 911 RSR	7 km	2154.904	144.667		Race stopped after 15 hours due to the death of King Baudouin.
1994	(Italy) Roberto Ravaglia (Belgium) Thierry Tassin (Germany) Alexander Burgstaller	(Italy) BMW Fina Bastos Team Bigazzi	BMW 318 is	7 km	3625.960	151.047		
1995	(Germany) Joachim Winkelhock (United Kingdom) Steve Soper (Netherlands) Peter Kox	(Germany) BMW Fina Bastos Team Schnitzer	BMW 320 i	7 km	3612.532	150.531		
1996	(Germany) Jörg Müller (Germany) Alexander Burgstaller (Belgium) Thierry Tassin	(Italy) BMW Fina Bastos Team Bigazzi	BMW 320 i	7 km	3507.821	145.956		
1997	(Belgium) Didier de Radiguès (Belgium) Marc Duez (France) Éric Hélary	(Italy) BMW Fina Bastos Team Bigazzi	BMW 320 i	7 km	3372.680	140.252		
1998	(France) Alain Cudini (Belgium) Marc Duez (Belgium) Eric van de Poele	(Belgium) Fina Bastos Juma Racing	BMW 318 i	7 km	3344.807	139.344		
1999	(Belgium) Frédéric Bouvy (France) Emmanuel Collard (France) Anthony Beltoise	(Belgium) Peugeot Team Belgique Luxembourg	Peugeot 306 GTI	7 km	3428.427	142.588		
2000	(France) Didier Defourny (Belgium) Frédéric Bouvy (Belgium) Kurt Mollekens	(Belgium) Peugeot Team Belgique Luxembourg	Peugeot 306 GTI	7 km	3330.870	138.686		Second team to win back-to-back races. Third win for Peugeot. Last race for touring cars.
2001	(Belgium) Marc Duez (France) Christophe Bouchut (France) Jean-Philippe Belloc	(France) Larbre Compétition-Chereau	Chrysler Viper GTS-R	7 km	3679.104	152.999	FIA GT Championship	First race for GT cars. First win for Daimler AG since 1964. (Chrysler was a Mercedes-Benz Group brand from 1999 to 2006.)
2002	(France) Christophe Bouchut (France) Sébastien Bourdais (France) David Terrien (Belgium) Vincent Vosse	(France) Larbre Compétition	Chrysler Viper GTS-R	7 km	3654.059	152.019	FIA GT Championship	Third team to win back-to-back races.
2003	(France) Romain Dumas (Monaco) Stéphane Ortelli (Germany) Marc Lieb	(Germany) Freisinger Motorsport	Porsche 911 GT3-RS	7 km	3327.613	138.557	FIA GT Championship	
2004	(Italy) Luca Cappellari (Italy) Fabrizio Gollin (Switzerland) Lilian Bryner (Switzerland) Enzo Calderari	(Italy) BMS Scuderia Italia	Ferrari 550-GTS Maranello	7 km	3888.144	161.974	FIA GT Championship	Third win for Ferrari, and the first since 1958. First and only victory for a female driver.
2005	(Germany) Michael Bartels (Germany) Timo Scheider (Belgium) Eric van de Poele	(Germany) Vitaphone Racing Team	Maserati MC12	7 km	4000.896	166.638	FIA GT Championship	First ever victory for Maserati.
2006	(Belgium) Eric van de Poele (Germany) Michael Bartels (Italy) Andrea Bertolini	(Germany) Vitaphone Racing Team	Maserati MC12	7 km	4092.961	171.034	FIA GT Championship	Fourth team to win back-to-back races since Larbre Compétition in 2002.
2007	(Italy) Fabrizio Gollin (Netherlands) Mike Hezemans (Switzerland) Jean-Denis Délétraz (Switzerland) Marcel Fässler	(Netherlands) Carsport Holland	Chevrolet Corvette C6.R	7 km	3726.660	155.241	FIA GT Championship	
2008	(Germany) Michael Bartels (Italy) Andrea Bertolini (France) Stéphane Sarrazin (Belgium) Eric van de Poele	(Germany) Vitaphone Racing Team	Maserati MC12	7 km	4041.885	168.096	FIA GT Championship	Third win for the Maserati MC12.
2009	(Belgium) Anthony Kumpen (Belgium) Kurt Mollekens (Netherlands) Mike Hezemans (Netherlands) Jos Menten	(Belgium) PK Carsport	Chevrolet Corvette C6.R	7 km	3915.236	163.128	FIA GT Championship	
2010	(France) Romain Dumas (Austria) Martin Ragginger (Germany) Jörg Bergmeister (Germany) Wolf Henzler	(Italy) BMS Scuderia Italia	Porsche 997 GT3-RSR	7 km	3789.164	157.832		First team to win with two different manufacturers.
2011	(Germany) Timo Scheider (Belgium) Greg Franchi (Sweden) Mattias Ekström	(Belgium) Audi Sport Team WRT	Audi R8 LMS	7 km	3817.180	158.898	Blancpain Endurance Series	First ever victory for Audi.
2012	(Italy) Andrea Piccini (Germany) René Rast (Germany) Frank Stippler	(Germany) Audi Sport Performance Team Phoenix	Audi R8 LMS	7 km	3565.036	148.543	Blancpain Endurance Series	
2013	(Germany) Bernd Schneider (Germany) Maximilian Götz (Germany) Maximilian Buhk	(Germany) HTP Motorsport	Mercedes-Benz SLS AMG GT3	7 km	3950.256	164.594	Blancpain Endurance Series	Third win for Mercedes-Benz, and the first since 1964.
2014	(Germany) René Rast (Germany) Markus Winkelhock (Belgium) Laurens Vanthoor	(Belgium) Belgian Audi Club Team WRT	Audi R8 LMS ultra	7 km	3691.108	153.732	Blancpain Endurance Series	Red flag (1 hour).
2015	(Netherlands) Nick Catsburg (Germany) Lucas Luhr (Finland) Markus Palttala	(Belgium) BMW Sports Trophy Team Marc VDS	BMW Z4 GT3	7 km	3754.144	156.423	Blancpain Endurance Series	
2016	(Austria) Philipp Eng (Belgium) Maxime Martin (United Kingdom) Alexander Sims	(Germany) ROWE Racing	BMW M6 GT3	7 km	3719.403	154.975	Blancpain GT Series Endurance Cup; Intercontinental GT Challenge	
2017	(France) Jules Gounon (Germany) Christopher Haase (Germany) Markus Winkelhock	(France) Audi Sport Team Saintéloc	Audi R8 LMS	7 km	3824.184	159.341	Blancpain GT Series Endurance Cup; Intercontinental GT Challenge	
2018	(United Kingdom) Tom Blomqvist (Austria) Philipp Eng (Norway) Christian Krognes	(Germany) Walkenhorst Motorsport	BMW M6 GT3	7 km	3579.044	149.127	Blancpain GT Series Endurance Cup; Intercontinental GT Challenge	
2019	(Denmark) Michael Christensen (France) Kévin Estre (Austria) Richard Lietz	(United Arab Emirates) GPX Racing	Porsche 911 GT3 R	7 km	2542.45	105.78	Blancpain GT Series Endurance Cup; Intercontinental GT Challenge	First team from the Middle East to win. 18-hour race. Racing suspended from 4:00 AM to 11:30 AM (rain), initially by safety car, then red flag at 5:40 AM.
2020	(New Zealand) Earl Bamber (United Kingdom) Nick Tandy (Belgium) Laurens Vanthoor	(Germany) Rowe Racing	Porsche 911 GT3 R	7 km	3691.10	153.7	GT World Challenge Europe Endurance Cup; Intercontinental GT Challenge	Second team to win with two different manufacturers after BMS Scuderia Italia.
2021	(France) Côme Ledogar (Denmark) Nicklas Nielsen (Italy) Alessandro Pier Guidi	(Italy) Iron Lynx	Ferrari 488 GT3 Evo 2020	7 km	3894.22	162.0	GT World Challenge Europe Endurance Cup; Intercontinental GT Challenge	Fourth win for Ferrari, and the first since 2004.
2022	(France) Jules Gounon (Spain) Daniel Juncadella (Switzerland) Raffaele Marciello	(France) AMG Team AKKodis ASP	Mercedes-AMG GT3 Evo	7 km	3754.14	156.2	GT World Challenge Europe Endurance Cup; Intercontinental GT Challenge	Fourth win for Mercedes-Benz
2023	(Austria) Philipp Eng (Germany) Marco Wittmann (United Kingdom) Nick Yelloly	(Germany) ROWE Racing	BMW M4 GT3	7 km	3761.14	156.7	GT World Challenge Europe Endurance Cup; Intercontinental GT Challenge	A record-extending twenty-fifth win for BMW.
2024	(Italy) Mattia Drudi (Denmark) Marco Sørensen (Denmark) Nicki Thiim	(Belgium) Comtoyou Racing	Aston Martin Vantage AMR GT3 Evo	7 km	3347.91	139.2	GT World Challenge Europe Endurance Cup; Intercontinental GT Challenge	Centenary edition. First win for a Belgian team since 2015, and first win for Aston Martin since 1948.
2025	(Italy) Mirko Bortolotti (Germany) Luca Engstler (South Africa) Jordan Pepper	(Austria) GRT - Grasser Racing Team	Lamborghini Huracán GT3 Evo 2	7 km	3845.196	160.2	GT World Challenge Europe Endurance Cup; Intercontinental GT Challenge	First ever victory for Lamborghini.
2026	(Denmark) Bastian Buus (Switzerland) Ricardo Feller (Austria) Thomas Preining	(Germany) Lionspeed GP	Porsche 911 GT3 R (992.2)		3789.16	158.0	GT World Challenge Europe Endurance Cup; Intercontinental GT Challenge	Ninth win for Porsche.

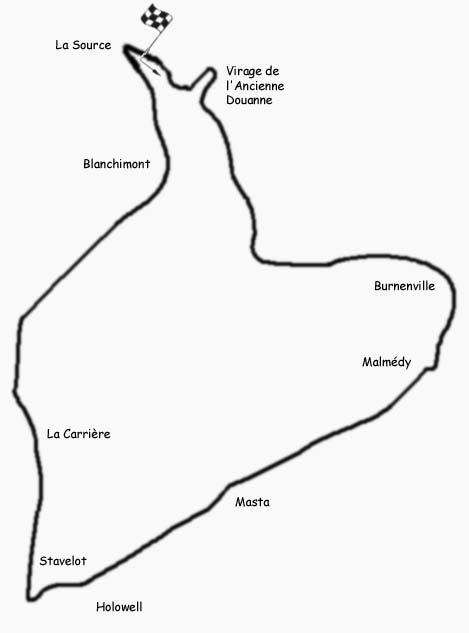
The original 15 km track layout (used from 1924 to 1949)

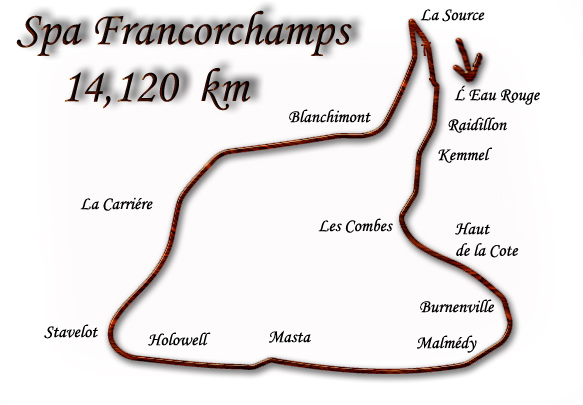
The quicker 14 km track layout (used from 1953 to 1978)

The slower 7 km modern track (used from 1979 onwards)

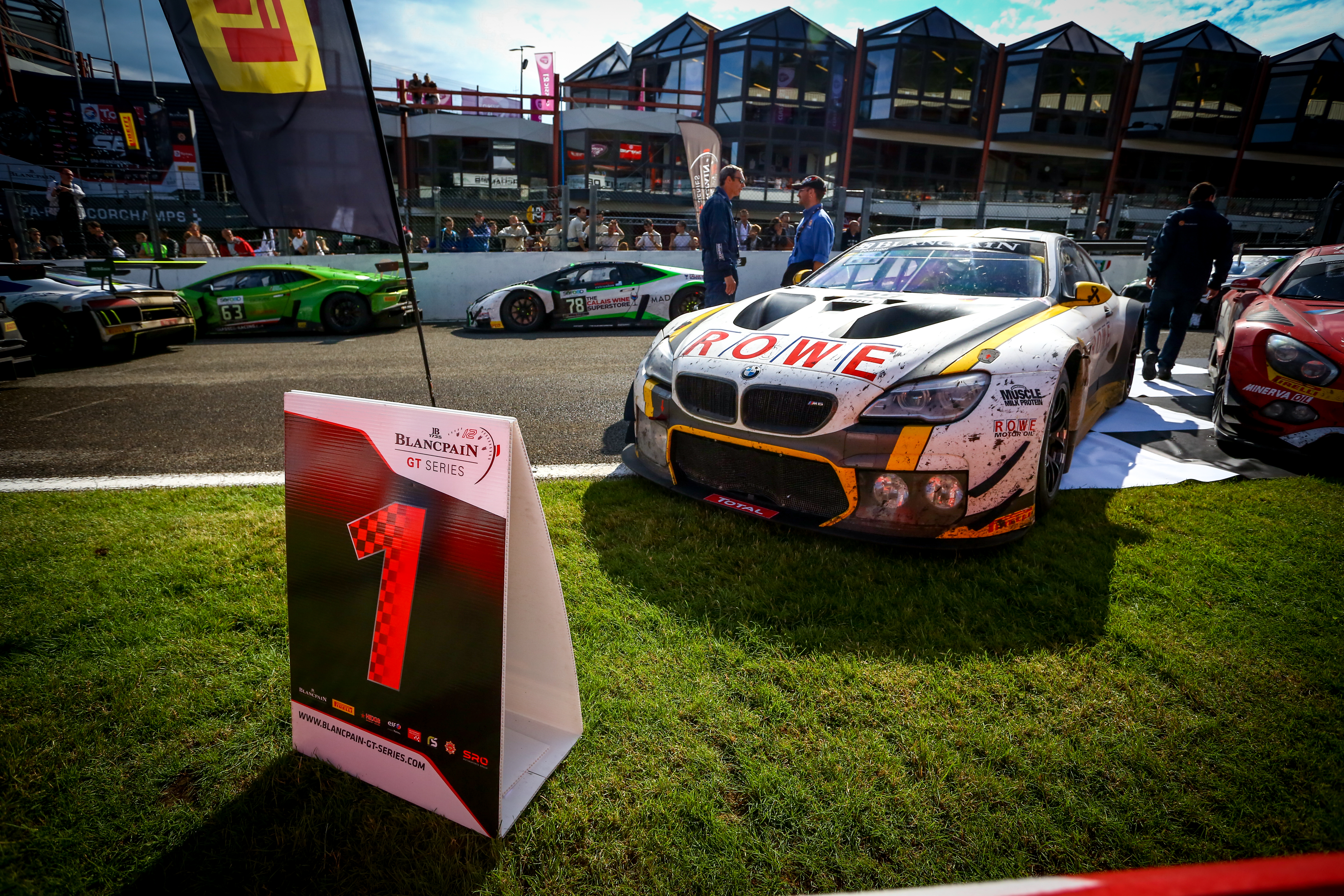
ROWE Racing BMW after win in 2016

== Statistics ==
=== By driver ===
Multiple wins by driver
Wins	Driver	Years
5	(Belgium) Eric van de Poele	1987, 1998, 2005, 2006, 2008
4	(Belgium) Jean-Michel Martin	1979, 1980, 1987, 1992
4	(Belgium) Thierry Tassin	1983, 1986, 1994, 1996
3	(Italy) Attilio Marinoni	1928, 1929, 1930
3	(West Germany) Hans Heyer	1982, 1983, 1984
3	(Austria) Dieter Quester	1973, 1986, 1988
3	(Italy) Roberto Ravaglia	1985, 1988, 1994
3	(Belgium) Marc Duez	1997, 1998, 2001
3	(Germany) Michael Bartels	2005, 2006, 2008
3	(Austria) Philipp Eng	2016, 2018, 2023
2	(Italy) Francesco Severi	1936, 1938
2	(United States) Luigi Chinetti	1933, 1949
2	(West Germany) Helmut Kelleners	1968, 1970
2	(Belgium) Jean Xhenceval	1974, 1975
2	(Belgium) Philippe Martin	1979, 1980
2	(Belgium) Eddy Joosen	1977, 1982
2	(West Germany) Armin Hahne	1982, 1983
2	(United Kingdom) Tom Walkinshaw	1981, 1984
2	(West Germany) Altfrid Heger	1986, 1988
2	(United Kingdom) Win Percy	1984, 1989
2	(United Kingdom) Steve Soper	1992, 1995
2	(Germany) Alexander Burgstaller	1994, 1996
2	(Belgium) Frédéric Bouvy	1999, 2000
2	(France) Christophe Bouchut	2001, 2002
2	(Italy) Fabrizio Gollin	2004, 2007
2	(Italy) Andrea Bertolini	2006, 2008
2	(Belgium) Kurt Mollekens	2000, 2009
2	(Netherlands) Mike Hezemans	2007, 2009
2	(France) Romain Dumas	2003, 2010
2	(Germany) Timo Scheider	2005, 2011
2	(Germany) Bernd Schneider	1989, 2013
2	(Germany) René Rast	2012, 2014
2	(Germany) Markus Winkelhock	2014, 2017
2	(Belgium) Laurens Vanthoor	2014, 2020
2	(France) Jules Gounon	2017, 2022

=== By manufacturer ===
Wins by manufacturer
Wins	Manufacturer	Years
25	(Germany) BMW	1965, 1966, 1970, 1973, 1974, 1975, 1976, 1977, 1982, 1983, 1985, 1986, 1987, 1988, 1990, 1992, 1994, 1995, 1996, 1997, 1998, 2015, 2016, 2018, 2023
9	(Germany) Porsche	1967, 1968, 1969, 1993, 2003, 2010, 2019, 2020, 2026
7	(Italy) Alfa Romeo	1928, 1929, 1930, 1932, 1933, 1936, 1938
6	(United States) Ford	1971, 1972, 1978, 1979, 1980, 1989
4	(Germany) Audi	2011, 2012, 2014, 2017
4	(Italy) Ferrari	1949, 1953, 2004, 2021
4	(Germany) Mercedes-Benz	1931, 1964, 2013, 2022
3	(France) Peugeot	1926, 1999, 2000
3	(Italy) Maserati	2005, 2006, 2008
2	(United States) Chrysler	2001, 2002
2	(United States) Chevrolet	2007, 2009
2	(United Kingdom) Aston Martin	1948, 2024
1	(Italy) Lamborghini	2025
1	(Japan) Nissan	1991
1	(United Kingdom) Jaguar	1984
1	(Japan) Mazda	1981
1	(France) Bugatti	1934
1	(Belgium) Excelsior	1927
1	(France) Chenard-Walcker	1925
1	(France) Bignan	1924

== See also ==
- GT World Challenge Europe
- GT World Challenge Europe Endurance Cup
- Intercontinental GT Challenge
