= Miesse =

Belgian vehicle manufacturer

Miesse was a Belgian maker of cars and trucks, active from 1894 to 1974.

== History ==
Jules Miesse set up a mechanical workshop in 1894, and built his first cars in 1896. In 1902 Thomas Turner & Company acquired a licence to build the cars in the United Kingdom - these Turner-Miesse cars were built until 1906. In 1927 the production of cars was discontinued, in favour of trucks and buses. Some were equipped with Diesel engines from German builder Junkers.

In 1929, Miesse acquired the Bollinckx works, who had produced since 1890 gas and steam engines, and compressors and tools for compressed air; this allowed increasing truck production to 100 per annum. The merged company was called Automobiles Miesse et Usines Bollinckx Société Anonyme; it was later renamed to Auto-Miesse.

After 1945, Miesse assembled Nash cars for the European market.

Miesse continued to exist till 1974.

== Cars ==
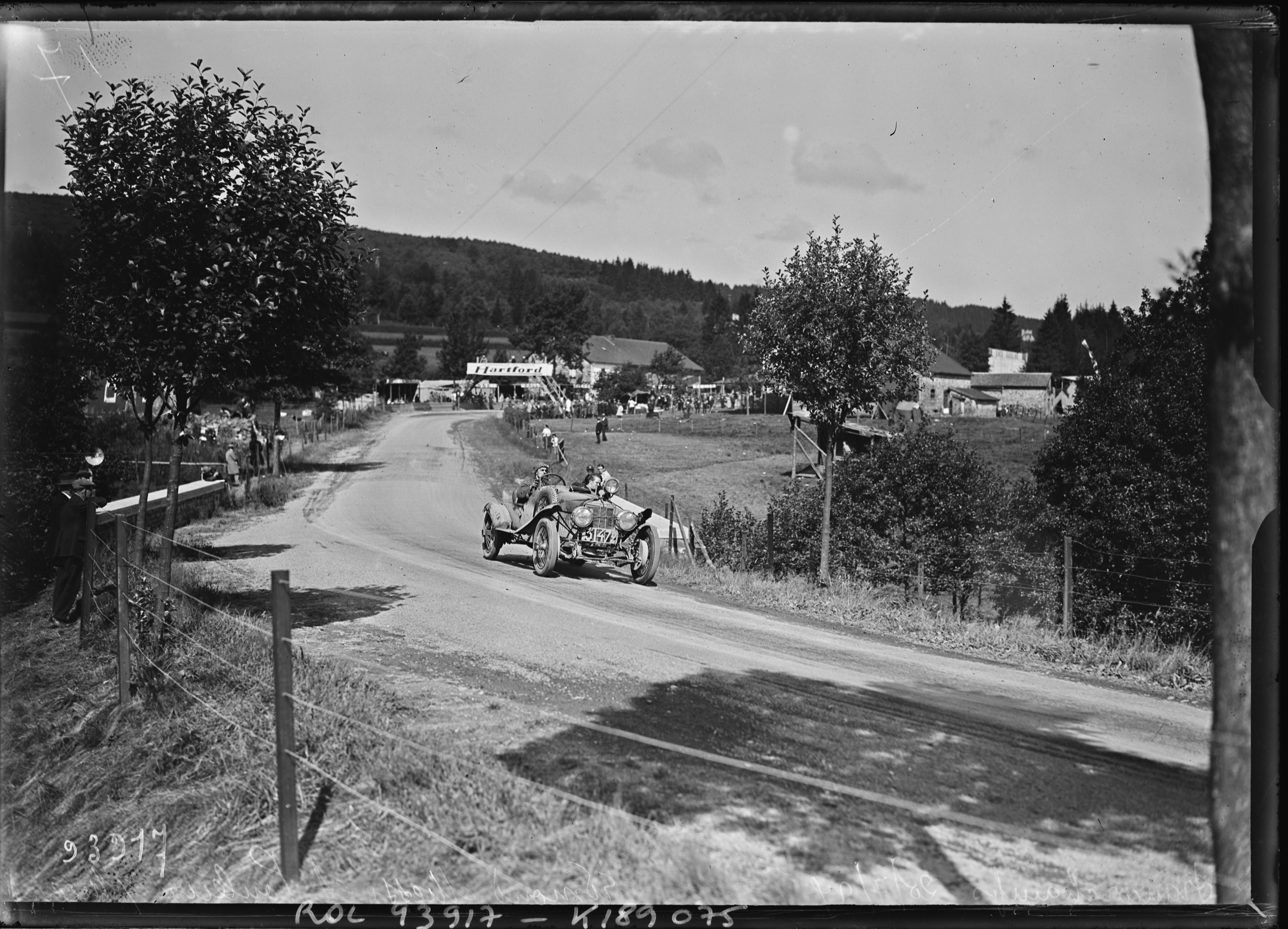
Edmond Miesse (son of Jules Miesse) and Pouleur in a Miesse at the 1924 Spa 24 Hours.

Jules Miesse built his first automobile in 1896, it was steam powered. Serial production followed only in 1898.

Construction of cars and trucks followed, till 1907 some of them some were powered by 3-cylinder steam engines. Their frames were of "strengthened" wood, and only the boiler under the "hood".

Petrol engines were first tried in 1900. Miesse gained fame in Brussels with the taxi cabs they started producing in 1904.

Post-WW1 cars from Miesse had undersquare engines (69 mm × 130 mm), either a 4-cylinder of 2.0 litres or an 8-cylinder 4-litre; both models had many components in common.
