= Mont des Brumes =

Ski resort in Wallonia, Belgium

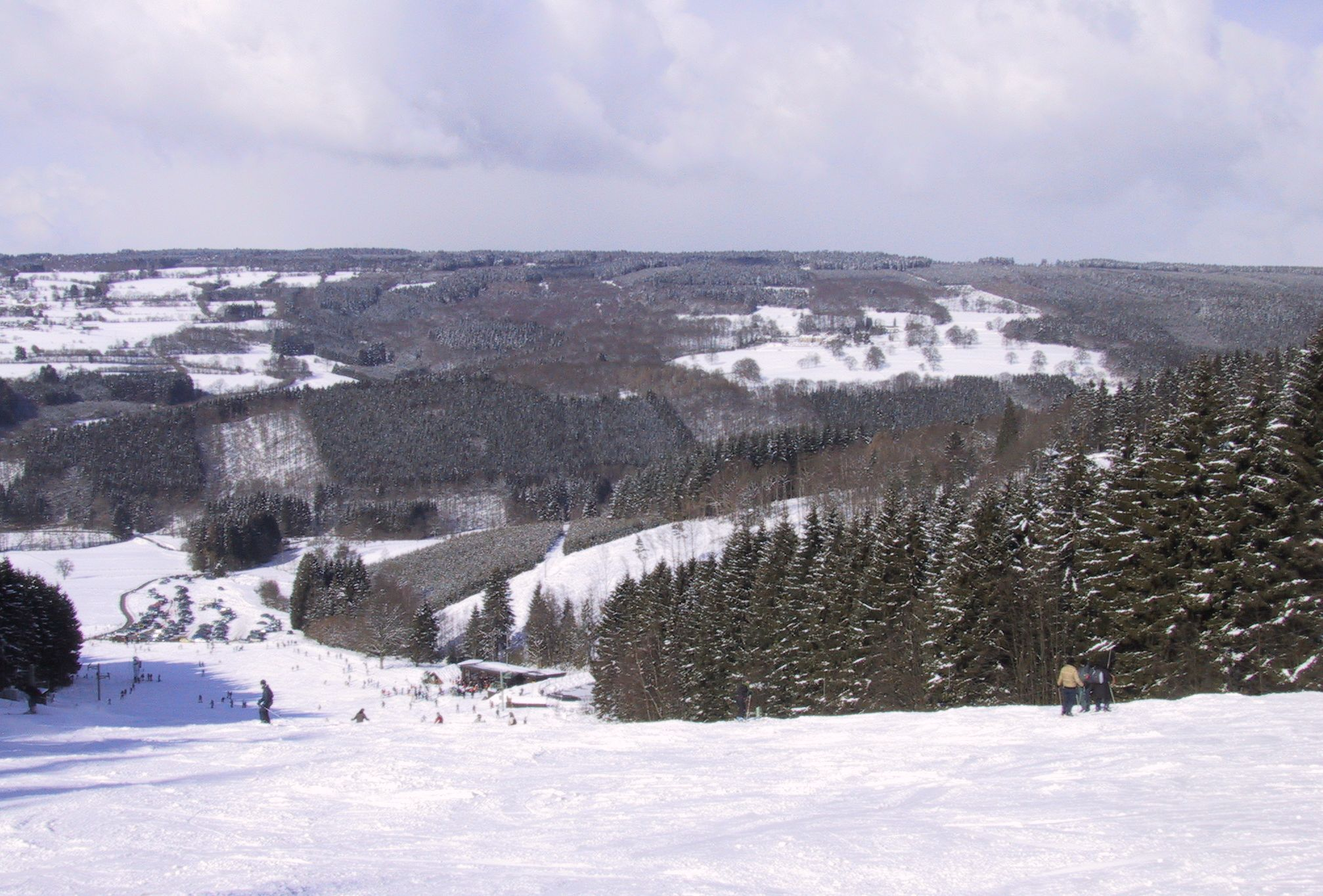
- Partial view of Mont des Brumes' piste in 2005

- Location in Belgium
- Location: Ardennes; Ruy, Belgium
- Nearest city: Francorchamps: 2.7 miles (4.3 km)
- Coordinates: 50°26′03″N 5°54′22″E
- Top elevation: 1,739 ft (530 m)
- Base elevation: 1,148 ft (350 m)
- Trails: 2 : 18% Beginner : 82% Intermediate
- Longest run: 0.53 miles (0.85 km)
- Lift system: 4 ski lifts (2 drag lifts, 1 baby-lift, 1 tow line)

Mont des Brumes is a ski resort located between Francorchamps and La Gleize, in the Belgian Ardennes. Though not the highest in Belgium, this resort has one of the longest alpine ski slopes in Belgium, including a red run 850 meters long with nearly 200 meters of vertical drop. The site also has a 150-meter beginners' track.

The resort has 4 ski lifts, including 2 drag lifts, 1 baby-lift and 1 tow line, with a total flow of more than 1000 skiers per hour.

== Gallery ==
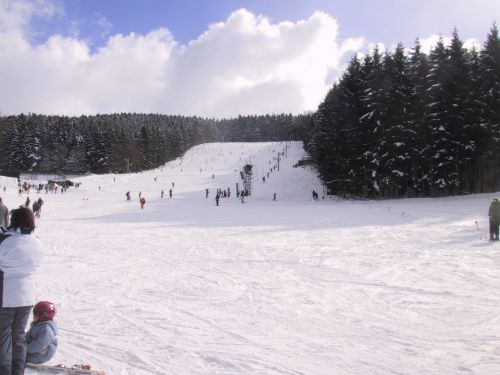
Piste at Mont des Brumes in 2005
