= Turner Manufacturing Company =

English vehicle and engine company

- Industry: Steam cars Agricultural machinery Engineering; Engine Manufacture; Truck Transmissions
- Predecessors: Thomas Turner & Company
- Founded: 1906
- Successor: Dana Corporation
- Headquarters: Wolverhampton, England
- Area served: Worldwide
- Products: Tractors; Winchess; Diesel Engines

The Turner Manufacturing Company was an engineering company based in Wolverhampton, England. Among their products were steam and petrol cars (as the Turner Motor Manufacturing Company), small boat engines, the Turner winch, a range of diesel engines made in the 1940s and 1950s, the Yeoman of England agricultural tractor, and truck transmissions - the latter leading to their eventual takeover.

== History ==
The origins of the Thomas Turner company date back to the middle of the 19th century. Thomas Turner had an interest in security, and obtained a patent in 1857 for a burglar alarm system. The company operated out of the Phoenix Lock and Metal Works, Great Brickkiln Street, Wolverhampton, and in 1866 he had 70 employees. In the late 1890s the works also produced a range of Phoenix bicycles. In 1902 the company decided to move into car manufacture and struck a deal with Miesse of Belgium to make their steam cars under licence. The Turner Motor Manufacturing Company was formed at this time, but the interest in security systems continued under Thomas Turner & Co (Wolverhampton) Ltd, as revealed by its managing director, James Stone Blundell, patenting an improvement in locks in 1912. Petrol cars were added in 1908. Car production was interrupted during WW1 but resumed afterwards and continued until 1928. The business then worked on aircraft undercarriages and other general engineering including the production of machine tools such as lathes.

Reflecting the cessation of the motor car manufacturing business, the name was changed to the Turner Manufacturing Company in 1938.

During World War 2 the company manufactured aircraft components, machine tools, and winches, and after the war they manufactured their own range of diesel engines and a tractor.

Production of the diesel engines, tractors, and light delivery vehicles ceased in the late 50s.

In 1957 Turner secured a licence as UK manufacturer of pneumatic equipment under licence from Modernair Corporation of America - as part of this Turner created a subsidiary called Hydraulics and Pneumatics Ltd. In 1962 they secured a licence for the production of truck transmissions, axles, and torque converters from the Clark Equipment Company of Michigan, USA. Their main business became transmissions for trucks and for agricultural vehicles and JCBs.

In 1971 it was announced they would be marketing transmissions produced by the Spicer Transmissions Division of Dana Corporation, and that these were now going to be produced in the UK. This led to Dana Incorporated taking a share in the company in 1974, and eventually buying it out in 1978.

== Turner cars ==
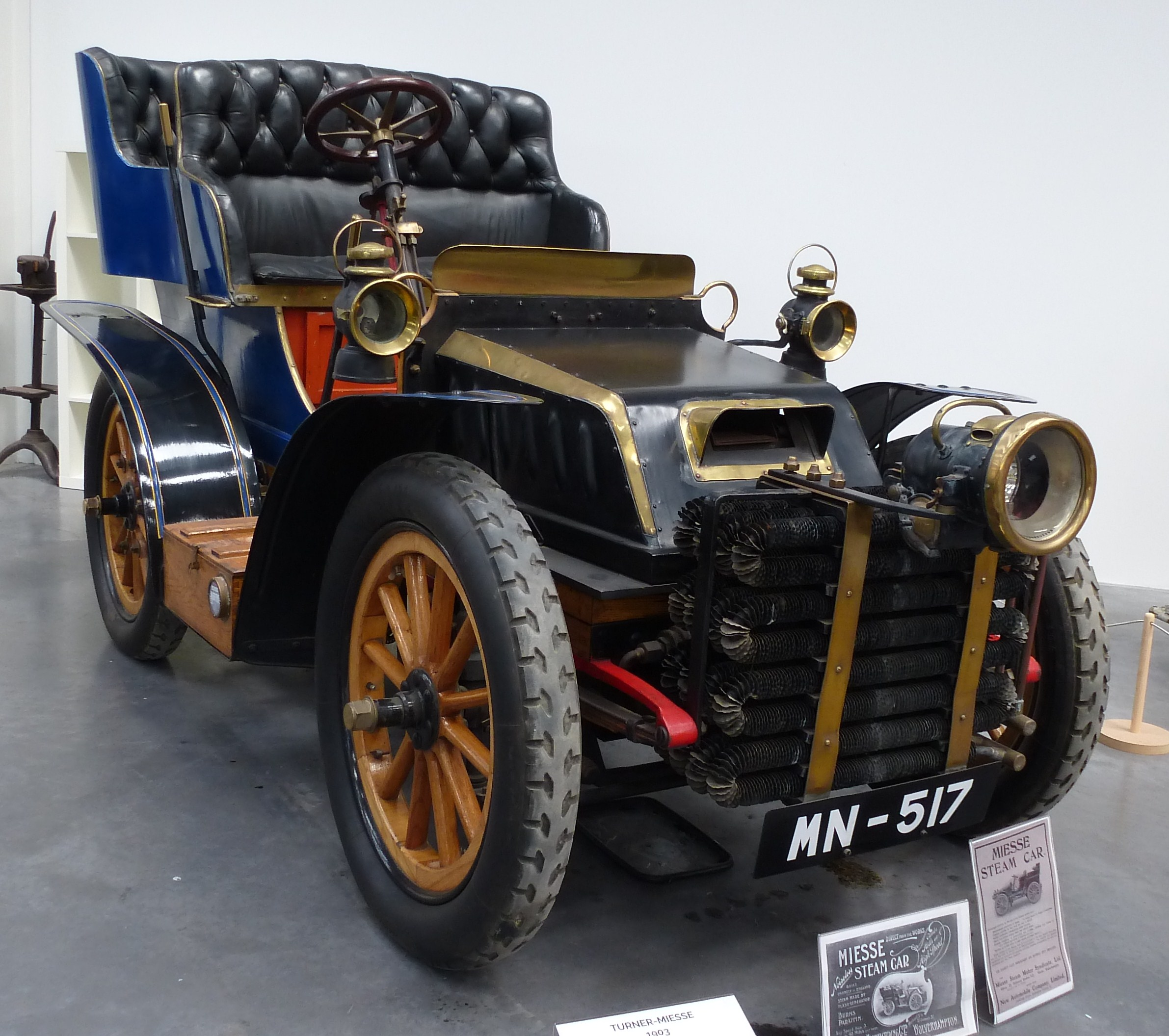
Turner-Miesse 1903 (2)

Turner produced cars between 1902 and 1928.

=== Steam cars ===
The Turner-Miesse steam car was produced under licence from the Miesse company of Belgium. The car had a three-cylinder, single acting steam engine, with steam provided by a paraffin-fired flash boiler of the Serpollet type. The steam boiler was under the bonnet, while the engine was under the seats. It was available with a 'tonneau' or 'landaulette' body.

A restored example of the steam car from 1904 is on display at the Black Country Living Museum in Dudley. Examination of this car during restoration found Belgian names on parts and metric threads, so it may be that much of the car was imported from Belgium and assembled in the UK.

The production of the Turner-Miesse steam cars stopped in 1906, as the deal with Miesse was terminated. From then until 1913 Turner produced their own steam cars of different design.

=== Petrol cars ===
The first petrol car to be produced by Turner's had a 9 hp air-cooled V twin engine and was exhibited at the 1908 motor show at Olympia. More models were soon added to the range, with a 10 hp four cylinder water-cooled car in 1909. The four cylinder car engine had overhead inlet valves and side-valve exhaust - a layout favoured later by Rover.

In 1914 they made a few cars under the 'Universal' brand name, but the war stopped production. After the war they went into a car building venture with Varley Woods which was unsuccessful. After this set-back they did not resume production of their own cars until 1923. These later cars used either a Dorman engine or a Meadows engine, but they did not sell in large numbers and car production ceased as a result in 1928.

== Turner-Bray ==
In April 1930 two Turner employees James Burns Blundell and Phillip Burns Blundell (former MD was James Stone Blundell (1842-1926)), registered a patent for a new clutch for outboard motors. Shortly afterwards Turner entered into an arrangement with Arthur Bray Ltd, Baker Street, London regarding the manufacture of small boat engines under the "Turner-Bray" name. Also marketed by Arthur Bray was the Turner-Bray Tadpole - an 11-foot mahogany-planked boat complete with a Turner-Bray inboard engine available "over the counter" for 50 guineas.

There were three models of Turner-Bray engine :

- The Sea Prince - an outboard with shallow prop for side or transom mounting (a 'de-luxe' version was offered for the amusement park trade with heavier clutch)
- The Sea Princess - an inboard engine
- The Sea Nymph - a conventional vertical outboard available with or without a clutch

The Sea Prince and Sea Princess used the same 83cc two-stroke power unit, and the Sea Nymph used a slightly larger bore 90.3cc unit. Ignition was provided by a Villiers Flywheel-magneto.

== Turner diesels ==
The details of the origins of the Turner diesel are unclear, and the adoption of a 68 degree angle between the cylinders in the V-twin and V4 engines is unusual. A range of diesel engines was advertised by their agents from August 1946, and they were advertised in India by September 1946, where they were being assembled by the Malik Diesel Engine (Turner) Mfg Co. They were described as having a "Robson" patent cylinder head. The relevant patent is that by James Malcolm Robson and Turner Manufacturing Co Ltd in 1944.

The engines came in single cylinder (1V95), V twin (2V95) and V4 (4V95) layouts, rated from 4 to 16HP. Marine versions were also available. While most of these engines were used as stationary (or marine) engines, the 4V95 was used in Turner's Yeoman of England tractor (see below) and the 2V95 was used from 1950 in the Hibberd "Planet" light tractor.

The next range of engines produced were 2-stroke diesels, the 40HP twin-cylinder L40 and the 60HP three-cylinder L60. These were based on the design of Dr Hans List of the Jenbach Company, Austria. With extensive use of aluminium these engines were relatively lightweight (compared to most diesels of that era). Conversion kits were offered for Land Rovers which at that time (1954-1956) were only offered with petrol engines, kits were also offered for Austin A70, Bedford 25cwt, Austin 25cwt and Austin taxi. As a publicity exercise in 1954 a long wheelbase Land Rover (registration NUK952) fitted with a Turner L60 diesel engine was driven from Wolverhampton across the Sahara to Nairobi. Turner published a booklet called "Operation Enterprise" to publicise the expedition.

== Yeoman of England Tractor ==
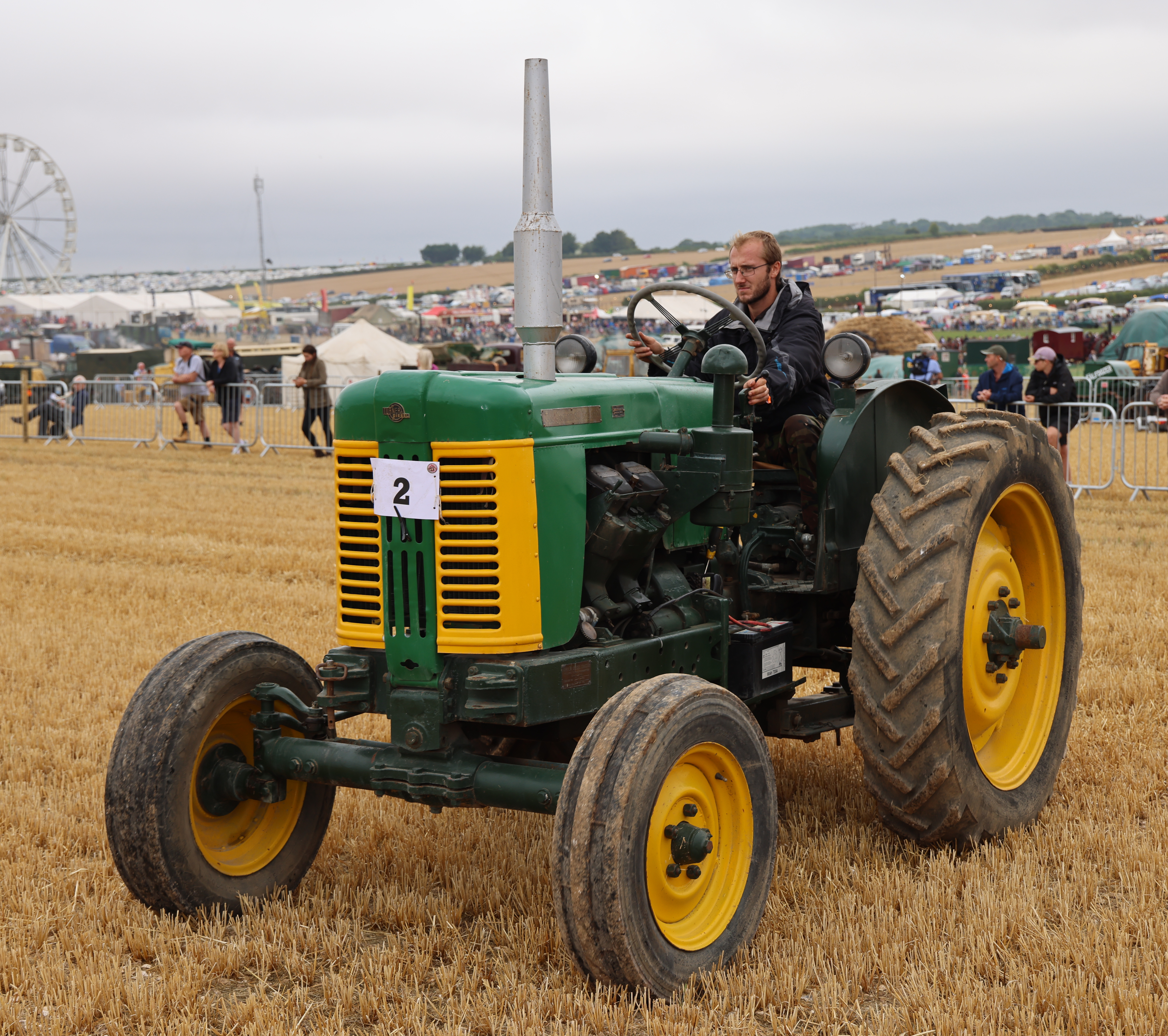
1950 Turner Yeoman MK II tractor

The Turner 4V95 engine started production in 1948, and Turner decided to build it into an agricultural tractor. Some re-rating of the engine was required and this had input from Freeman Sanders, who had previously worked for John Fowler & Co. and was responsible for the design of the Fowler-Sanders diesel engine (launched in 1939). This resulted in the Mk 2 version of the 4V95, which powered the Yeoman of England tractor when it was launched in 1949. There were some teething problems with the tractor after it went into production and this resulted in a further engine revision. These reliability issues, and the high price, resulted in production of only 2100 tractors by the time production ended in 1956.

== Light delivery vehicles ==
In 1949 Turner launched two lightweight delivery vehicles, the By-van and the Tri-van. These had a resemblance to motorcycles, and had a Turner Tiger 148cc (later enlarged to 168cc) air-cooled two-stroke engine mounted above and driving the single front wheel. The Tri-van had tricycle layout and was available with either an enclosed cargo hold with rear door, or with a pick-up body with open top. There was also a Rickshaw version of the Tri-van known as the Rixi which could carry two adults (with luggage space under their seat). This business was run under a subsidiary company called Light Delivery Vehicles Limited.

A prototoype of the vehicles was demonstrated in Belgium in 1946, this using a Royal Enfield Flea engine. As a demonstration of the production vehicles a By-van, a Tri-van and a Rixi ran from Wolverhampton to Land's End, then via Wolverhampton to John O'Groats, and back. The By-van carried 1cwt, the Tri-van 2cwt, and the Rixi carried a passenger and 50 lb (23 kg) of luggage. The journey was completed successfully and took a week.

Production was short-lived as in December 1951 it was reported that production had been 'curtailed' due to pressure of other work, and that Turner were in negotiations to sell the light delivery vehicle business.

== Turner winch ==
The Turner winch was developed following a request from Guy Motors in 1927 - who were based close to Turner's. The design was successful and led to further orders from the War Department for installation in six-wheeled Leyland Terrier trucks. The winch was in demand during the war, and production continued into the 1960s. Bedford military trucks in particular were fitted with Turner winches during and after the war. The biggest winches they produced were 20 ton winches for the Mk3 Thornycroft Antar and the Leyland Martian recovery vehicles. The smaller end of the range were an optional fitment to Austin Gipsy and Land Rover vehicles.
