= Bignan (automobile) =

Établissements Industriels J. Bignan
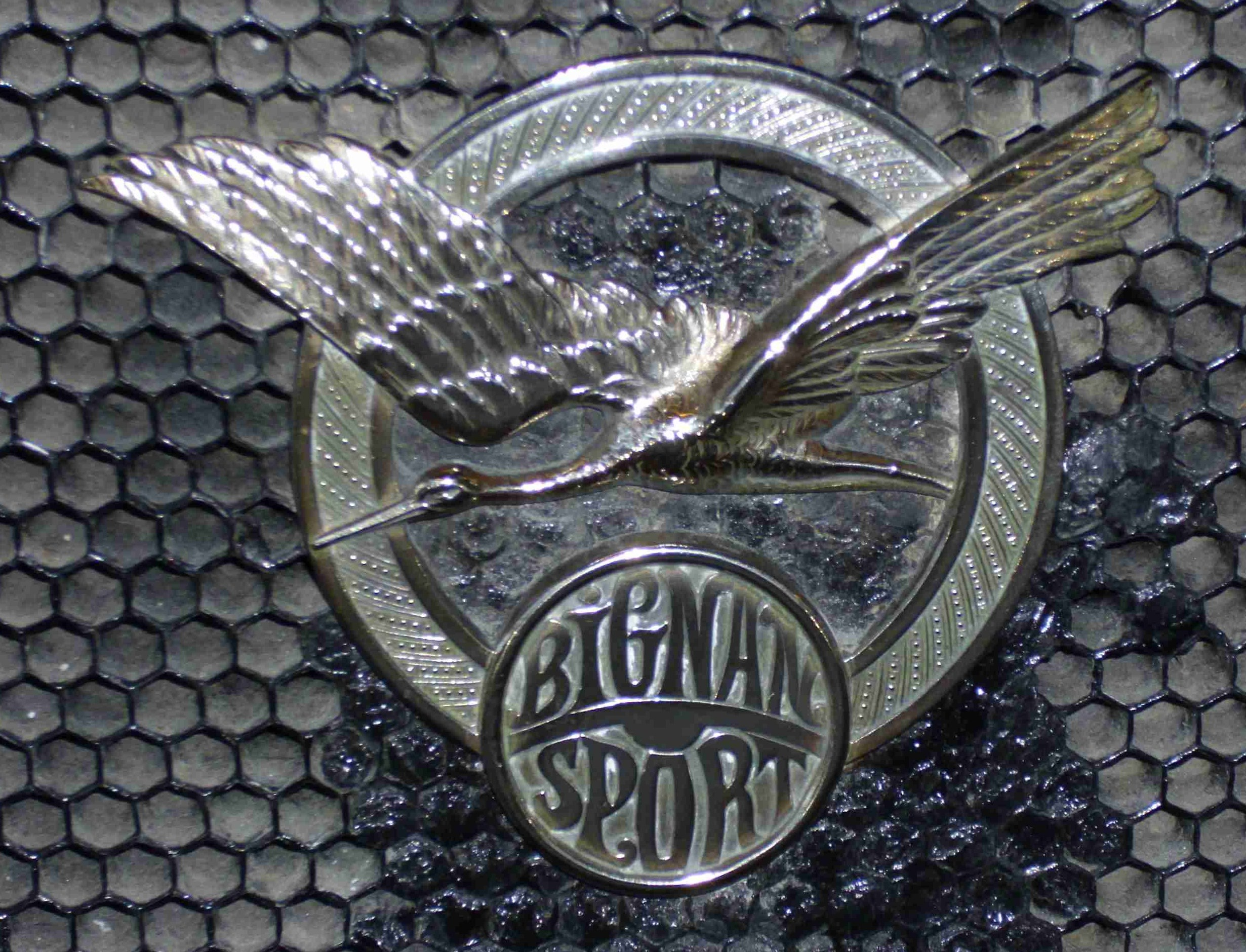
- Founded: 1918
- Founder: Jacques Bignan
- Defunct: 1931
- Headquarters: Courbevoie, Paris (France)
- Products: Cars

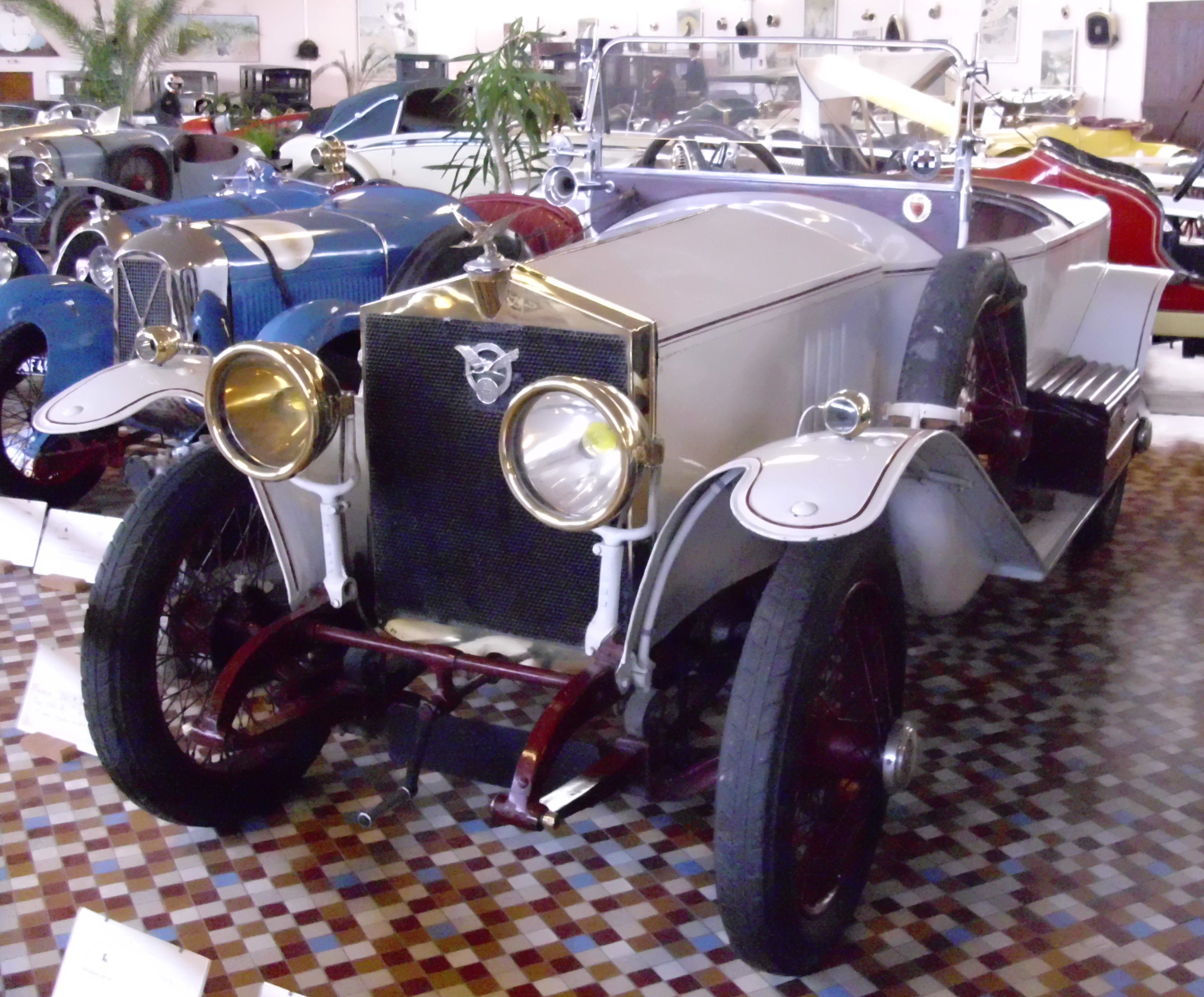
Bignan (1919)

The Bignan was a French automobile manufactured between 1918 and 1931 on the north side of central Paris, in Courbevoie. The business was created, and till the mid-1920s, headed-up by Jacques Bignan.

== History ==
Jacques Bignan produced bespoke engines before the First World War, but only after the cessation of hostilities did he register, in 1918, the company Établissements Industriels J. Bignan, and emerged as an automobile manufacturer on his own account, taking stand number 84 at the Motor Show in October 1919.

The first Bignan was powered by a 2,940 cc (25 CV/HP) four-cylinder engine and sat on a 2,860 mm (112.6 in) wheelbase. At the end of 1919, the manufacturer was quoting a list price for the car of 30,000 francs in bare chassis form. Tires were not included in the price, which was at this time not unusual. The manufacturer was also listing a price of 38,500 francs for a "torpedo-bodied" car. The majority of the vehicles produced had tourer bodies. Several of these cars were used as official vehicles for the 1920 Tour de France.

Two new models were launched in 1922 - the 11CV, with a 2-litre engine, and a badge-engineered version of the Salmson AL3, a one-litre four-cylinder powered sports car. The 11CV had a four-speed gearbox and servo-assisted brakes. The production model developed 50 bhp, but the competition version developed 70 bhp, due to the use of desmodromic valves. Only two of these competition models were built, but they were considered fast and reliable. The best competition result was a class victory at Spa-Francorchamps. The 11CV was redesigned in 1926, with an eight-valve engine featuring twin oil pumps, giving 60 bhp.

The company collapsed in 1926, and were taken over by the Société La Cigogne, after which Jacques Bignan had to leave the company. Several owners in succession now acquired and tried to preserve the company, which by 1928 was in the hands of Mécanique-Outillage-Pièces détachés (MOP), presumably primarily a tools/auto-parts business. Two cars, now listed with the name "MOP-Bignan", were still being promoted at the Paris Motor Show in October 1928. These were the 2-litre "11CV" model and a "14CV" overhead valve S.C.A.P. straight-8, 2.5-litre engined car, both of which continued in production until the company finally went out of business in 1931.

== Motorsport ==
Three Type B cars were entered in the 1920 GP de Voiturettes at Le Mans, with the cars of Nogue and Delauney finishing second and third behind a Bugatti Type 13.

By 1923 the 2-litre 11CV had become a mainstay of the range, and it was a Bignan powered by one of these engines that achieved a podium finish, coming in third overall, at the first Le Mans 24 Hour race. Although they never did so well again, Bignan returned to Le Mans in 1924 and in 1925, when a Bignan finished in twelfth place. One of these engines also powered a Bignan to victory in the 1924 Monte Carlo Rally. A feature of the engine with which other auto-makers only caught up many decades later was the incorporation, on the "competition" version, of four valves per cylinder. Appropriately, the company's slogan at the motor show in October 1924 was "Toujours en avant du progres" ("Always ahead of progress").

A 11CV saloon driven by Jacques Édouard Ledure won the 1924 Monte Carlo Rally.
