= Francorchamps =

Village in Wallonia, Belgium

Coordinates: 50.4536°N 5.9519°E

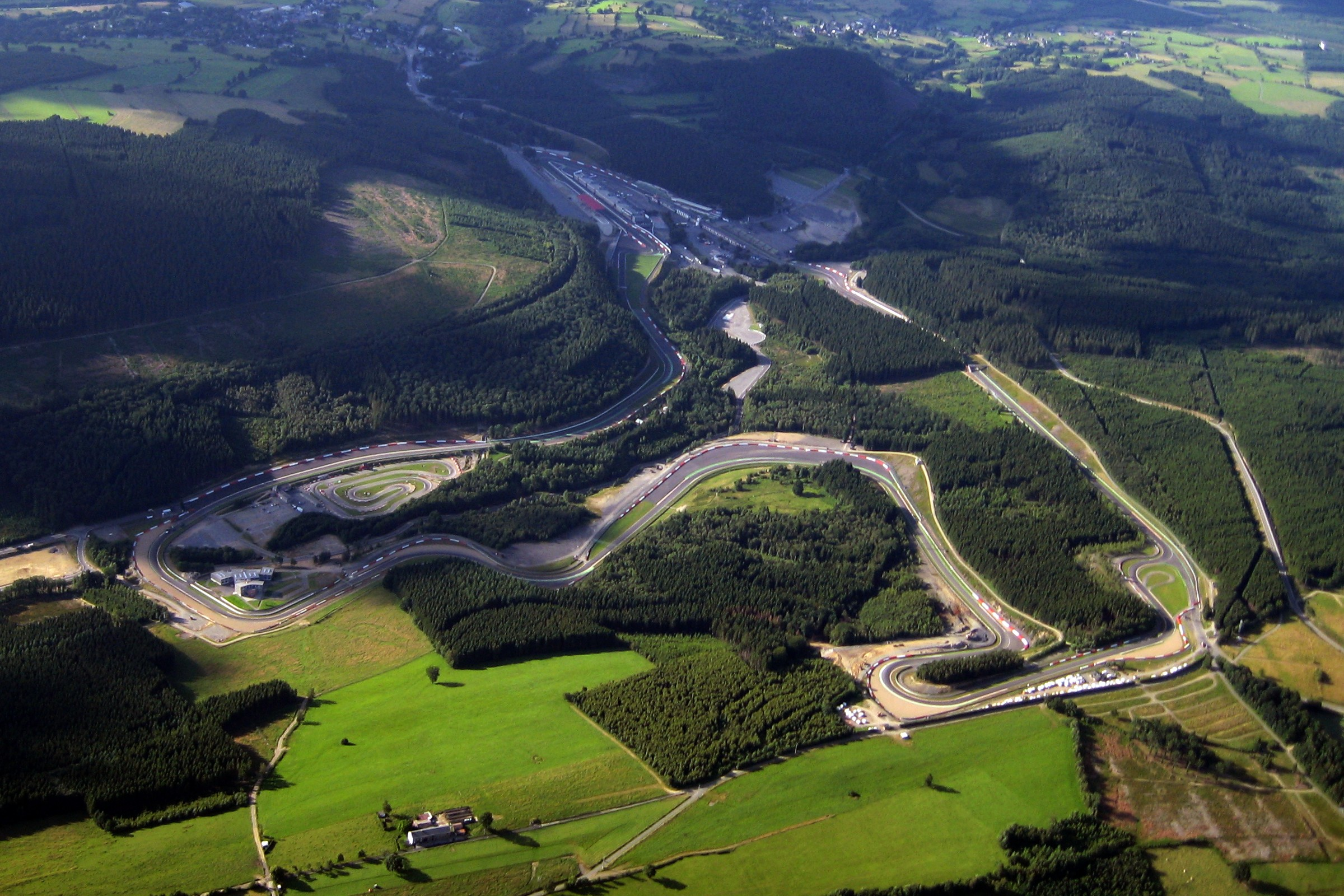
Overview of Spa-Francorchamps circuit

Francorchamps (French pronunciation: [fʁɑ̃kɔʁʃɑ̃], Walloon: Francortchamp) is a village of Wallonia and a district of the municipality of Stavelot, located in the province of Liège, Belgium.

It is home to the motor-racing Circuit de Spa-Francorchamps. A ski resort, the Mont des Brumes, is located nearby.
