= Flying Spur =

Flying Spur may refer to:

== Automobiles ==
- Bentley S2 Continental Flying Spur (1959–1962)
- Bentley S3 Continental Flying Spur (1962–1965)
- Bentley Flying Spur (2005) (2005–present)

== Other uses ==
- Flying Spur (horse), a racehorse
- Flying spur (clipper), a tea clipper
