= Bentley S1 =

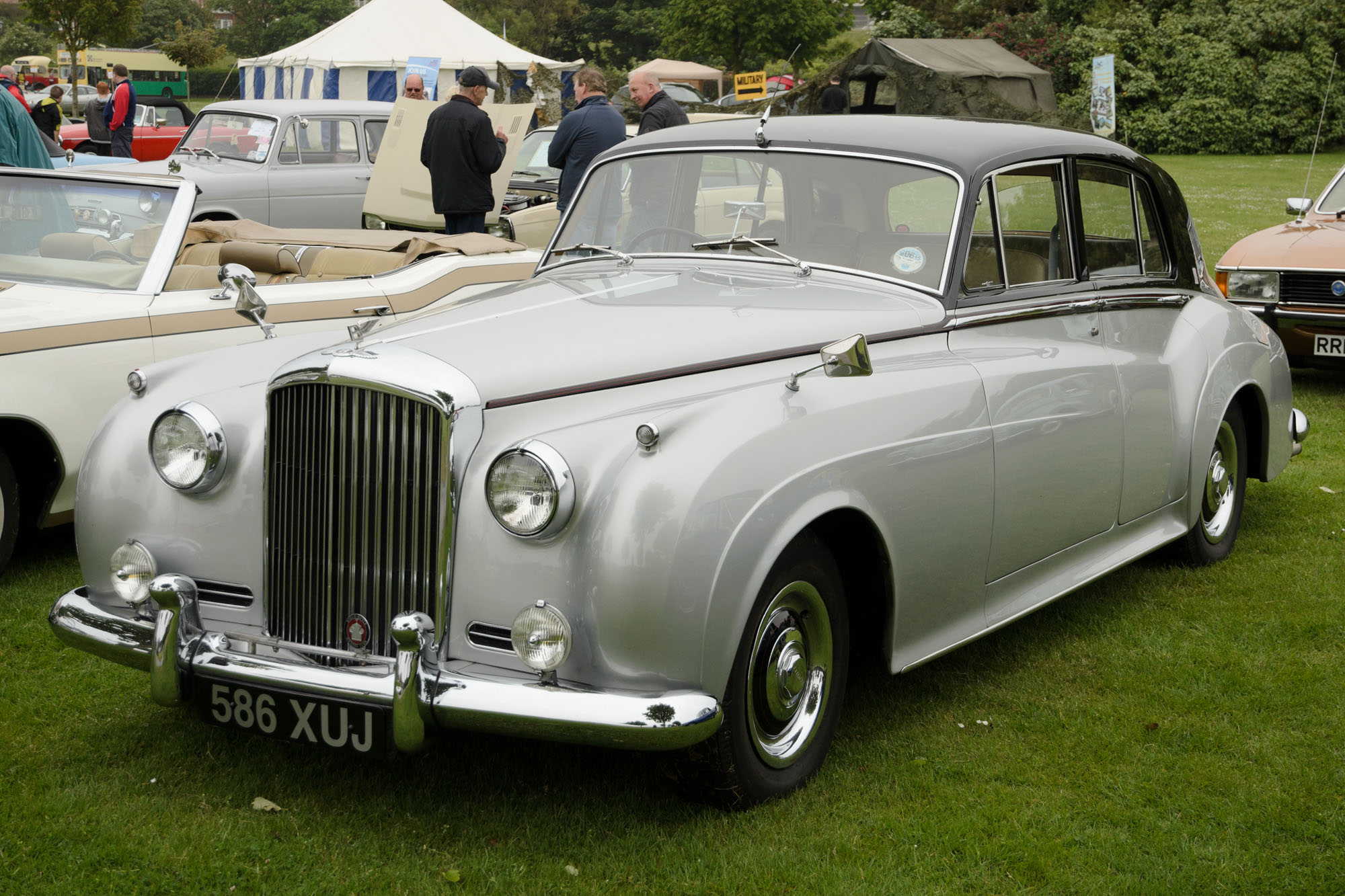

Overview
- Manufacturer: Bentley Motors Limited (1931)
- Production: 1955–1959; 3,538 produced
- Assembly: United Kingdom: Crewe (Bentley Crewe)

Body and chassis
- Class: Full-size luxury car
- Body style: 4-door saloon; 2-door coupé
- Layout: FR layout
- Platform: separate chassis
- Related: Bentley S1 Continental; Rolls-Royce Silver Cloud

Powertrain
- Engine: 4.9 L I6
- Transmission: 4-speed automatic

Dimensions
- Wheelbase: 123 in (3,124 mm); 127 in (3,226 mm)
- Length: 211.75 in (5,378 mm)
- Width: 1,898.65 mm (74 3/4 in)
- Height: 1,631.95 mm (64 1/4 in)
- Kerb weight: 1,924 kg (4,242 lb)

Chronology
- Predecessor: R Type
- Successor: S2

The Bentley S1 (originally simply "Bentley S") was a luxury car produced by Bentley Motors Limited from 1955 until 1959. The S1 was derived from Rolls-Royce's complete redesign of its standard production car after World War II, the Silver Cloud. Each was its maker's last standard production car with an independent chassis. The S-series Bentley was given the Rolls-Royce - Bentley L Series V8 engine in late 1959 and named the S2. Twin headlamps and a facelift to the front arrived in late 1962, resulting in the S3. In late 1965, the S3 was replaced by the new unitary construction Rolls-Royce Silver Shadow-derived T series.

== Bentley standard steel saloon ==
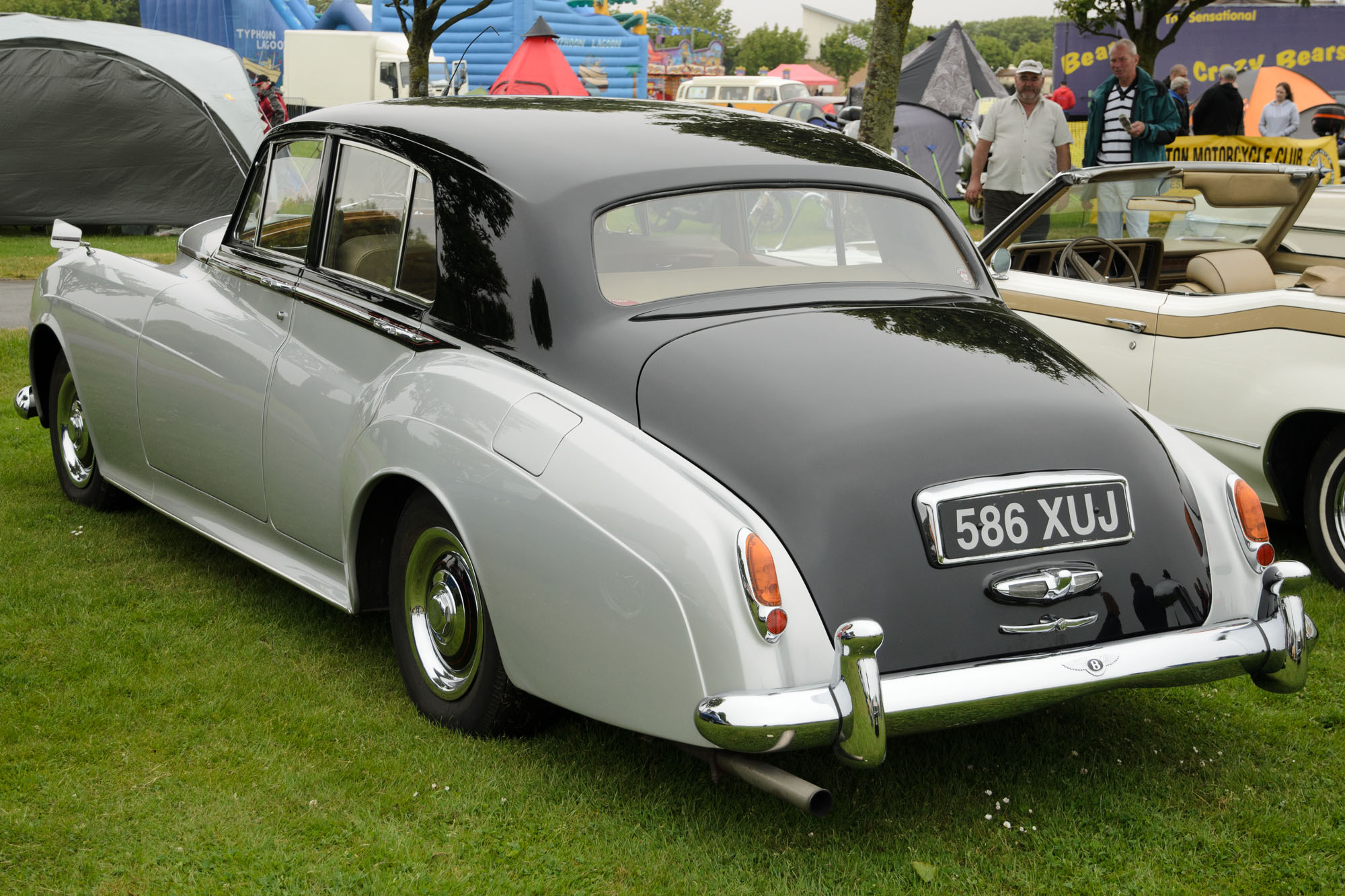
1958 Bentley S1 (rear view)

The car was announced at the end of April 1955, and it was noted that the existing Continental model would continue. The new standard steel saloon replaced the R type standard steel saloon which had been in production, with modifications, since 1946. It was a more generously sized five- or six-seater saloon, with the body manufactured in pressed steel with stressed skin construction. Doors, bonnet [hood] and luggage locker lid [trunk lid] were of aluminium.

Having a totally new external appearance, although with the traditional radiator grille, the main differences from the R type were:

- three inches longer wheelbase
- lower build without reducing headroom and with an enlarged luggage boot [trunk]
- softer suspension with electrically operated control of rear dampers
- lighter steering and improved braking
- engine capacity increased to 4887cc, the same size as used in the Bentley Continental
- four-speed automatic gearbox was standard, with ability to select individual ratios if desired.

== Standard and long wheelbase saloon and chassis ==
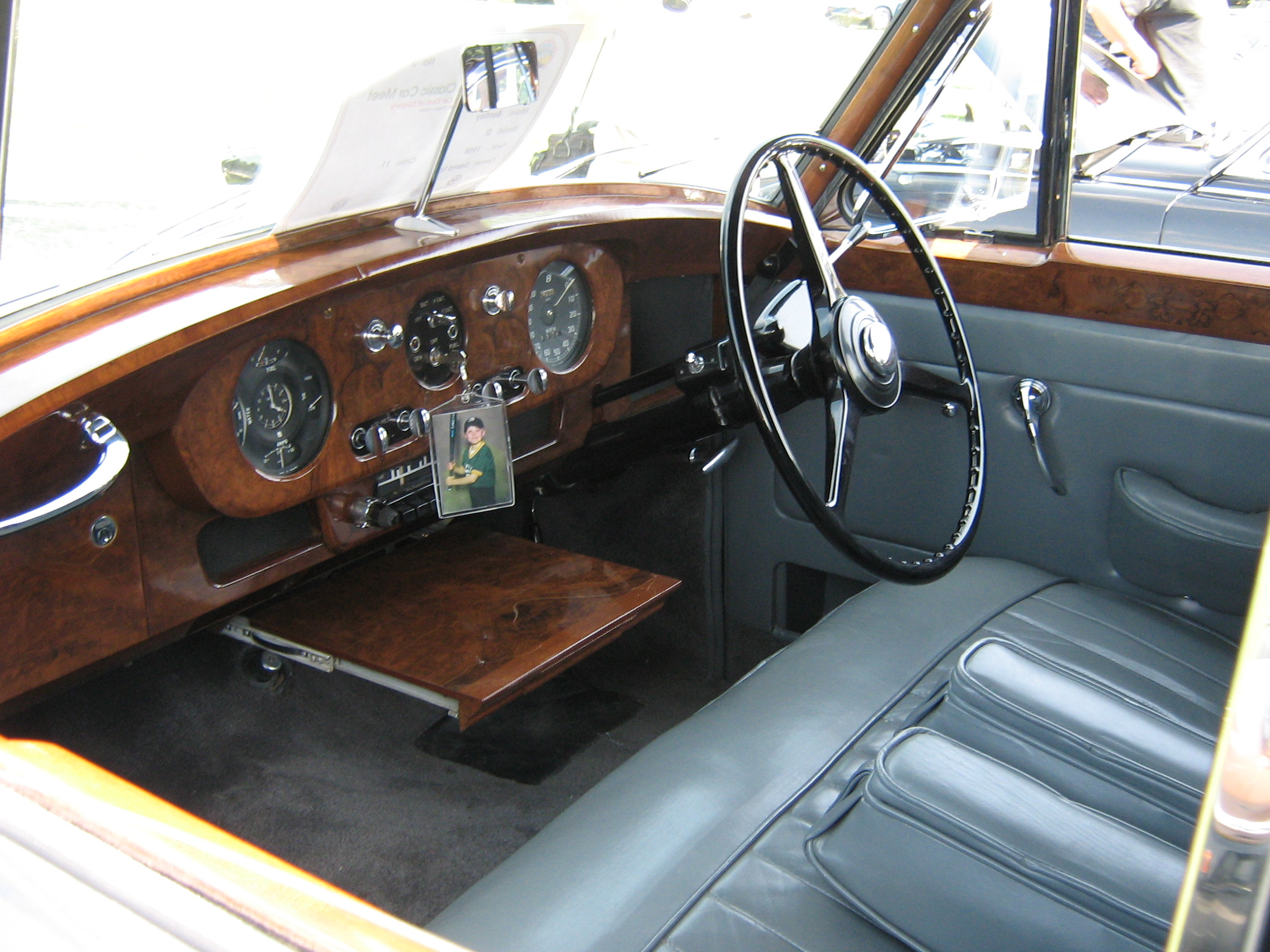
1959 Bentley S1 interior

As with the preceding Mark VI and R type Bentleys, there was almost no difference between standard Bentley and Rolls-Royce models; this Bentley S differing only in its radiator grille shape and badging from the Rolls-Royce Silver Cloud I.

The models shared the 4.9 L (4887 cc/298 in^{3}) straight-6 engine. They were the last vehicles to be powered by descendants of the engine originally used in the Rolls-Royce Twenty from 1922 to 1929. The bore was 95.25 mm (3.750 in), stroke was 114.3 mm (4.50 in) and compression ratio 6.6:1. Twin SU carburetors were fitted, with upgraded models from 1957. A 4-speed automatic transmission was standard.

Two wheelbases were produced: 123 inches (3,100 mm) and, from 1957, 127 inches (3,200 mm).

A standard-wheelbase car tested by the British magazine The Motor in 1957 had a top speed of 103 mph (166 km/h) and could accelerate from 0–60 mph (0–97 km/h) in 13.1 seconds. A fuel consumption of 16.1 miles per imperial gallon (17.5 L/100 km; 13.4 mpg_{‑US}) was recorded. The test car, which had the optional power steering, cost £6305 including taxes of £1803.

=== Production ===
- S: 3,072 (145 with coachbuilt bodies)
- S long wheelbase: 35 (12 with coachbuilt bodies)

== S Continental ==
Bentley S Continental
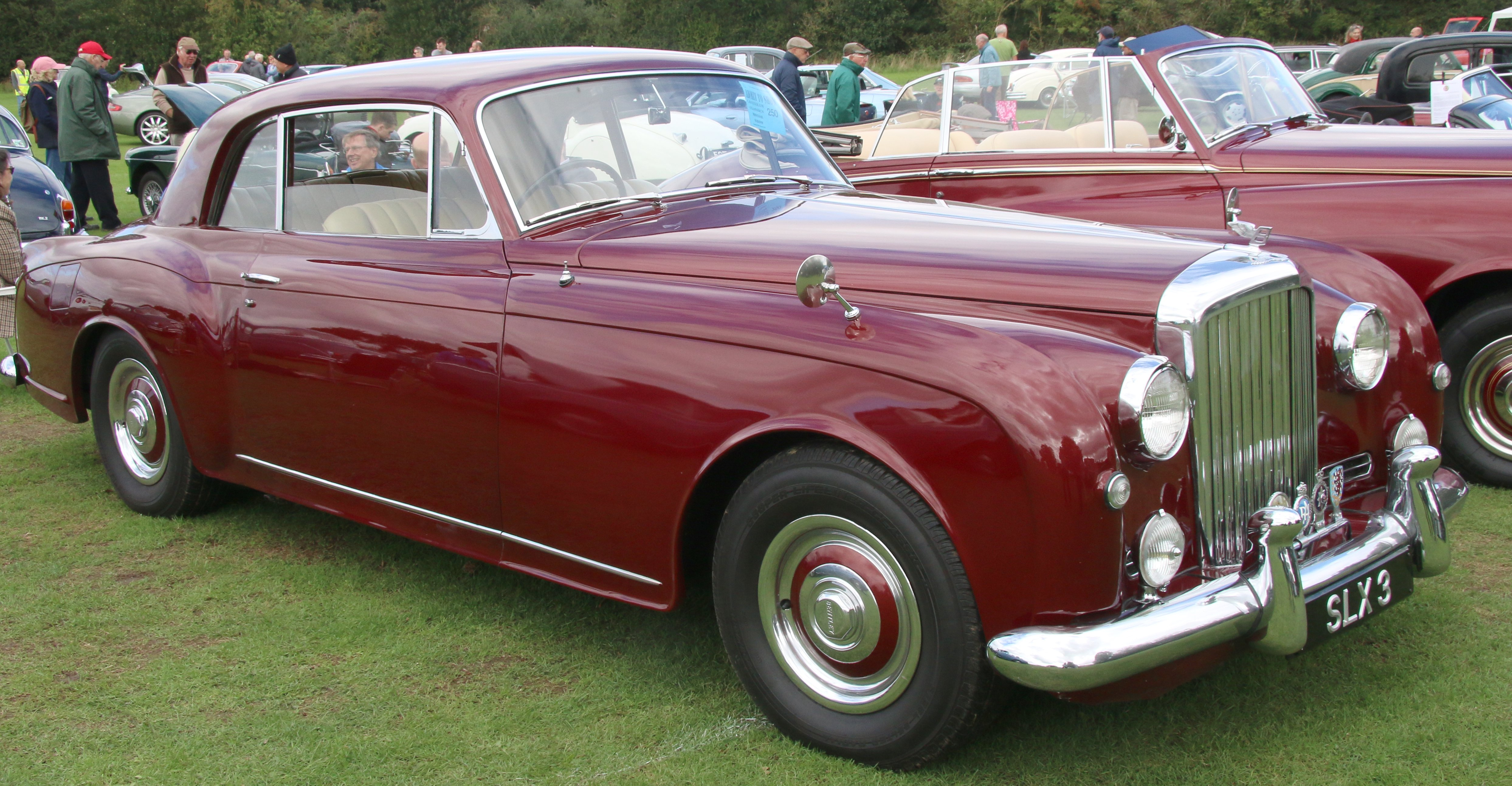
- Park Ward Continental Fixed-Head Coupé

Overview
- Manufacturer: Bentley Motors Limited (1931)
- Assembly: United Kingdom: Crewe (Bentley Crewe: chassi); United Kingdom: London (Park Ward: body)

Body and chassis
- Class: Full-size luxury car
- Body style: 4-seater, 2-door fixed-head coupé; drophead coupé
- Layout: FR layout
- Platform: separate chassis
- Related: Rolls-Royce Silver Cloud

Powertrain
- Engine: 4.9 L I6
- Transmission: 4-speed automatic

Dimensions
- Wheelbase: 123 in (3,100 mm); 3,225.8 mm (127.00 in)
- Length: 210.5 in (5,350 mm)
- Width: 72.00 in (1,828.8 mm)
- Height: 62 1/2 in (1,587.5 mm)
- Kerb weight: 3,976 lb (1,803.5 kg)

A high-performance version S Continental (chassis only) was introduced six months after the introduction of the S1. Lighter weight fixed-head and drophead coupé bodies were provided to special order (for a premium of about 50%) by H. J. Mulliner & Co., Park Ward, James Young and Freestone & Webb. A pre-production 2-seater fixed-head coupé on the new chassis was designed and built for the Bentley factory by Pininfarina.

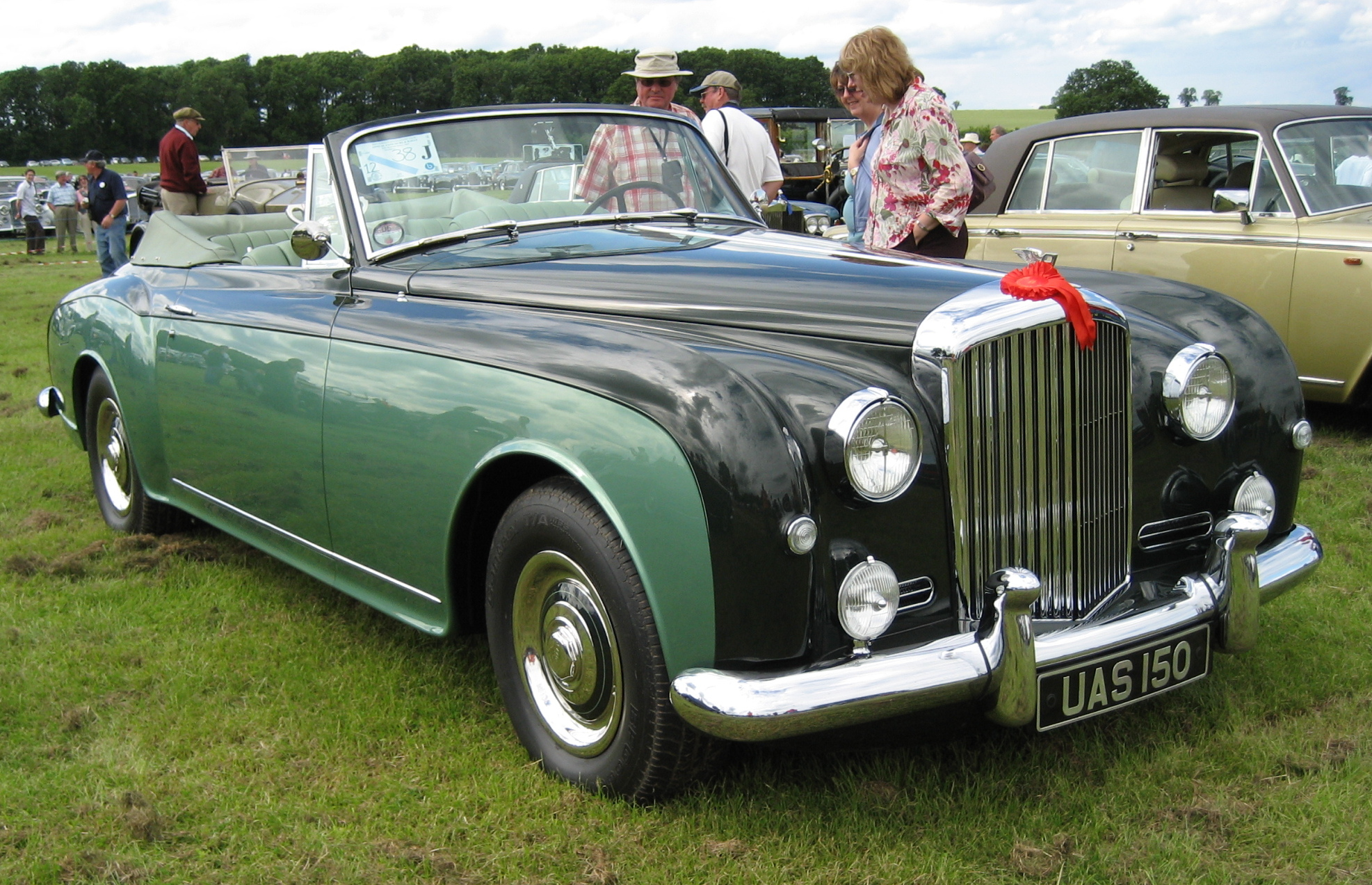
Park Ward drophead coupé

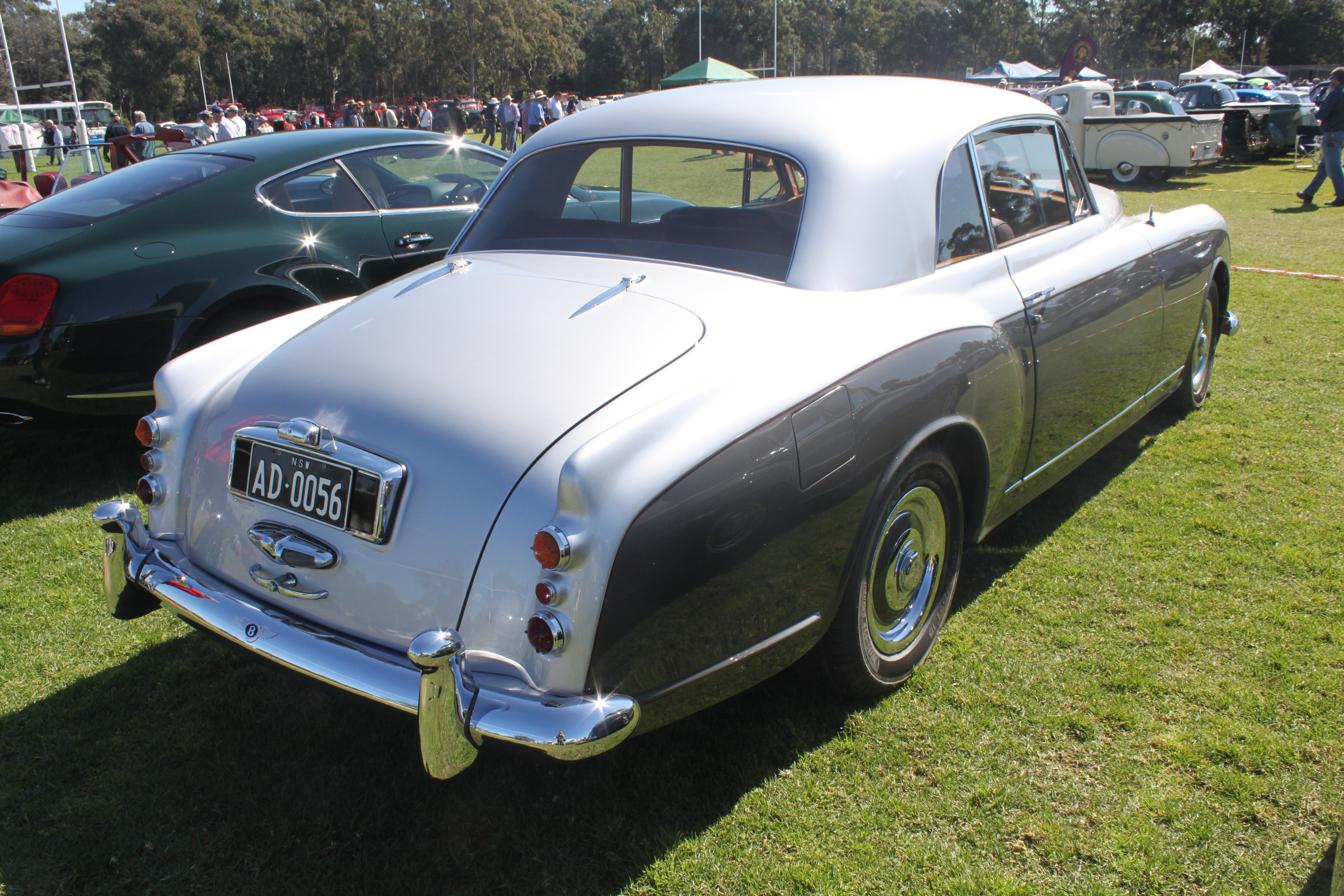
Park Ward fixed head coupé

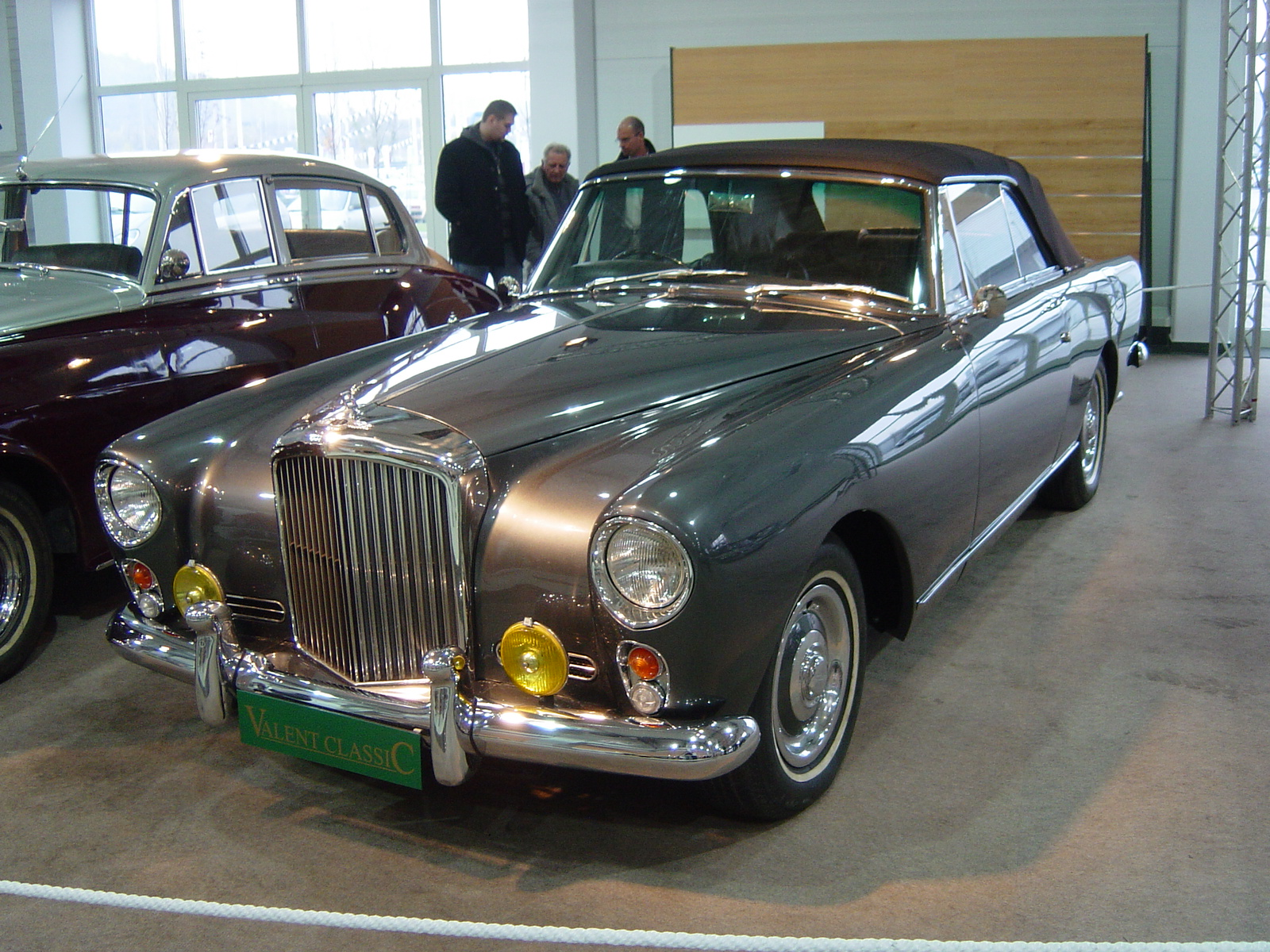
H. J. Mulliner drophead coupé

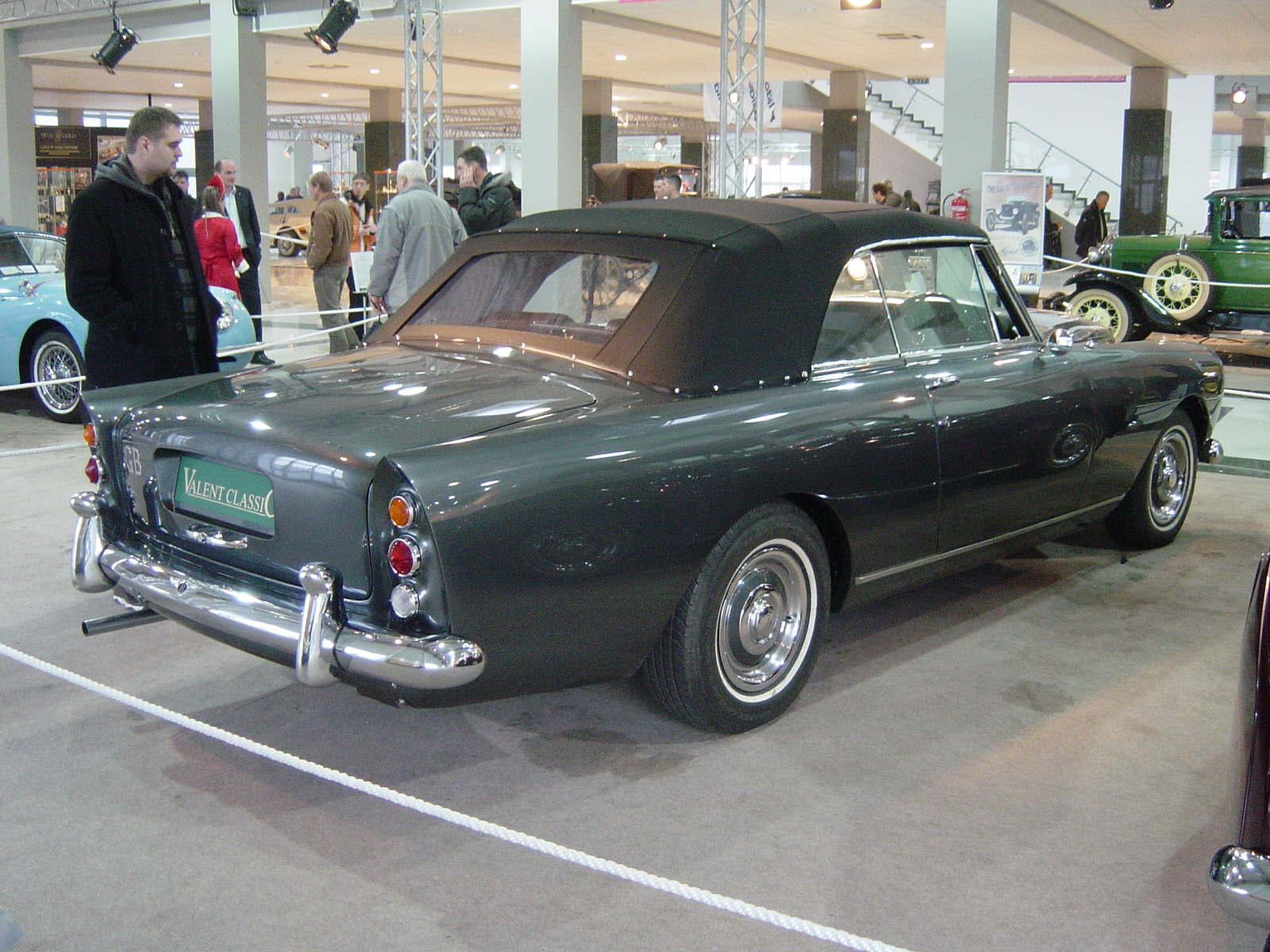
H. J. Mulliner drophead coupé (rear view)

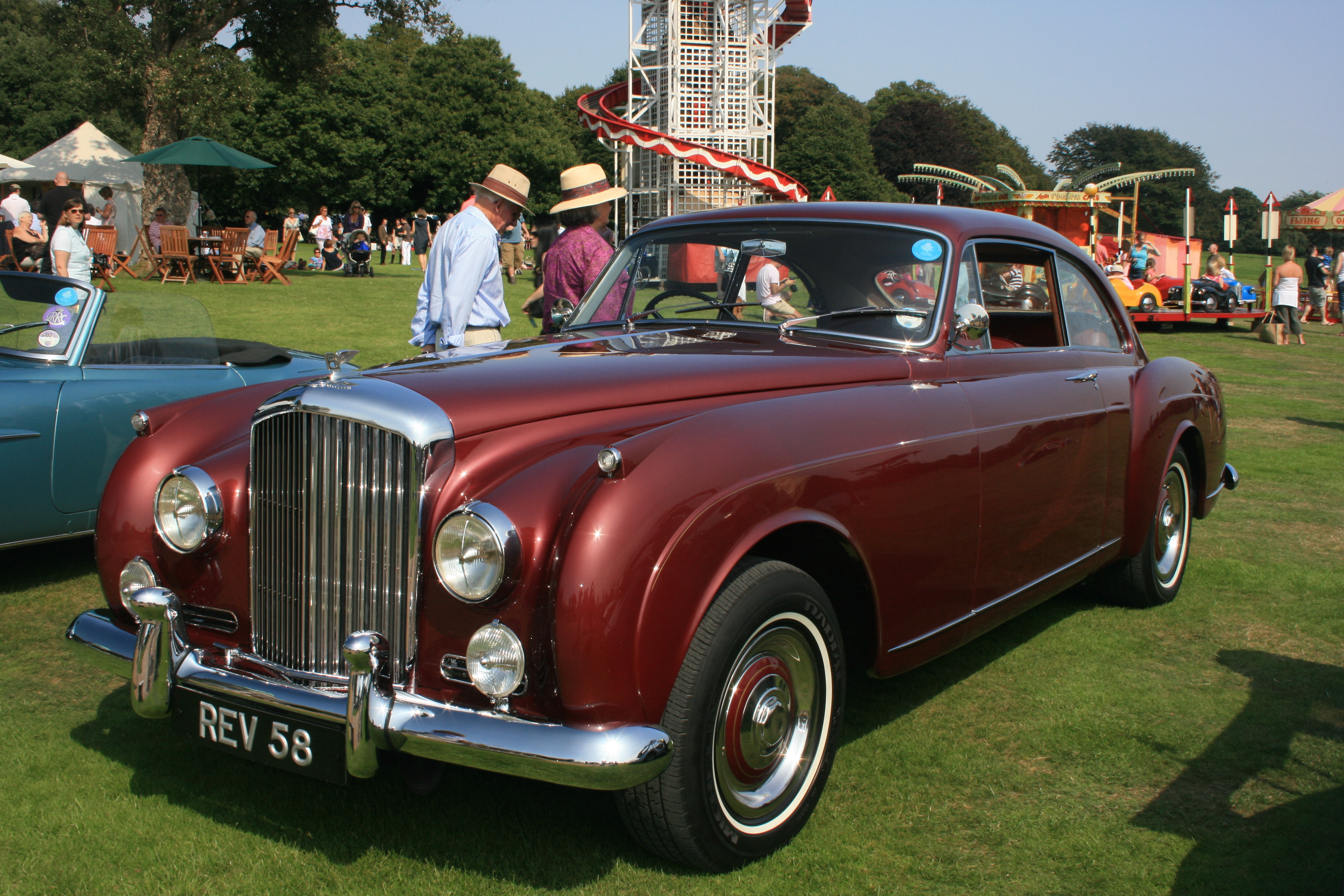
H. J. Mulliner fixed head coupé

=== Production ===
- S Continental: 431
