= Bentley T-series =

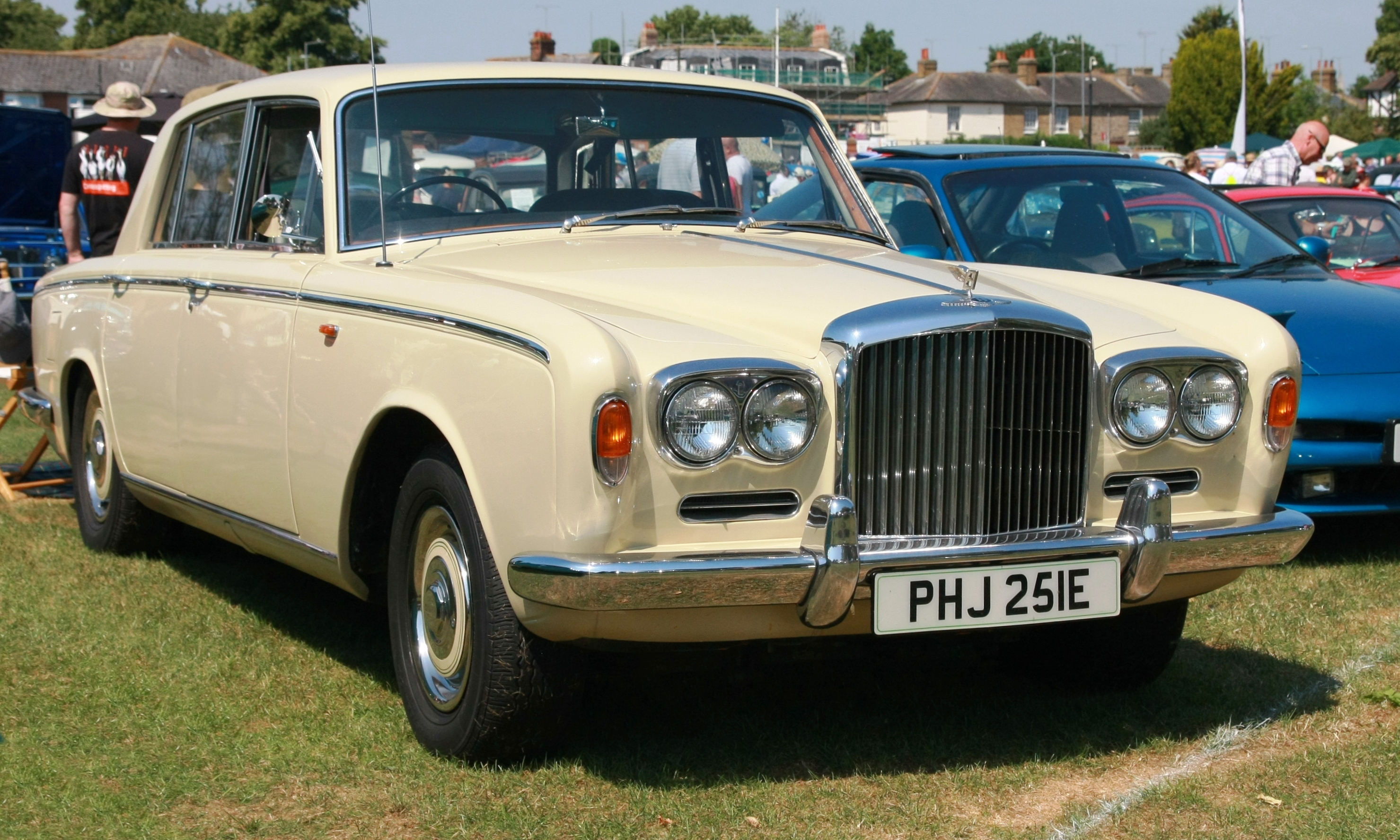
- 1967 Bentley T1 four-door saloon

Overview
- Manufacturer: Bentley Motors Limited (1931)
- Production: 1965–1980
- Assembly: United Kingdom: Crewe (Bentley Crewe)

Body and chassis
- Class: Full-size luxury car
- Body style: 4-door saloon 2-door saloon 2-door convertible
- Layout: FR layout
- Platform: monocoque
- Related: Rolls-Royce Silver Shadow; Rolls-Royce Camargue; Rolls-Royce Corniche/Bentley Continental

Powertrain
- Engine: 6230 cc L425 V8 (1965–1970); 6750 cc L410 V8 (1971–1980)
- Transmission: 4-speed automatic; 3-speed THM 400 automatic

Dimensions
- Wheelbase: 119.5 in (3,040 mm)
- Length: 203.5 in (5,170 mm)
- Width: 71 in (1,800 mm)
- Height: 59.75 in (1,518 mm)
- Kerb weight: 2,103 kg (4,636 lb)

Chronology
- Predecessor: Bentley S3
- Successor: Bentley Mulsanne

The Bentley T-series is a luxury automobile produced by Bentley Motors Limited in the United Kingdom from 1965 to 1980. It was announced and displayed for the first time at the Paris Motor Show on 5 October 1965 as a Bentley-badged version of the totally redesigned Rolls-Royce Silver Shadow.

The Bentley T series was available as a four-door saloon and as a long wheelbase four-door saloon. A small number of two-door saloons were built with coachwork by James Young and Mulliner Park Ward and a two-door convertible with coachwork by Mulliner Park Ward was introduced in September 1967. A total of 2,336 examples were produced.

== Design ==
The idea of mass-producing a smaller unibody Rolls-Royce model had been thought since the early-to-mid 1960s. During this time, Rolls-Royce entered into a collaborative venture with BMC, with a view to jointly producing a range of saloons and coupés. Rolls-Royce was thinking in terms of downsizing at this time, a reaction to the general down-turn in demand for their traditional coachbuilt models during the post-war years. As such, Rolls Royce and Bentley started designing a series of smaller unibody downsized luxury saloons with their intention of replacing the Rolls-Royce Silver Cloud and Bentley S1. The car would be the Rolls-Royce/Bentley Java and was derived from the unibody Princess 3-litre and used a 3909cc FB60 six-cylinder engine originally developed for the Bentley Burma saloon, which was built at the same time in 1961–1962. Essentially, the central bodyshell remained the same as the Princess but received Rolls Royce and Bentley style front and rear ends. Later, the whole body was completely revised and now resembled a smaller Bentley T-Series. In 1964, the Bentley Bengal/R-R Rangoon was also developed, essentially a similar vehicle based on the Austin 3-Litre. None entered production and all work was scrapped in 1964. It was the Bentley Burma from which the Silver Shadow/T-Series were closely derived from. The Bentley Burma originally derived from the Bentley Tibet concept car, a standard-sized full-size Bentley car, albeit still unibody developed since 1960. When it was decided to downsize the Rolls-Royce range, the Bentley Tibet bodyshell was shortened and put on a modified Bentley Java chassis and engine and was named the Bentley Burma. The 3909cc FB60 engine was however later abandoned for the 6230cc V8 that was currently in development. A Rolls-Royce version named the Tonga was also developed. Eventually, these projects were all cancelled and development was streamlined into one all-encompassing programme known as the SY. This car would eventually emerge as the Rolls-Royce Silver Shadow and Bentley T-Series. Later, a similar idea was used for the 1994 Bentley Java concept car.

The T series was the first unibodied Bentley, and was totally different from its predecessor the S series. It featured a new steel and aluminium monocoque body with subframes to mount the engine and suspension. While smaller overall, it had more passenger room, particularly in the rear compartment, yet more luggage space. Overall the car was 7 inches (18 cm) shorter, 5 inches (13 cm) lower, 3 1/2 inches (9 cm) narrower, and 150 pounds (68 kg) lighter than the S.

Because of being fitted with the traditional round-shouldered "Bentley" style front grille – its sole material styling difference from the Rolls-Royce Silver Shadow – it was also somewhat lower at bonnet height, giving it a slightly more assertive look.

The 'T' also featured independent suspension on all four wheels with automatic height control according to loading. Other major improvements included disc brakes on all wheels (with a triplicate hydraulic braking system patented from Citroën that also supplied pressure for the self leveling suspension); new and lighter power steering, improved automatic transmission, eight-way adjustable electric front seats, and a larger fuel tank.

The engine received a redesigned cylinder head that allowed a speed increase to 118 miles per hour (190 km/h).

In October 1966, the T saloon's pretax 'list price' of £5425 was £50 less than the Silver Shadow.

== Image ==
The formerly more sporting image of Bentley motor cars differing from Rolls-Royces was long gone and far from being renewed by the time the Bentley T was introduced. Effectively, the two were indistinguishable.

== Bentley T2 (1977–1980) ==
The T was upgraded to the "T2" in 1977, which featured rack and pinion steering, improved air conditioning, rubber-faced bumpers, a new fascia and, for non-federalized cars, a front air dam. Bosch CIS Fuel Injection was introduced for late 1979 and 1980 models for the US and other markets, similarly to the Rolls-Royce Silver Shadow II.

The T2 was discontinued in 1980.

== Production numbers ==
Model	Period	Units
Bentley T1	1965–1977	1703
Bentley T1 LWB	1971–1976	9
Bentley T1 two door saloon	1966–1971	114 *
Bentley T1 Pininfarina coupé	1968	1
Bentley T1 convertible	1967–1971	41
Bentley T2	1977–1980	558
Bentley T2 LWB	1977–1980	10

Note: 15 of the two-door Saloons were built with coachwork by James Young, the remainder by Mulliner Park Ward.

== Gallery ==
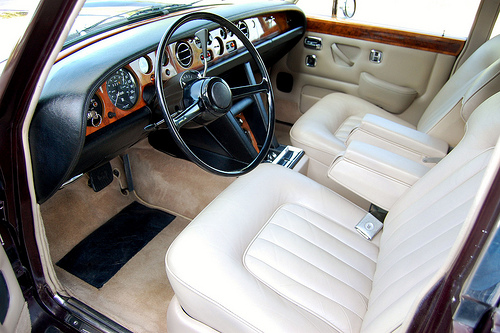
T1 interior

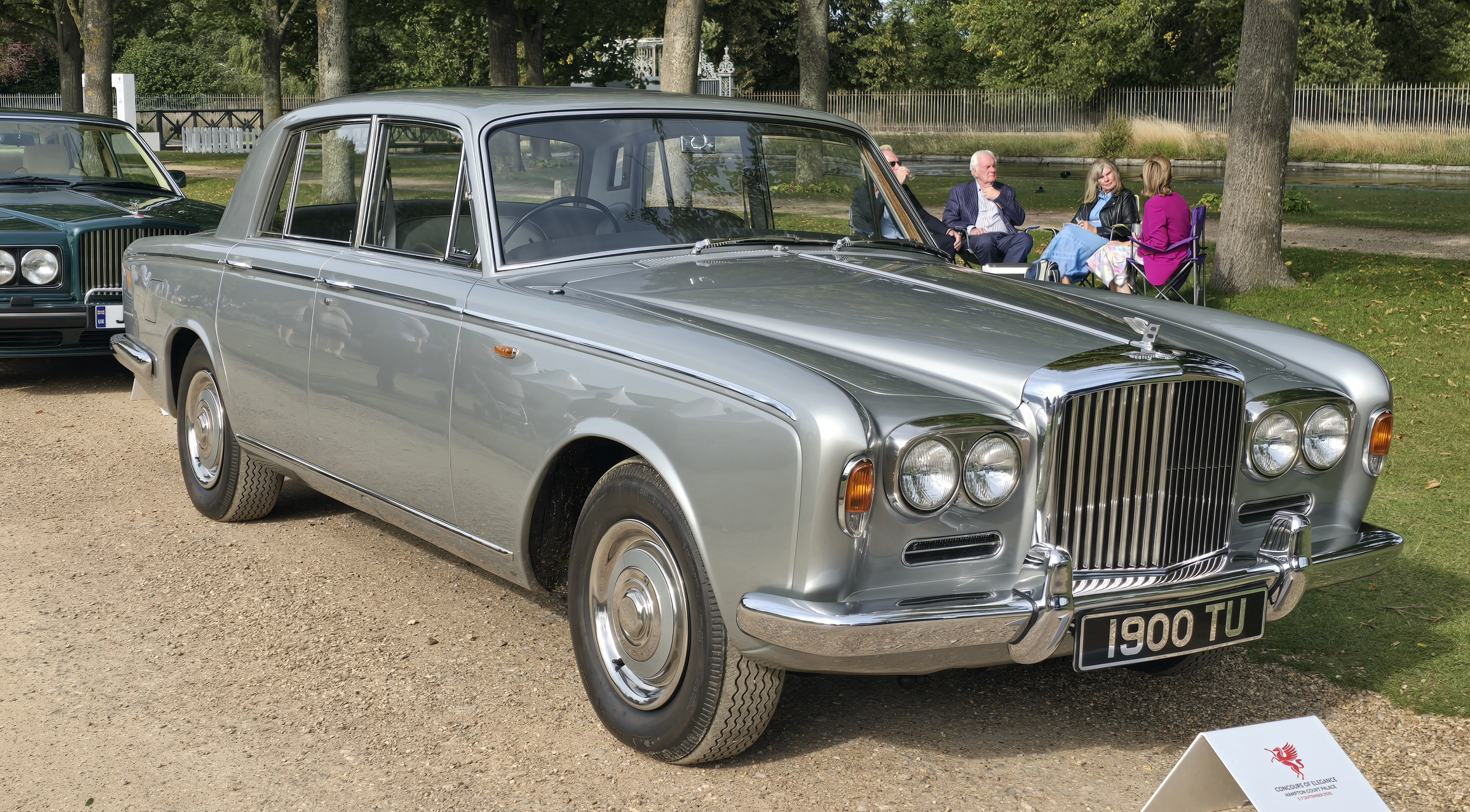
1965 T1 four-door saloon

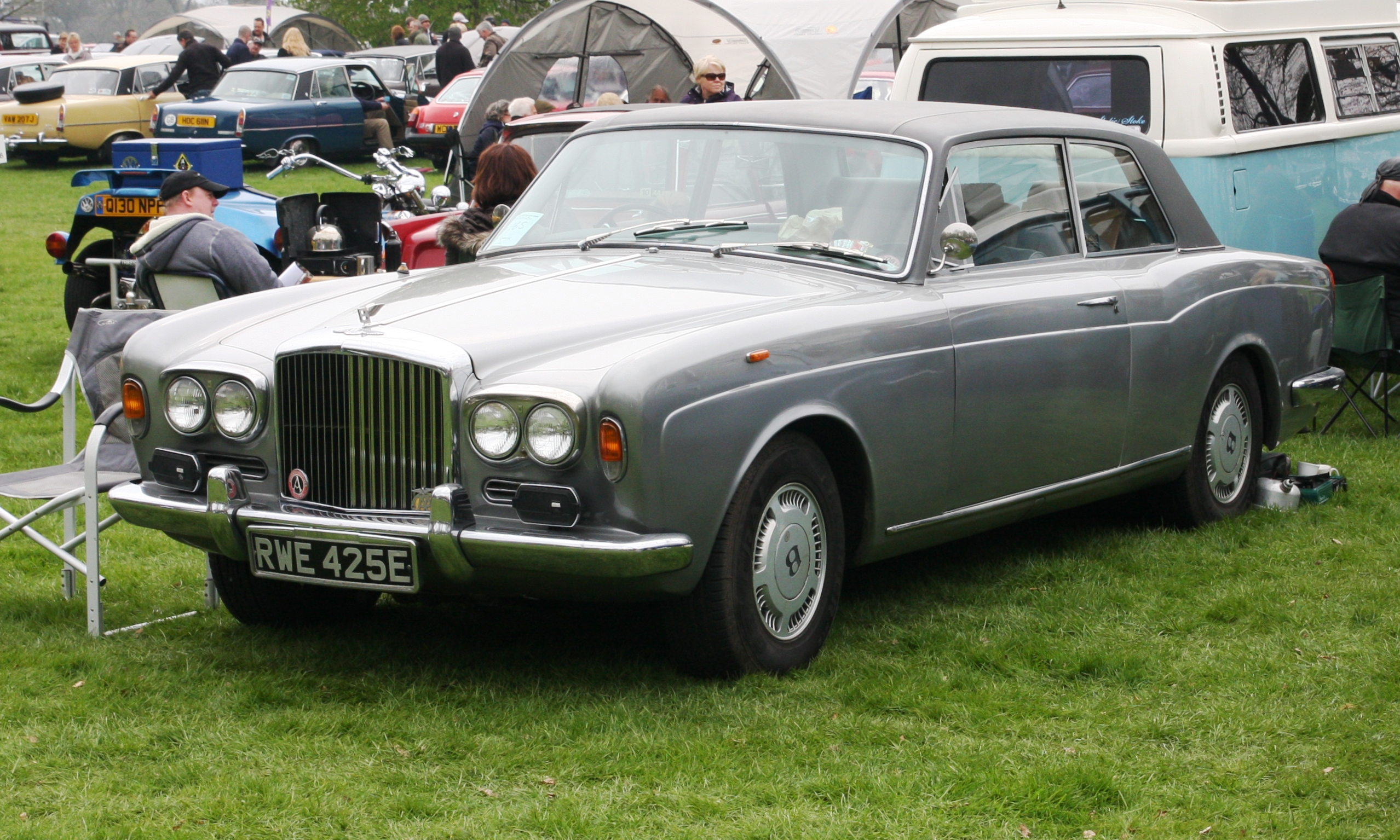
1967 T1, Mulliner Park Ward two-door saloon (on later wheels)

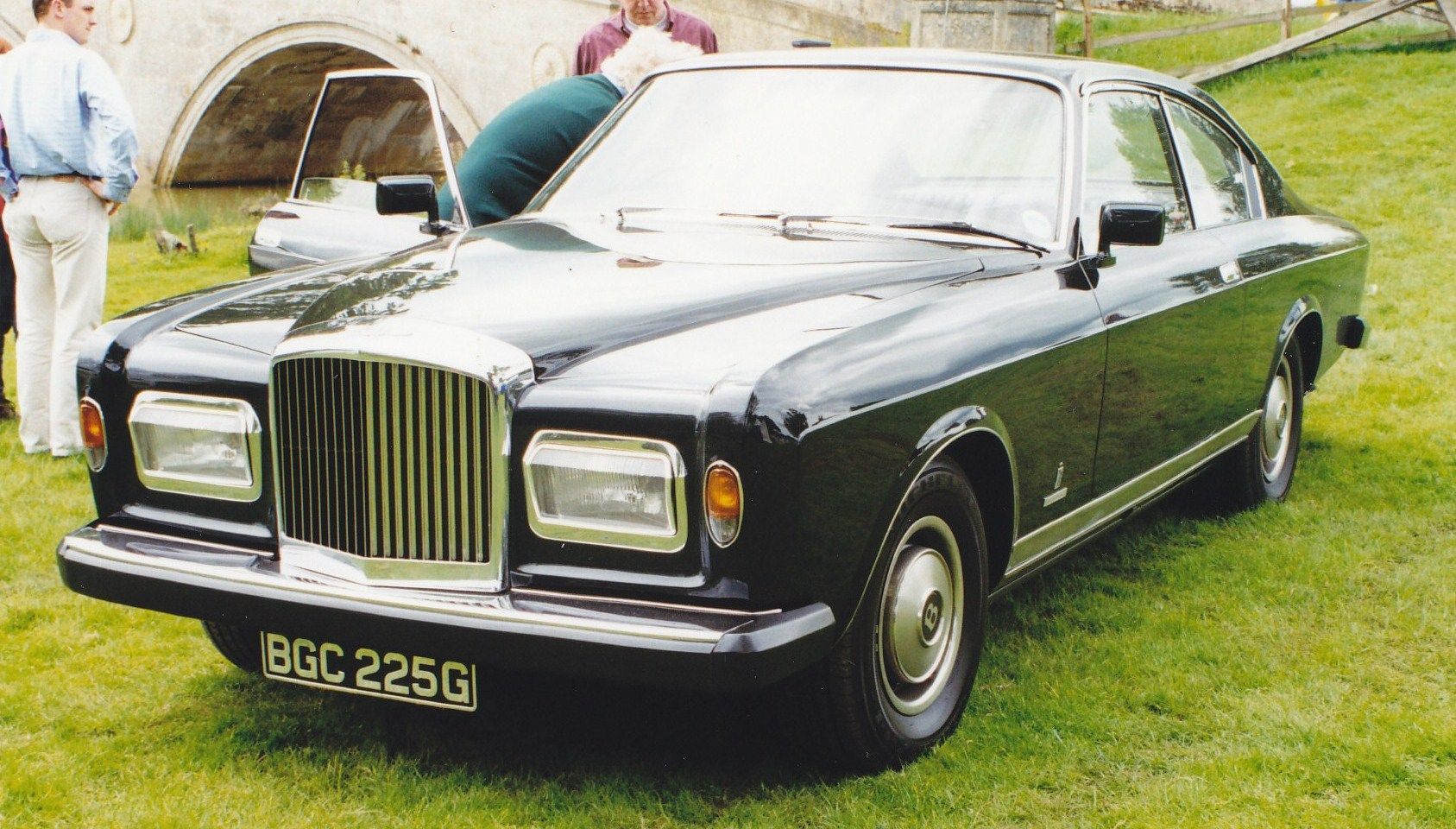
Pininfarina's one-off 1968 T1 Coupe Speciale. This model bears many similarities to the later Rolls-Royce Camargue, also designed by Paolo Martin at Pininfarina

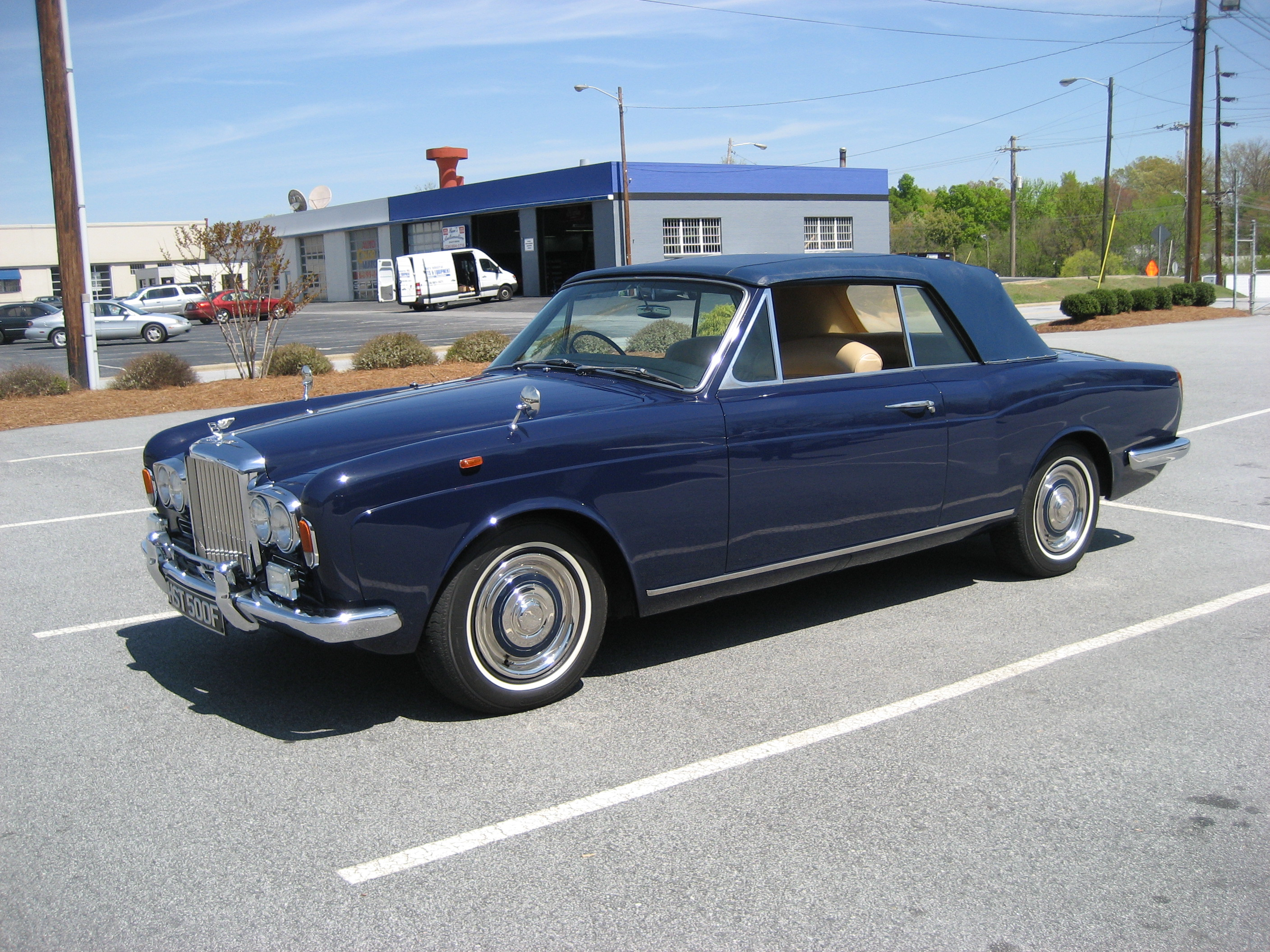
1968 T1 drophead coupé

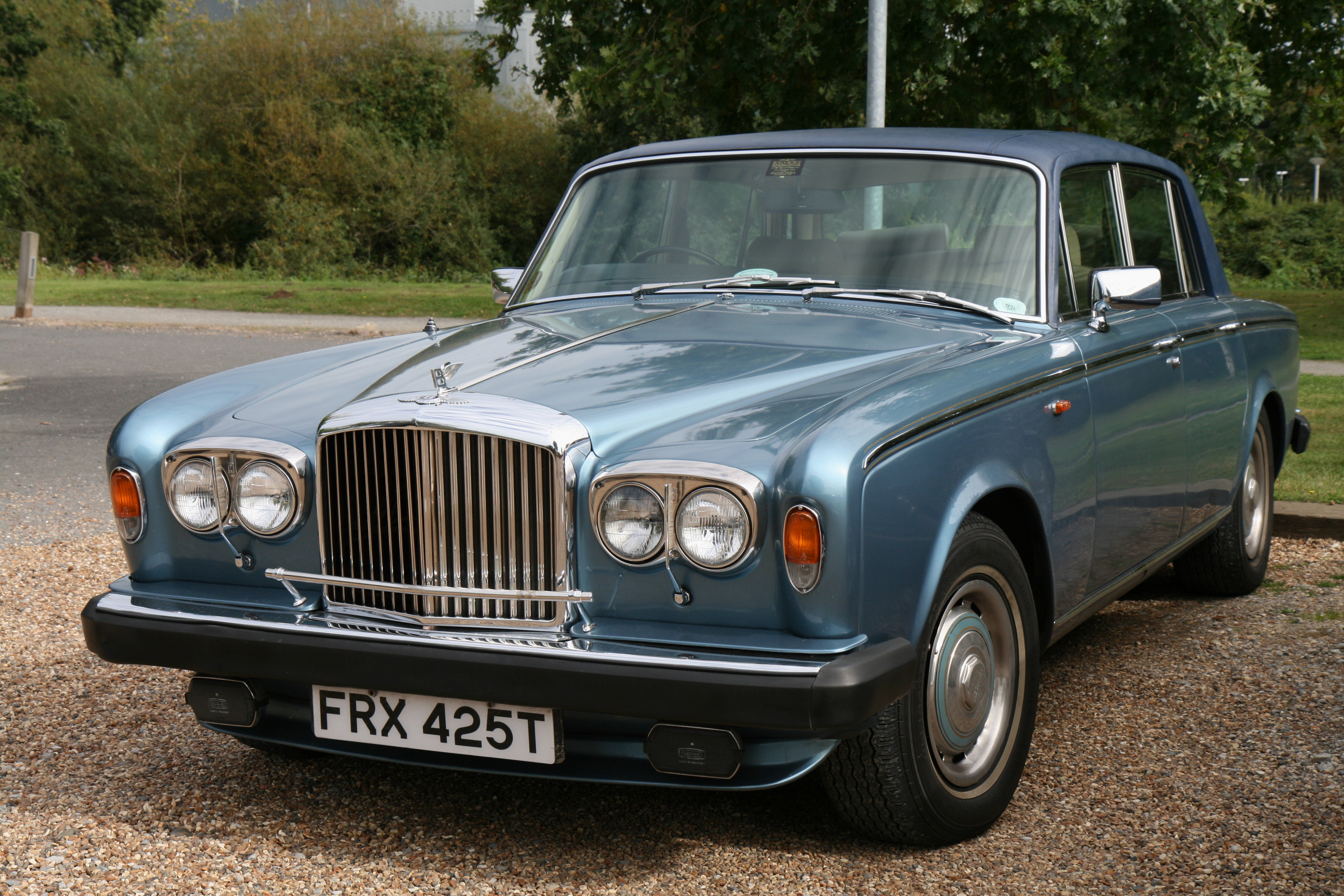
1979 Bentley T2 four-door saloon
