= Mulliner Park Ward =

British bespoke coachbuilder

Coordinates: 51.5290117°N 0.2400825°W

- Company type: Subsidiary
- Industry: Automotive
- Predecessor: H. J. Mulliner & Co. Park Ward
- Founded: Willesden, London, England, United Kingdom (1961)
- Defunct: 1998
- Fate: 1998 (acquired by Bentley when Volkswagen Group bought Rolls-Royce Motors)
- Area served: Worldwide
- Products: luxury automobiles
- Services: Coachbuilding, Automotive design

Mulliner Park Ward was a coachbuilder formed as a subsidiary by Rolls-Royce in 1961 to supply it custom bodywork for its automobiles. Located in Hythe Road, Willesden, London, it was created by merging two existing Rolls-Royce properties, Park Ward of Willesden, London, a subsidiary since 1939 and H. J. Mulliner & Co. of Chiswick, a subsidiary since 1959. It principally built bodies and interiors for Rolls-Royce and Bentley motor cars, but also others such as Alvis. The coachbuilding business closed in 1991 but the Mulliner name is used for the personal commissioning department of the current Bentley manufacturer.

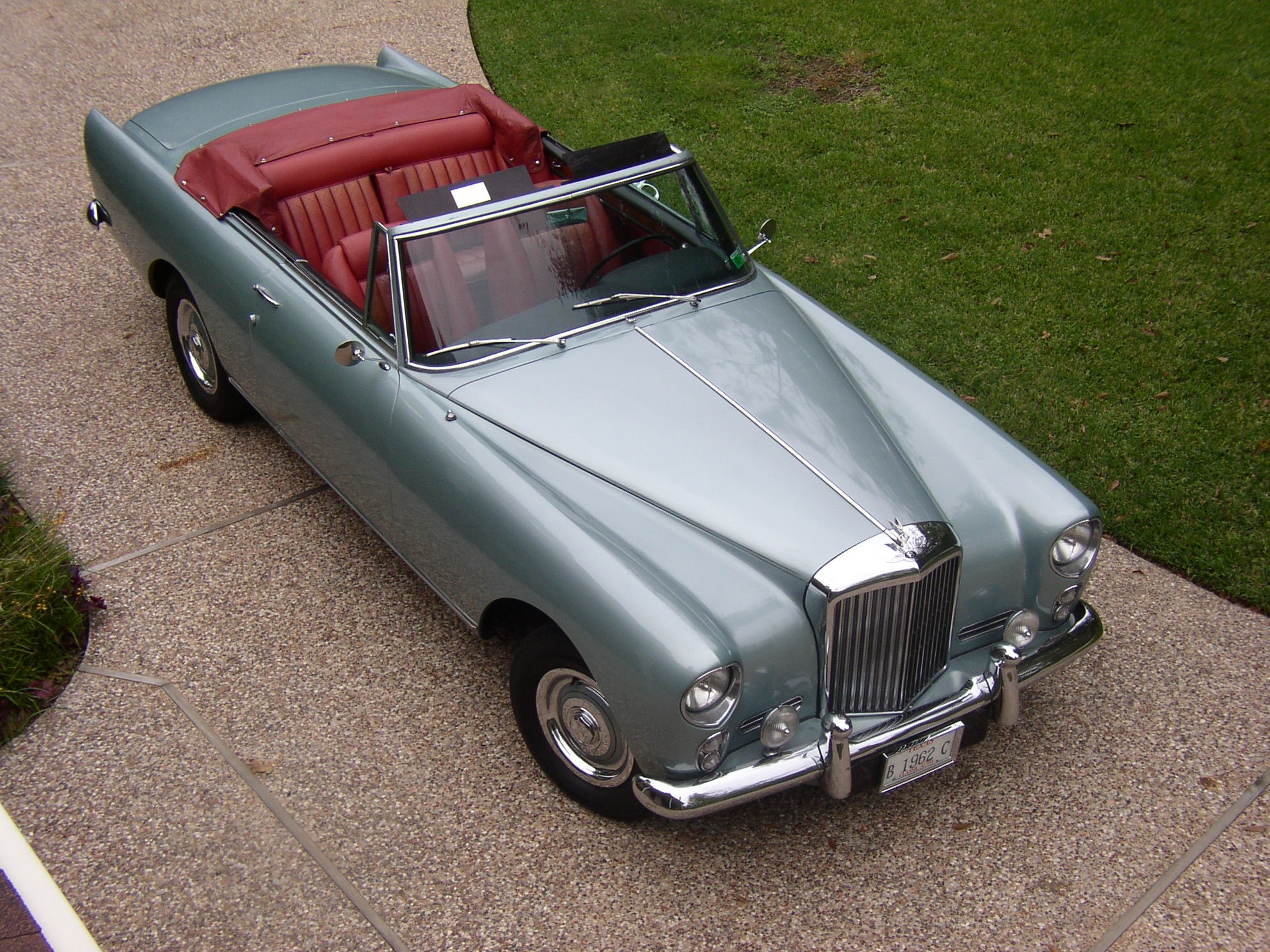
1962 Bentley Continental S2 Mulliner Park Ward

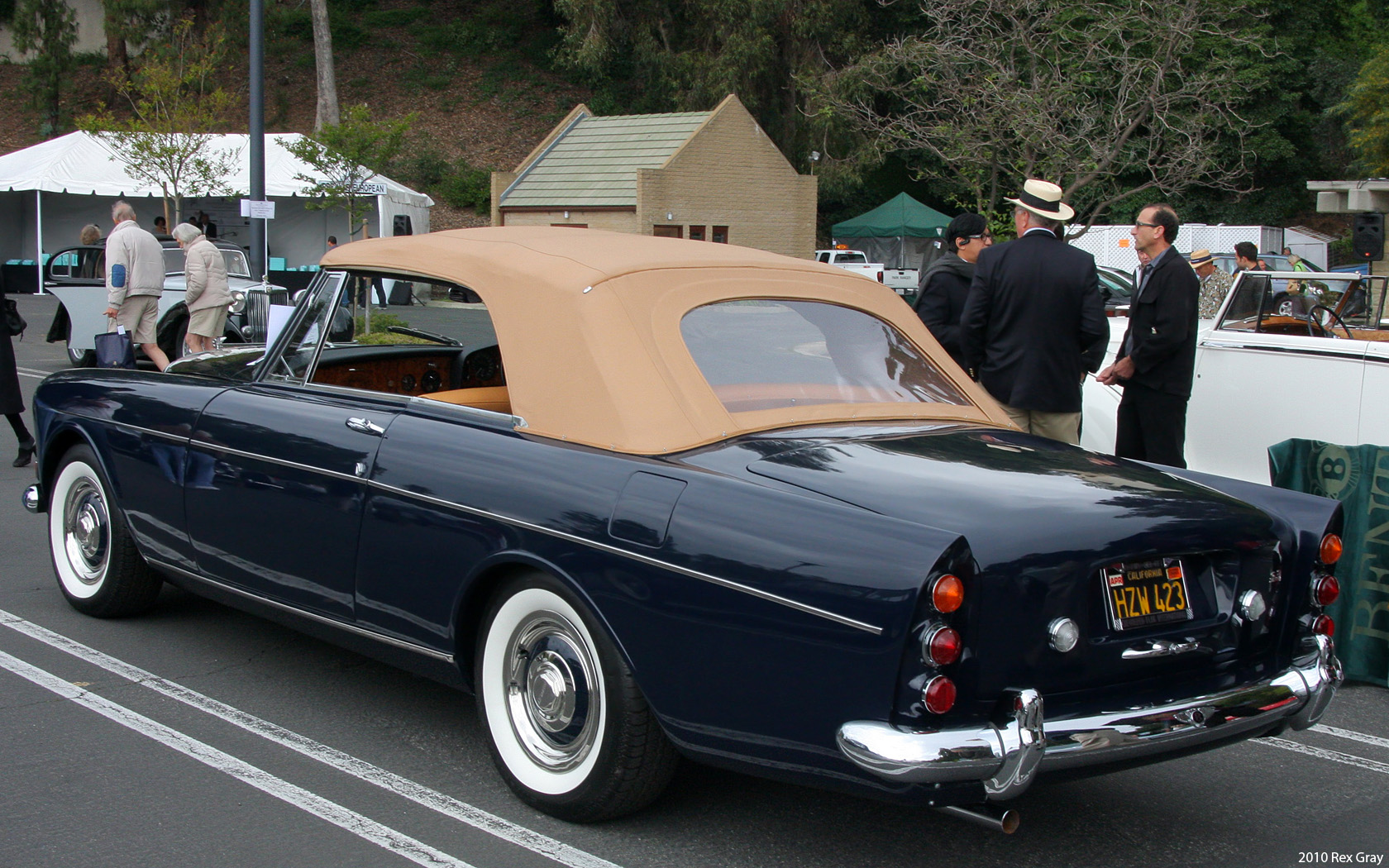
1965 Bentley Continental S3 Mulliner Park Ward
