= Bentley Crewe =

Bentley Motor company office and factory

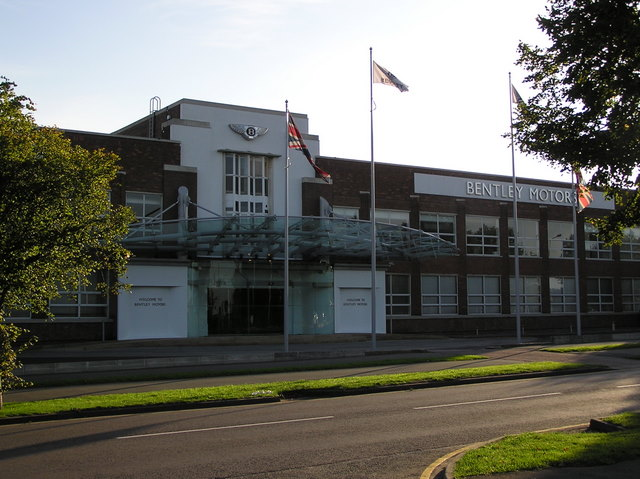

General information
- Type: Office, car factory
- Location: Crewe, Cheshire, England
- Coordinates: 53°6′14.66″N 2°28′20.47″W
- Current tenants: 3,500 employees
- Operator: Bentley Motors

Technical details
- Structural system: Steel frame/brick
- Floor area: 166,930 m^{2} (1,796,800 sq ft)
- Grounds: 521,111 m^{2} (5,609,190 sq ft)

Bentley Crewe, also named the Pyms Lane site after the street it is located on, is the headquarters and design and manufacturing centre of Bentley Motors Limited on the outskirts of Crewe, Cheshire, England. The site covers an area of 521,111 m^{2} (5,609,190 sq ft), of which 166,930 m^{2} (1,796,800 sq ft) is indoors.

== History ==
=== Rolls-Royce Crewe ===
In preparation for World War II, Rolls-Royce and the British government searched for a location for a shadow factory to ensure production of aero-engines. Crewe, with its excellent road and rail links, as well as being located in the northwest away from the aerial bombing starting in mainland Europe, was a logical choice. Crewe also had extensive open farming land. Construction of the factory started on a 60-acre area on the potato fields of Merrill's Farm in July 1938, with the first Rolls-Royce Merlin aero-engine rolling off the production line five months later. A total 25,000 Merlin engines were produced, employing 10,000 people at its peak in 1943.

=== Car production ===
With the war in Europe over and the general move towards the then new jet engines, Rolls-Royce concentrated its aero engine operations at Derby and moved motor car operations to Crewe.

In 1946 the factory produced its first motor car, the Ivan Evernden designed Bentley Mark VI (Note: An almost identical body was used some years later for the first standard steel Rolls-Royce, their Silver Wraith) which was based on the short lived Bentley Mark V. It was the first Bentley (or Rolls-Royce) with a standard pressed-steel body rather than different bodies designed and made by bespoke coach builders. The Bentley Mark VI was the most successful Bentley ever manufactured: Crewe produced more than 5,000 Mark VIs, which equaled the total number of Bentleys made in the 20 years before World War II.

The Derby designed Bentley R Type was produced until 1955 when it was succeeded by the Bentley S1/Rolls-Royce Silver Cloud, the first car wholly designed, developed, and built at Crewe. It was also the last Bentley fitted with a six-cylinder engine. Its successor, the Bentley S2, used the Crewe designed and developed 6.25-litre, all-aluminium, Rolls-Royce V8 engine, which remained in production in various forms until 2020.

==== R-Type and S-Type Bentleys ====
While the Bentley R-Type and S-Type differed significantly from the corresponding Rolls-Royce models, the 1965 Bentley T-series/Rolls-Royce Silver Shadow differed only in badges and radiator grills. The Bentley models even used a Rolls-Royce badged engine. As a result, fewer Bentleys were sold, making them more valuable today. The Bentley T-series/Rolls-Royce Silver Shadow were the first models with monocoque construction and four-wheel disc brakes.

The 1980 badge engineered Bentley Mulsanne was the last Bentley to undersell its Rolls-Royce sister, in this case the Rolls-Royce Silver Spirit. When the Rolls-Royce Motor Car division was sold to Vickers plc in 1980, Bentley changed its image, resulting in the 140 miles per hour (230 km/h) Bentley Mulsanne Turbo, nicknamed the "Crewe missile", which accelerated faster than some Ferraris. After this point, while the two marques looked similar, Bentleys were designed to appeal typically to wealthy businessmen, while Rolls-Royce maintained their appeal to the traditional wealthy. The result was a surge in Bentley sales, which by 1985, had over taken Rolls-Royce sales for the first time since car production moved to Crewe.

=== Rolls-Royce and Bentley split ===
1998 brought the launch of the all-new Bentley Arnage/Rolls-Royce Silver Seraph, the last dual-brand model, powered by a BMW 4.4 litre twin-turbo V8 engine. The same year, Vickers announced its intention to sell its car division, which included the Bentley brand and the Crewe factory but not the Rolls-Royce brand which would return to Rolls-Royce Group in the event of a sale.

BMW, Mercedes-Benz, and the Volkswagen Group expressed interest, but Volkswagen eventually outbid BMW, while Mercedes withdrew, instead deciding to revive the Maybach brand for their luxury cars. However, BMW did buy the Rolls-Royce brand name from Rolls-Royce. They also agreed with the Volkswagen Group a handover plan, which would complete at the end of 2001.

In 2000, BMW's new Rolls-Royce Motor Cars division announced that they would build a new manufacturing plant at the historic Goodwood Estate in West Sussex.

== Present ==
Having been heavily underinvested for some time, Volkswagen Group invested £500M in the two years after its takeover of the Crewe plant. It also revived development on the Rolls-Royce V8 which it owned the rights to, resulting in the sub-division of the Bentley Arnage into the Green-label (powered by the BMW V8), and the Red-label (powered by the redeveloped RR V8). Very quickly the Red-label out sold the Green-label, and resulted in Volkswagen further developing the engine. Today's version shares no components with the original version used in the S1, but shares its lineage and is according to director of engineering Dr Ulrich Eichhorn:

Today’s V8 is a descendant of the 1959 engine but massively improved. It now has over 100 percent more power, over 100 percent more torque, 40 percent less fuel consumption and produces 99.5 percent fewer emissions.

With the end of production of Rolls-Royce badged cars in 2002, the factory was redeveloped to allow an expansion of the Bentley brand through a series of new models. 2003's introduction of the Bentley Continental GT was nominally to replace the previous Rolls-Royce-based Continental R and T, but was the first Bentley-only developed vehicle since the merging of the brands in 1931. Equipped with a 5,998 cubic centimetres (366.0 cu in) (6.0 litre) twin-turbocharged W12 engine, which produces a DIN-rated motive power output of 560 metric horsepower (412 kW; 552 bhp) at 6,100 rpm, and torque of 650 newton-metres (479 lbf⋅ft) at 1,600 rpm. Torsen-based permanent four-wheel drive is standard, allowing it to accelerate from 0 to 100 kilometres per hour (0.0 to 62.1 mph) in 4.8 seconds, and go on to reach a top speed of 318 kilometres per hour (197.6 mph). 2005 saw the introduction of the 4 door derived version, the Continental Flying Spur. Due to a lack of capacity at the Crewe upon the car's introduction, some Flying Spurs destined for markets other than the USA and UK were built at Volkswagen's Transparent Factory in Dresden, Germany. This arrangement ended in 2006, when all assembly work reverted to Crewe.

Unveiled at the 2009 Pebble Beach Concours d'Elegance, the Bentley Mulsanne is notable as the first flagship car to be independently designed by Bentley Motors in nearly 80 years; the last being W.O. Bentley's iconic 8 litre model in 1930. Replacing the Arnage, and using a modified V8 to meet Euro V emissions regulations, the car went on sale during 2010.

Since 2015, the Bentley Bentayga has been assembled at the factory.
