= Bentley S3 =

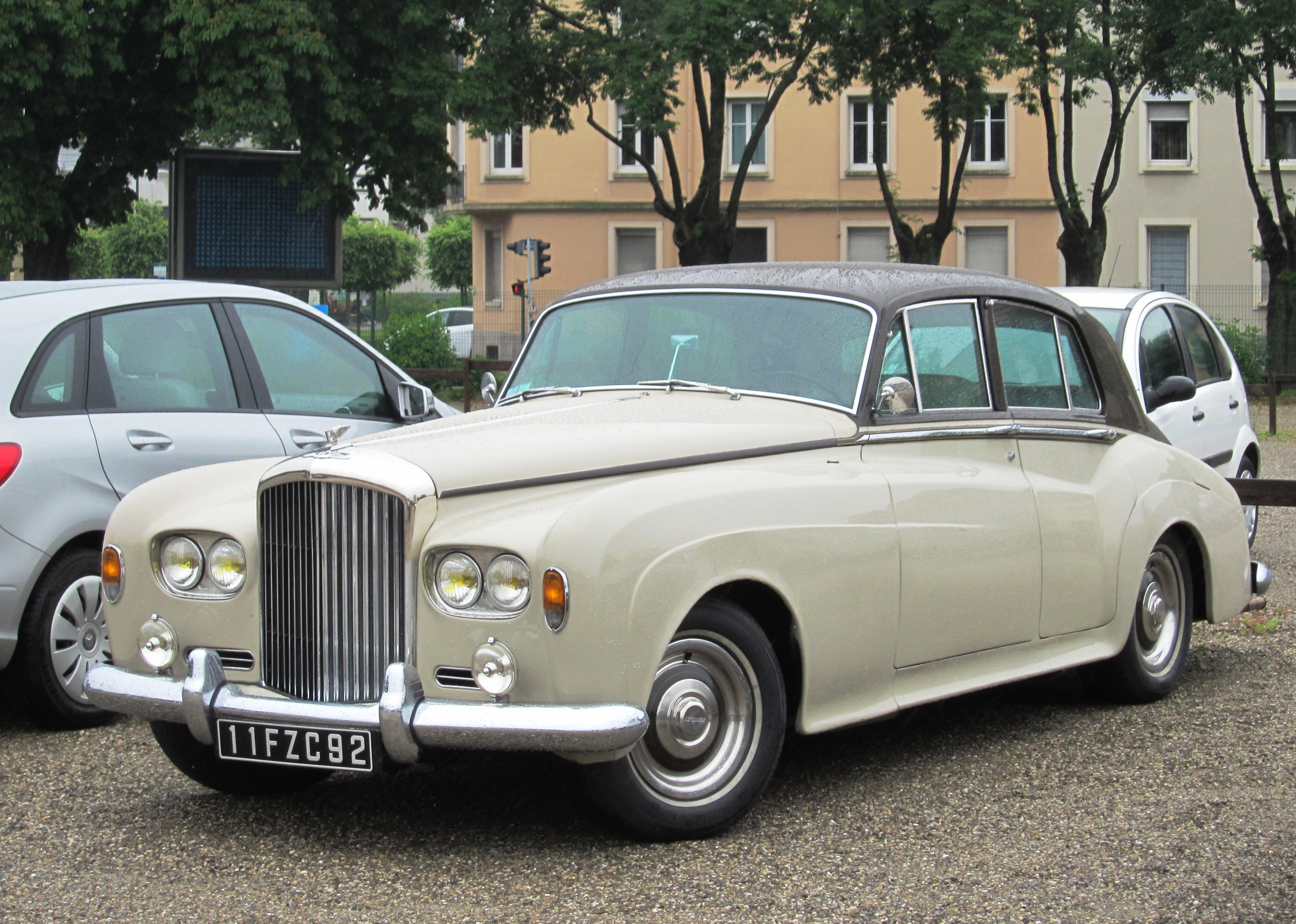
- S3 saloon

Overview
- Manufacturer: Bentley Motors Limited (1931)
- Production: 1962–1965
- Assembly: United Kingdom: Crewe (Bentley Crewe)

Body and chassis
- Class: Full-size luxury car
- Body style: 4-door saloon; 2-door coupé; 2-door drophead coupé
- Layout: FR layout
- Platform: separate chassis
- Related: Bentley S3 Continental; Rolls-Royce Silver Cloud III

Powertrain
- Engine: 6.2 L Bentley V8
- Transmission: 4-speed automatic

Dimensions
- Wheelbase: SWB: 123 in (3,124.2 mm); LWB: 127 in (3,225.8 mm)
- Length: 212.0 in (5,384.8 mm)
- Width: 74.8 in (1,898.7 mm)
- Height: 64.3 in (1,632.0 mm)
- Kerb weight: 4,228.5 lb (1,918 kg)

Chronology
- Predecessor: Bentley S2
- Successor: Bentley T1

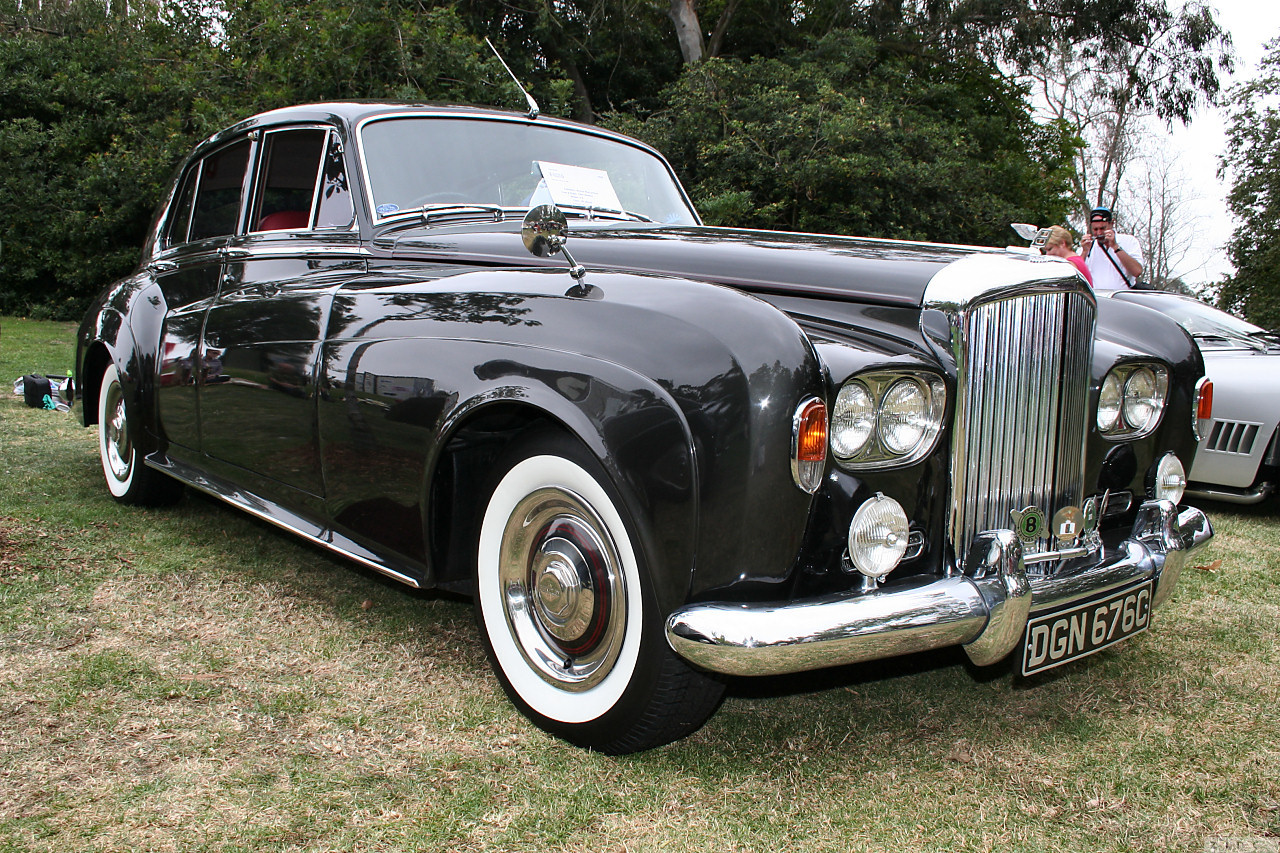
S3 saloon. The body featured dual headlights and a slightly lowered hood line and grille (1964)

The Bentley S3 is a four-door luxury car produced by Bentley from late 1962 until 1965, as the successor of the Bentley S2.

== Description ==
The S3 was first announced and displayed at the Paris Motor Show in October 1962. The car was very similar to the preceding S2, with the most-visible exterior difference being a four-headlamp layout reflecting that introduced on the Rolls-Royce Silver Cloud III the same model year. The radiator was lowered 1½ inches allowing a lower bonnet line, and other exterior differences included restyled front mudguards and smaller over-riders on the bumpers front and rear. The interior was modified with individual seats for front passengers and a rear seat moved two inches rearward for increased leg room. The 6.2 L (6230 cc/380 cu in) V8 engine continued with larger carburettors and compression raised from 8:1 to 9:1, increasing power output by 7%. The engine upgrades brought improved acceleration and a top speed of 115 mph with no loss of economy; for the American market an engine "breather" was employed to reduce air pollution. The power steering was also improved.

The S3 was priced at £6,126, over triple the top of the range British-built Jaguar Mark X (at £2,022, including all taxes). The Park Ward Continental sports saloon was £8,495, a premium of about 40% over an S3.

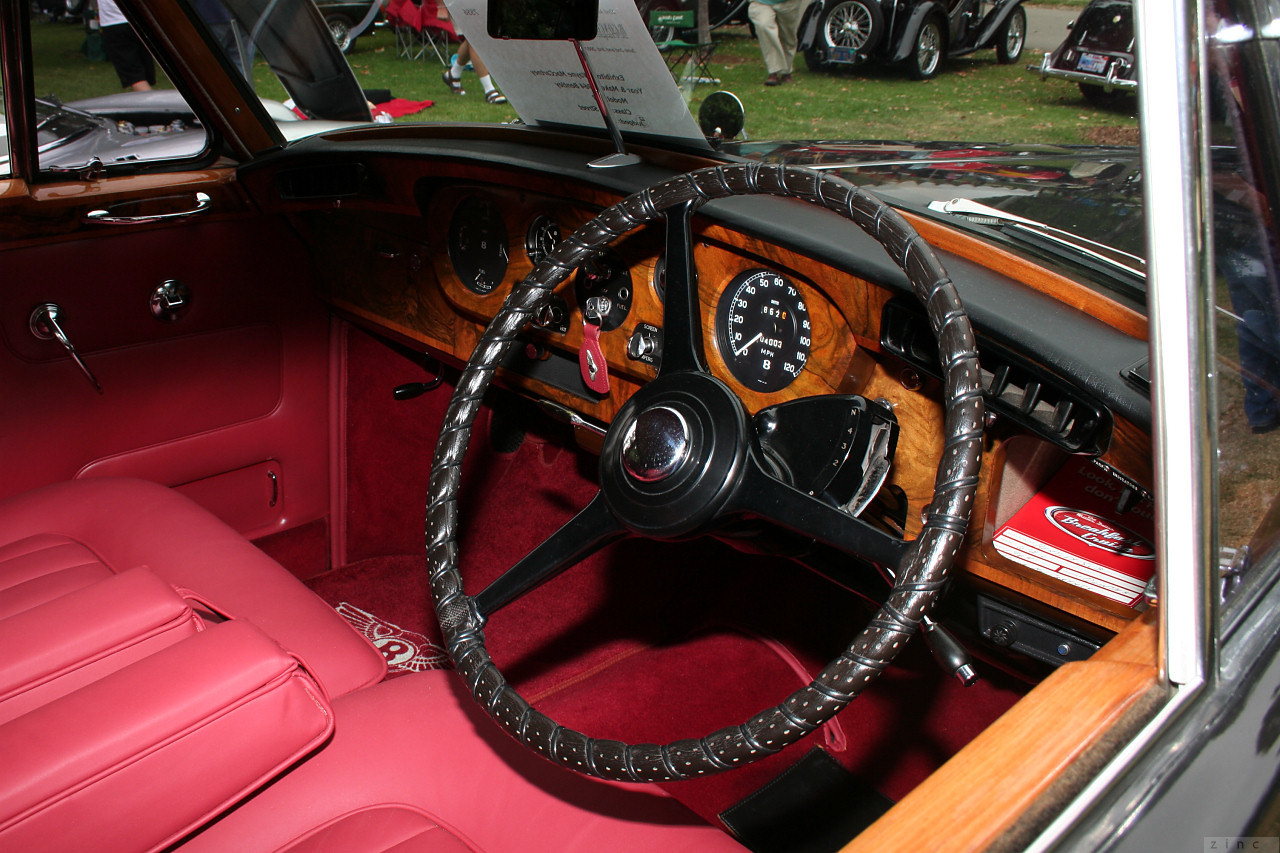
1964 S3 dashboard

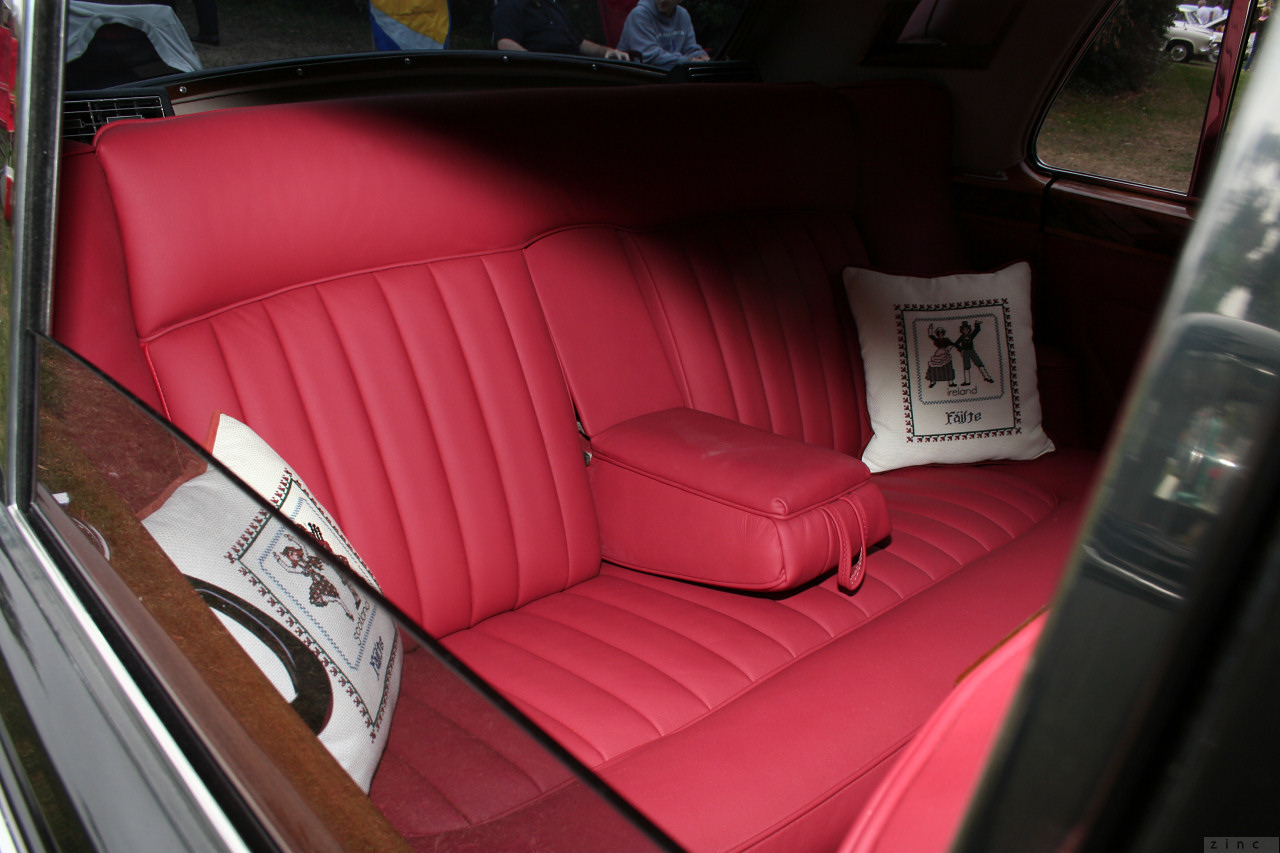
1964 S3 rear seat

== S3 Continental ==
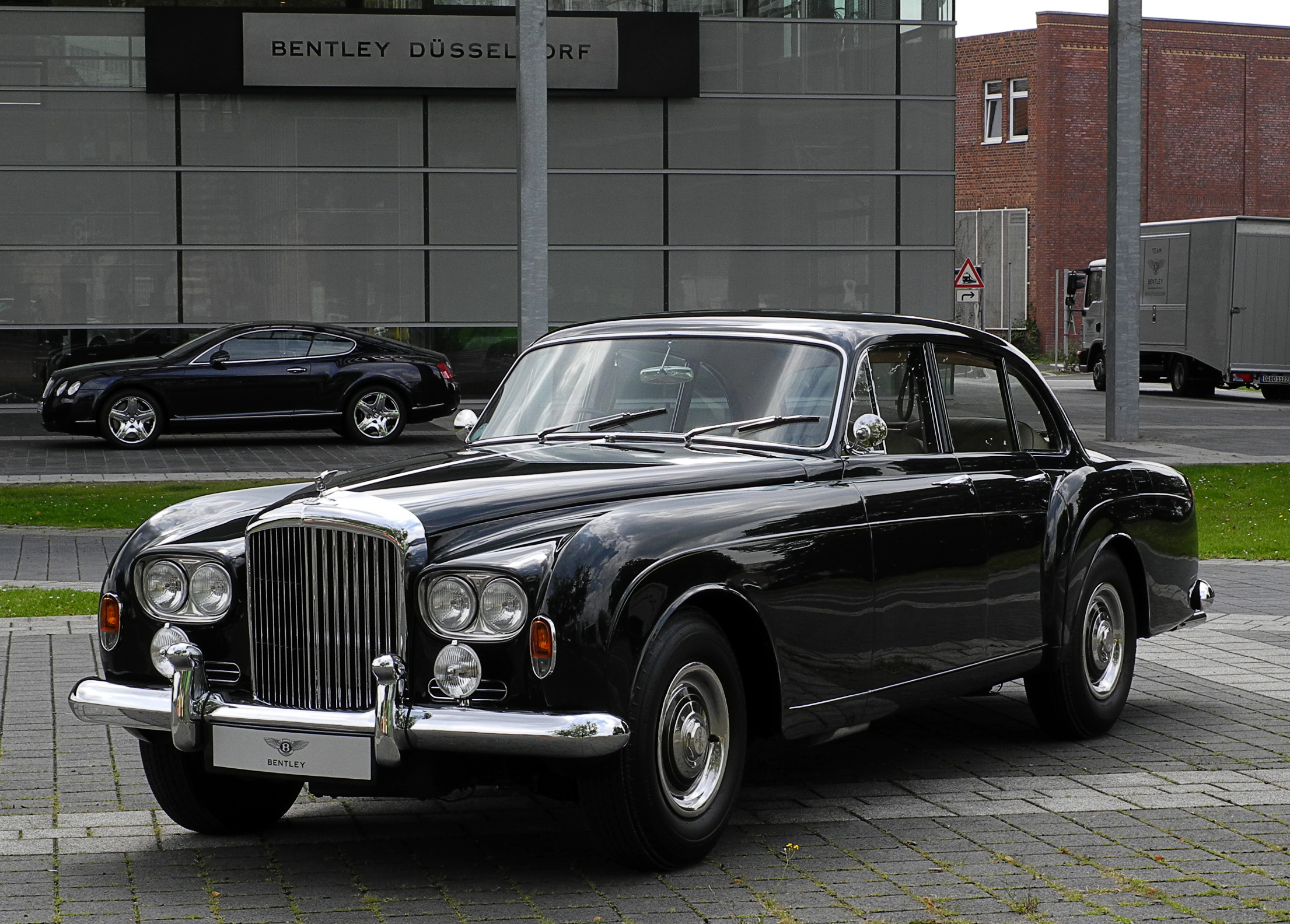
Continental Flying Spur by Mulliner Park Ward

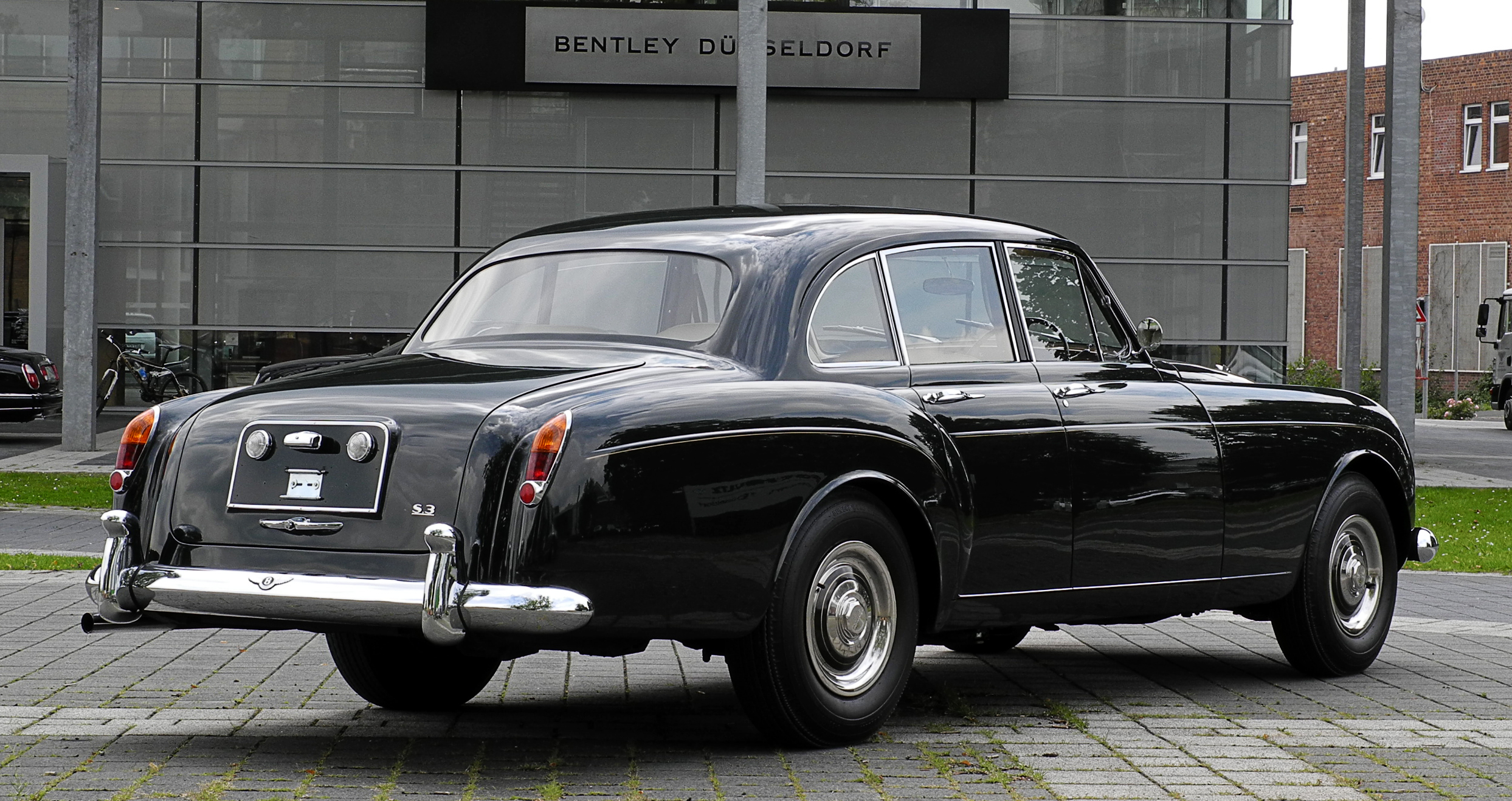
S3 Continental Flying Spur by HJ Mulliner

In 1959, Rolls-Royce acquired H. J. Mulliner & Co., coachbuilders (HJM). In 1961, HJM was merged with Park Ward, which had been in the possession of Rolls-Royce since 1939, to form Mulliner, Park Ward Ltd. (MPW). When production of the S3 Continentals commenced there were more differences than the adaption of the previous HJM design by Mulliner Park Ward: The cars were built at the former Park Ward premises in Willesden, North London. The HJM facilities were abandoned.

The S3 Continental was strictly coachbuilt. Most bodies were of the altered HJM style, available in fixed head or drop head coupe form. Of the 328 coachbuilt S3 (Continentals included here), nearly 100 were by MPW. Again, fixed head or a drop head coupe configurations were available. The most prominent visual difference from the S2 configuration was the four canted headlights.

For the first time, this body was offered on the Rolls-Royce Silver Cloud, as well as the S3 chassis. The final S3 was delivered in 1966, when the new Rolls-Royce Silver Shadow and Bentley T-series were readily available. Like earlier Continentals, the sportier S3 bodywork was manufactured entirely from aluminium, unlike the heavier, steel bodied S3 saloon. This, combined with higher gearing and the better compression ratios made for a markedly faster car. Four-doored Continentals bodied by H. J. Mulliner were known as the "Flying Spur", although four-door Continentals by other coachbuilders are sometimes erroneously referred to as "Flying Spurs" as well; the term only correctly refers to Mulliner's versions. Another elegant four-door saloon for the S3 Continental came from James Young).

Despite being highly desirable the extremely expensive Continentals (a premium of 40-50% over the very expensive S3) sold in much smaller quantities than the S3 saloon by a factor of four.

== Production ==
- S3: 1,286 (1 drophead coupé by Mulliner Park Ward)
- S3 long wheelbase: 32 (7 with coachbuilt bodies by James Young)
- S3 Continental: 311 (291 by Mulliner Park Ward and 20 by James Young)
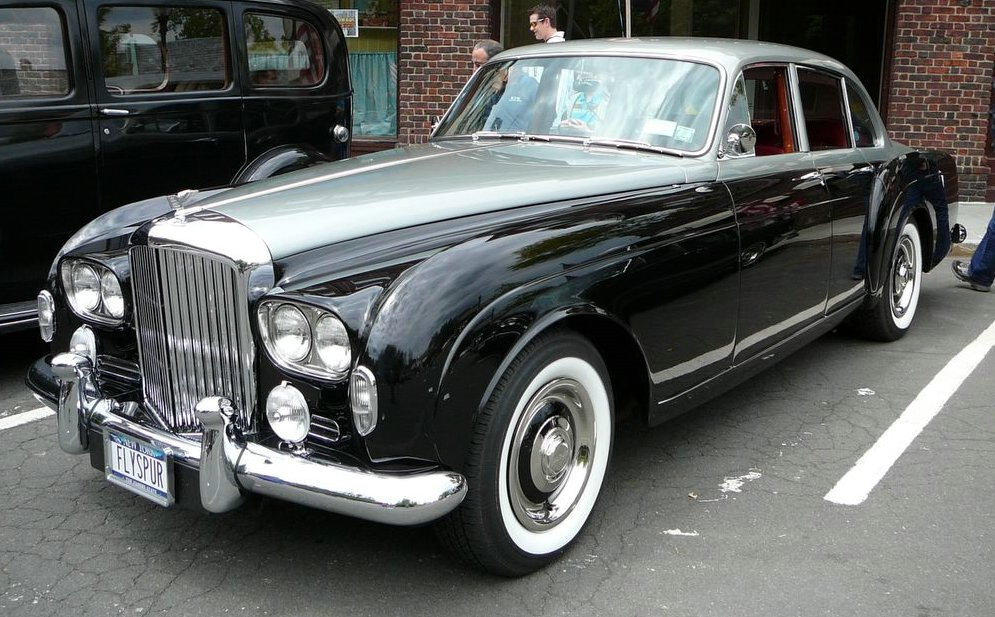
Flying Spur
by Mulliner Park Ward

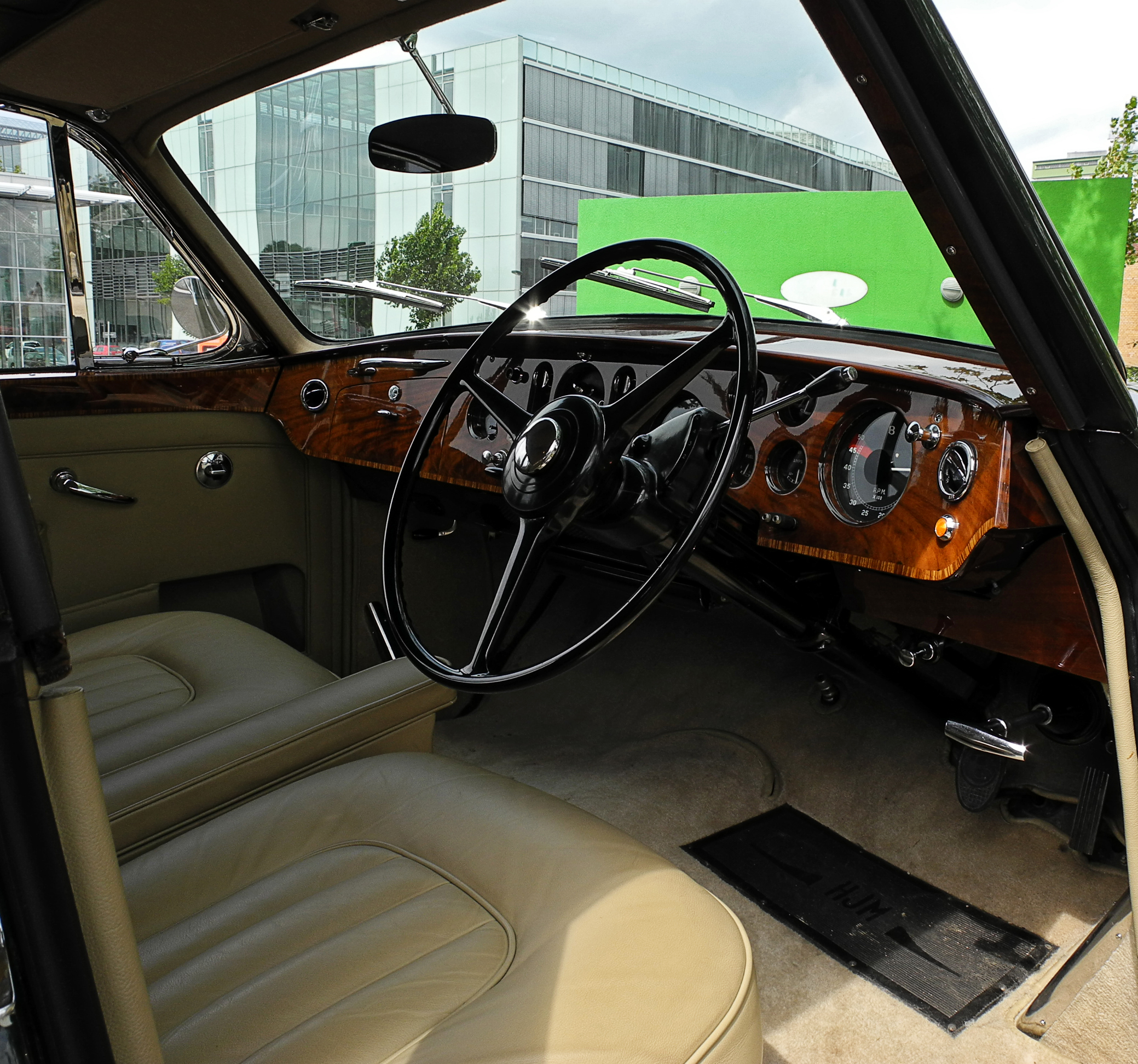
Flying Spur
by Mulliner Park Ward

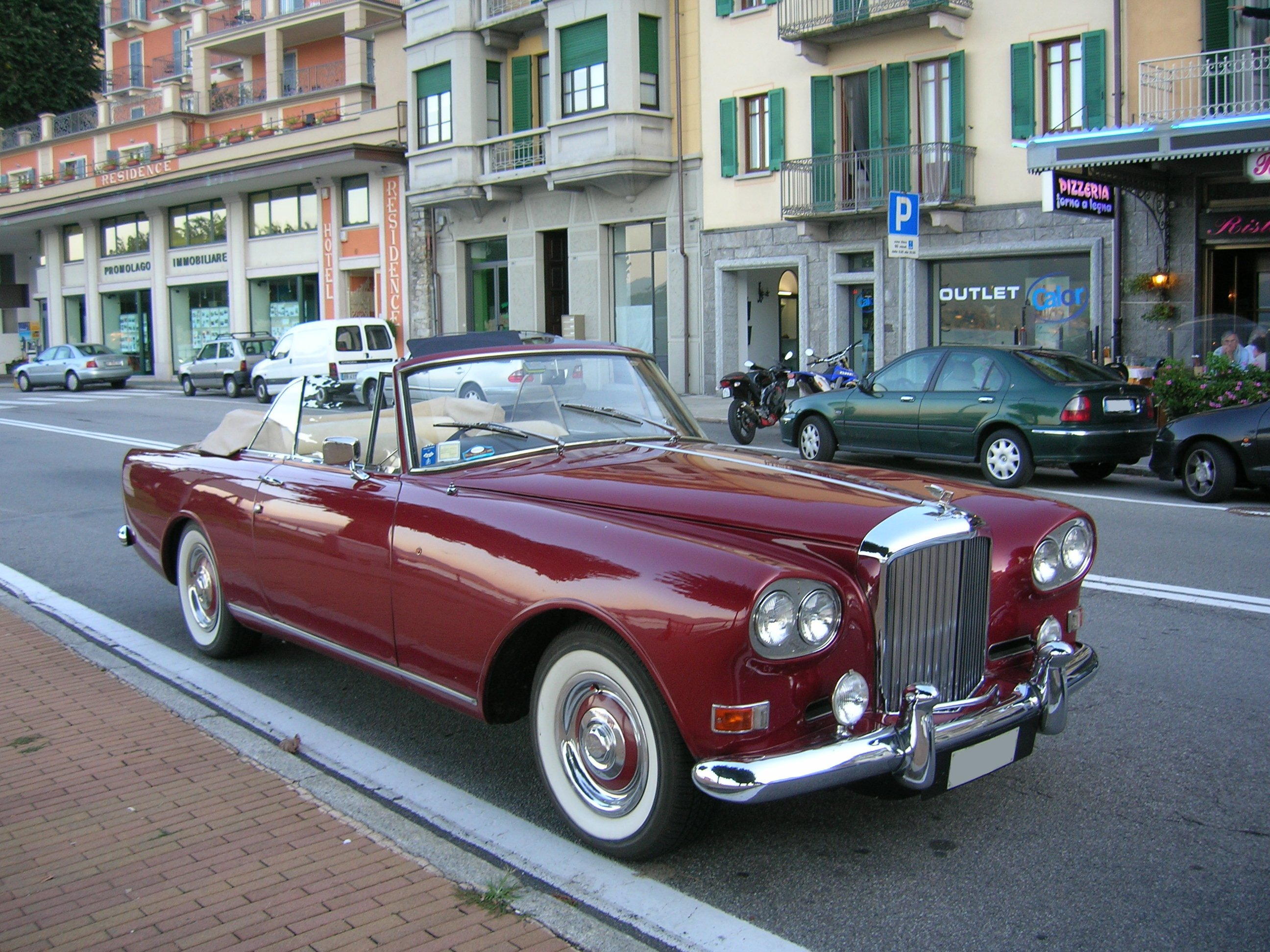
Drophead coupé
by Mulliner Park Ward

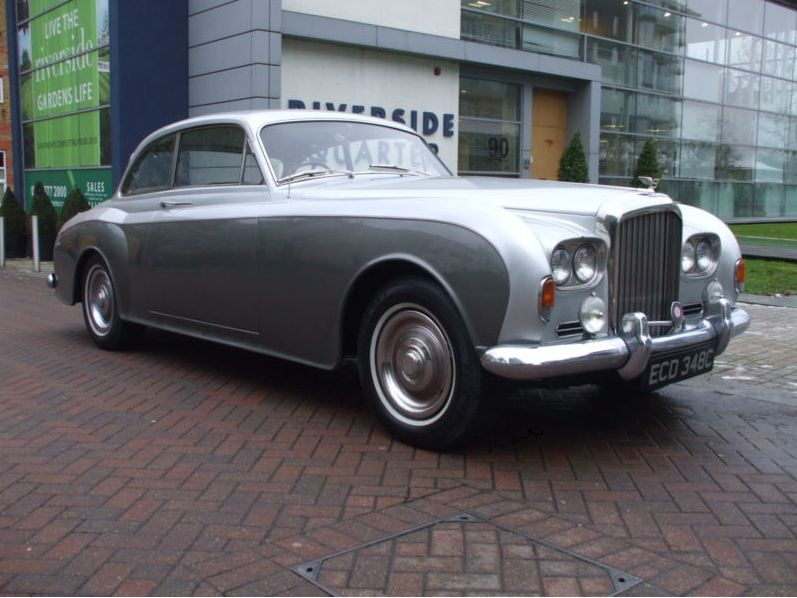
Coupé
by James Young

== Sources ==
- Dalton, Lawrence: "Rolls-Royce - The Elegance Continues", Dalton-Watson Ltd., Publishers, London, England, ISBN 0-901564-05-2
- Walker, Nick: A-Z of British Coachbuilders, 1919–1960; Bay View Books, Bideford, Devon, UK (1997), ISBN 1-870979-93-1

== See also ==
- Bentley
- Bentley Continental
- Bentley-Talk: Exclusive Bentley Online Community
