= Bentley S2 =

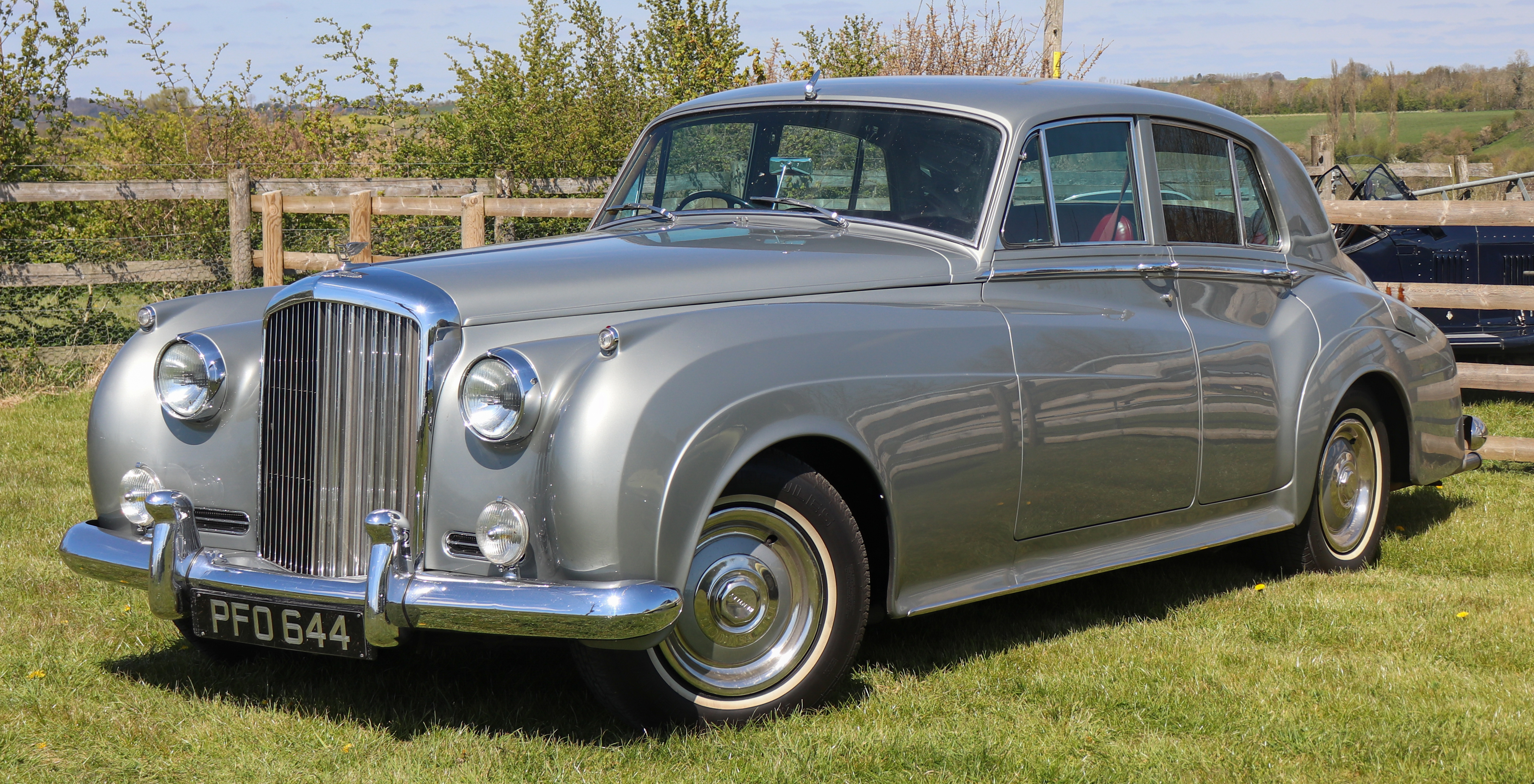
- Standard saloon

Overview
- Manufacturer: Bentley Motors Limited (1931)
- Production: 1959–1962; 2,308 produced
- Assembly: United Kingdom: Crewe (Bentley Crewe)

Body and chassis
- Body style: 4-door saloon; 2-door saloon; 2-door drophead coupé
- Related: Rolls-Royce Silver Cloud II

Powertrain
- Engine: 6.2 L Bentley L410 V8
- Transmission: 4-speed automatic

Dimensions
- Wheelbase: SWB: 123 in (3,124 mm); LWB: 127 in (3,226 mm)
- Width: 74.8 in (1,898.7 mm)
- Height: 64.3 in (1,632.0 mm)

Chronology
- Predecessor: Bentley S1
- Successor: Bentley S3

The Bentley S2 is a luxury car produced by Bentley from 1959 until 1962. The successor to the S1, it featured the new Rolls-Royce–Bentley L-series V8 engine and improved air conditioning made possible by that engine's increased output. Power steering was also standard, and a new dashboard and steering wheel were introduced. Some early S2s were built using the dashboard of the preceding S1.

A high-performance S2-derived Continental edition was also produced.

1,863 standard and 57 long-wheelbase S2 chassis were built between 1959 and 1962. Almost all were fitted with standard factory bodywork. A number had coachbuilt bodies by Park Ward, Hooper, H. J. Mulliner & Co., and James Young.

== S2 ==
Announced at the beginning of October 1959 the S2 replaced the S1's straight-six engine with the new aluminium Rolls-Royce - Bentley L Series V8 shared with the Rolls-Royce Silver Cloud II. It displaced 6.2 L (6230 cc, or 380 cu in), and offered significantly improved performance.

As advertised in The Times, Friday, 2 October 1959:

The cylinder block and heads are cast in aluminium alloy and hydraulic tappets operate the overhead valves. The engine has a compression ratio of 8 to 1 and is fitted with twin carburetors with automatic choke.
Other features available include fully automatic transmission, power-assisted steering, electrically operated ride control, redesigned and more flexible air conditioning, electric rear window demisters and press button window lifts.

Of the 1,863 standard S2 models produced, 15 had H. J. Mulliner & Co. drophead coupé bodies. Of the 57 long-wheelbase cars, five had James Young bodies and one a Mercedes-Bentley yachting station-wagon body by Wendler.

== S2 Continental ==
An "S2 Continental" chassis was built with higher performance engines and higher gearing for lighter bodywork. 388 were built, bodied by the same group of coachbuilders as the standard S2.

== Gallery ==
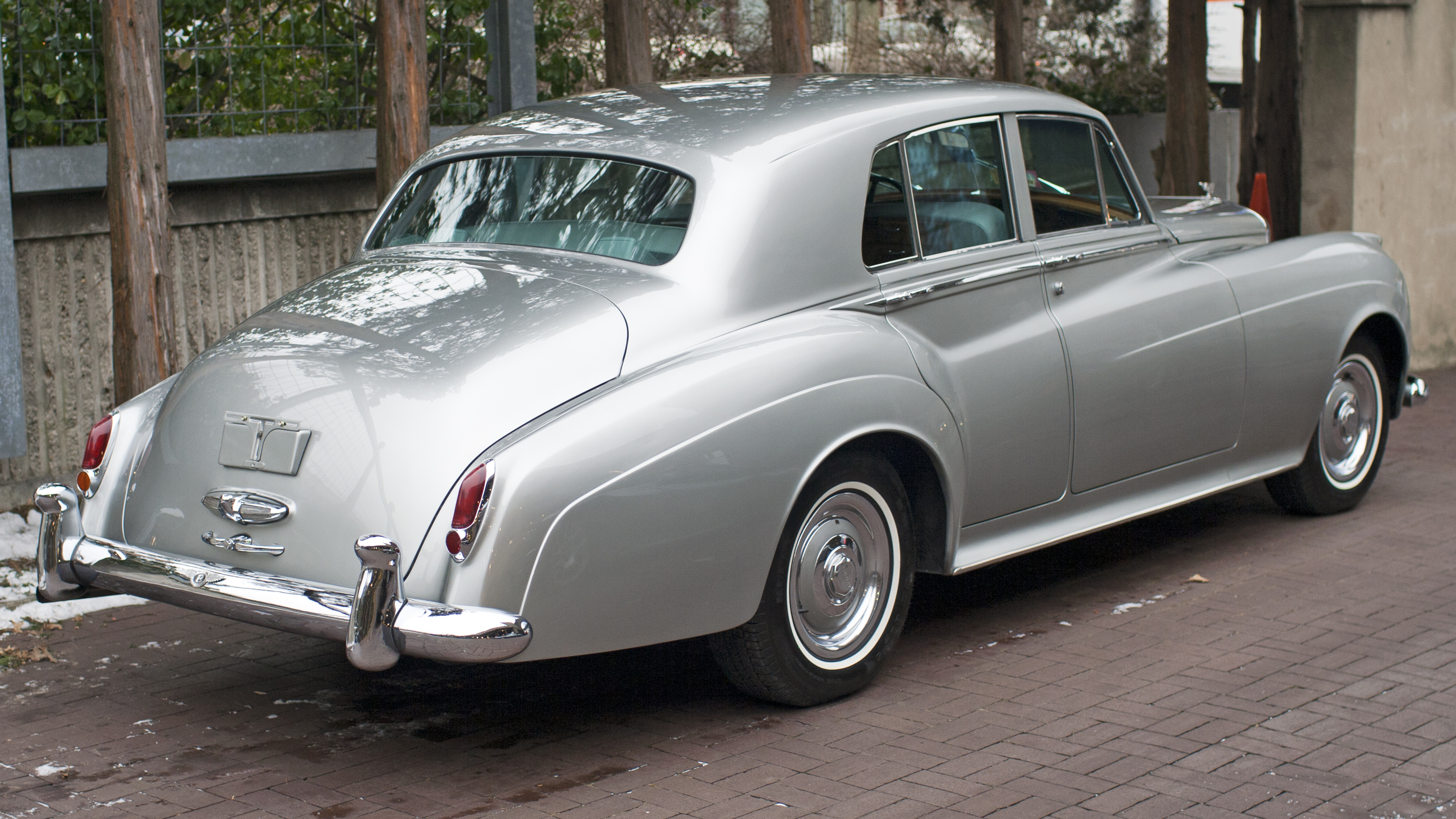
Bentley S2 standard saloon (rear view)

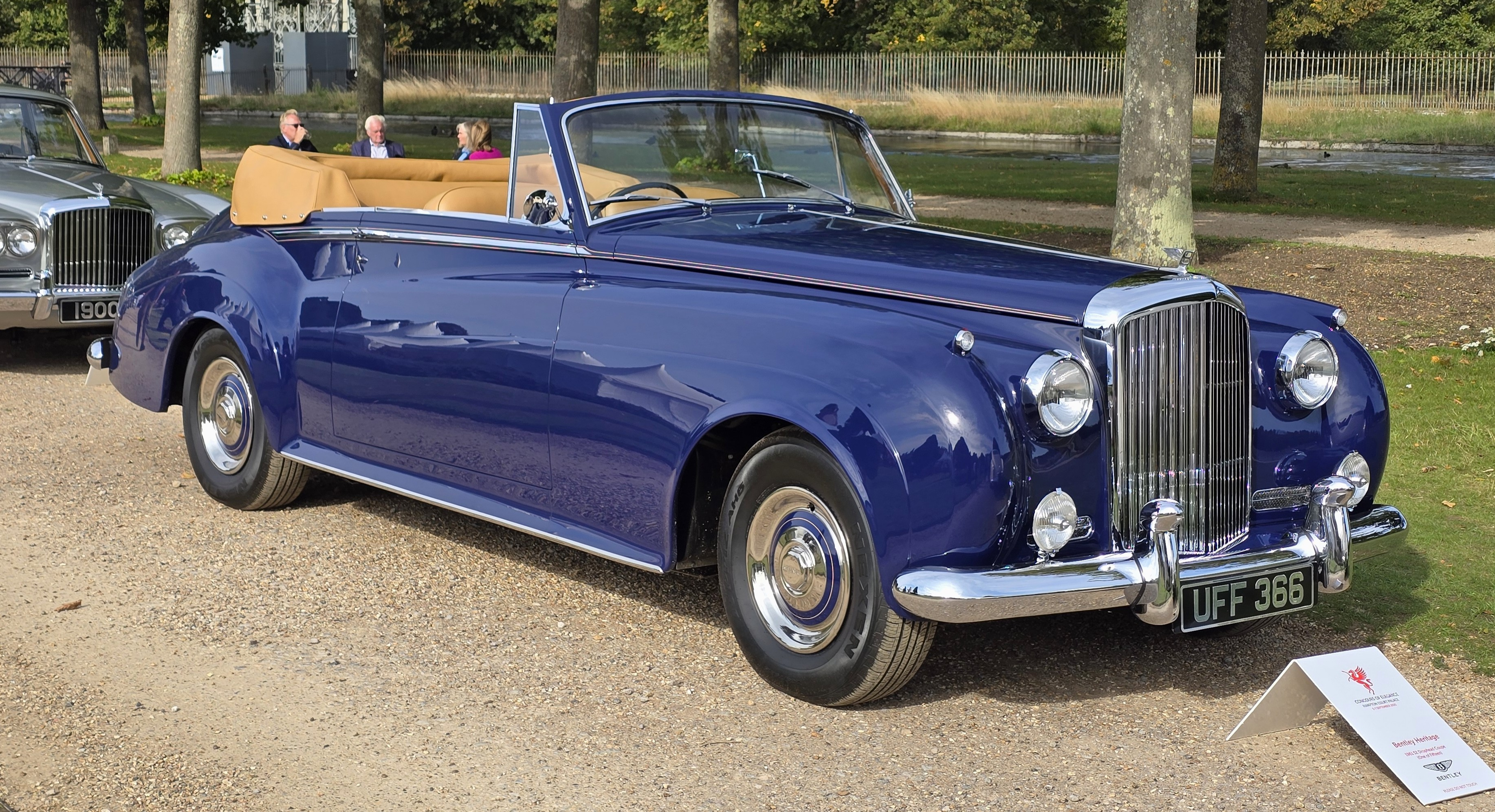
1962 Bentley S2 drophead coupé by H J Mulliner

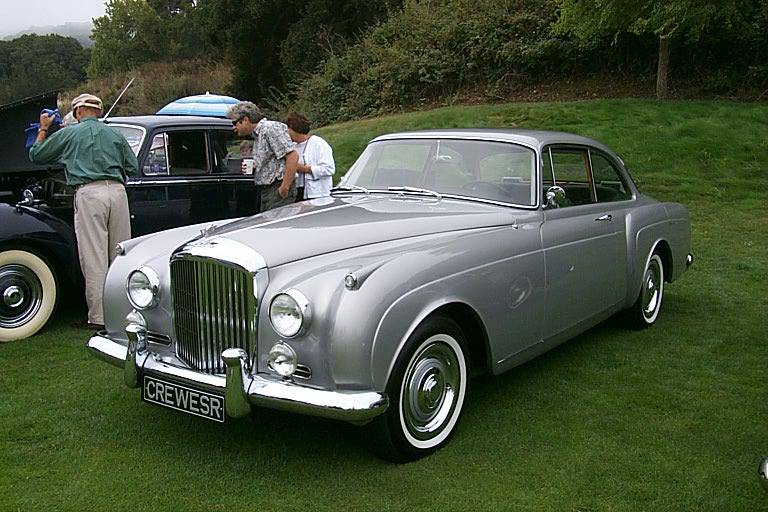
Bentley Continental S2 2-door saloon by H J Mulliner

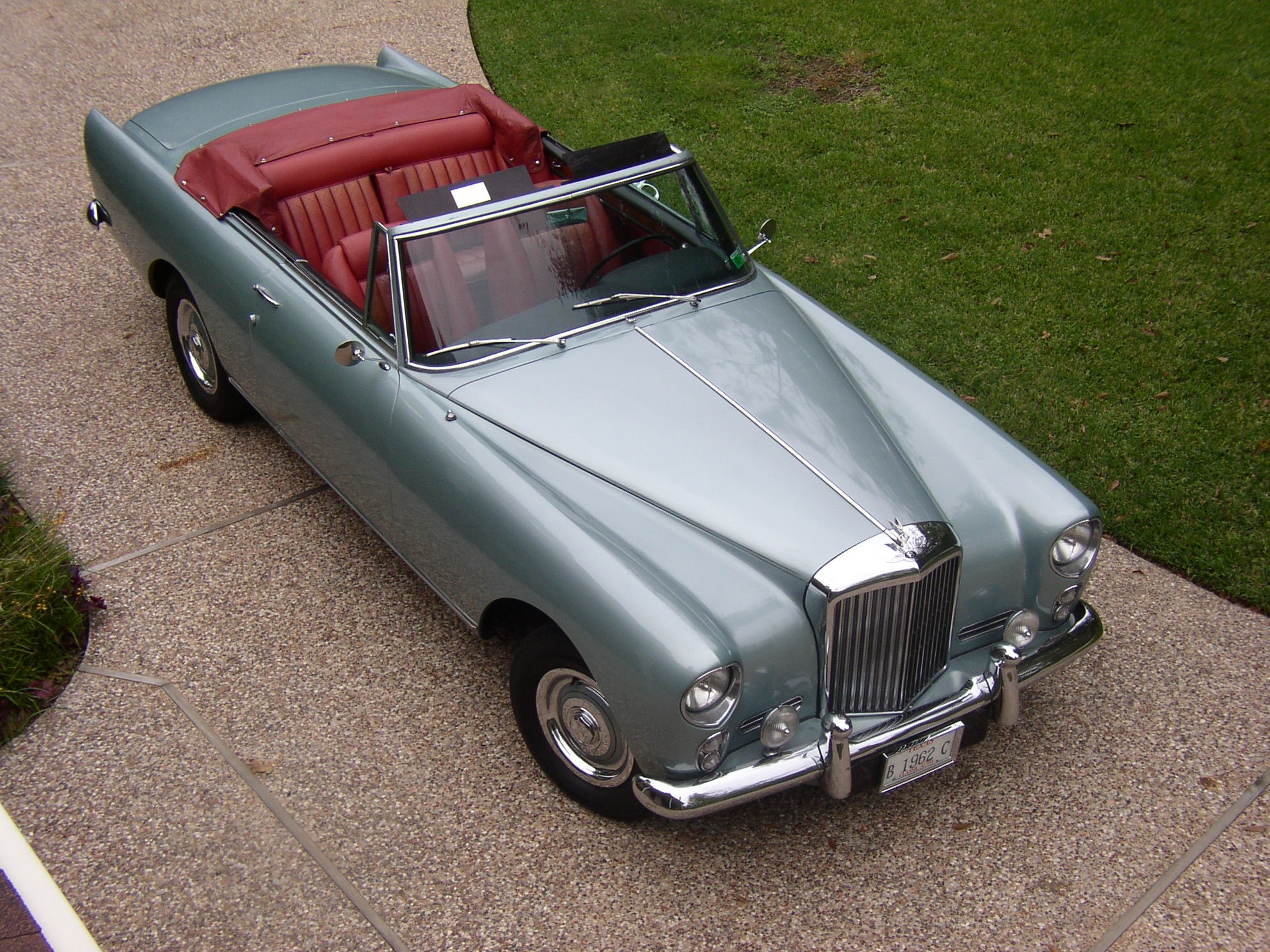
1962 Bentley Continental S2 cabriolet by Park Ward

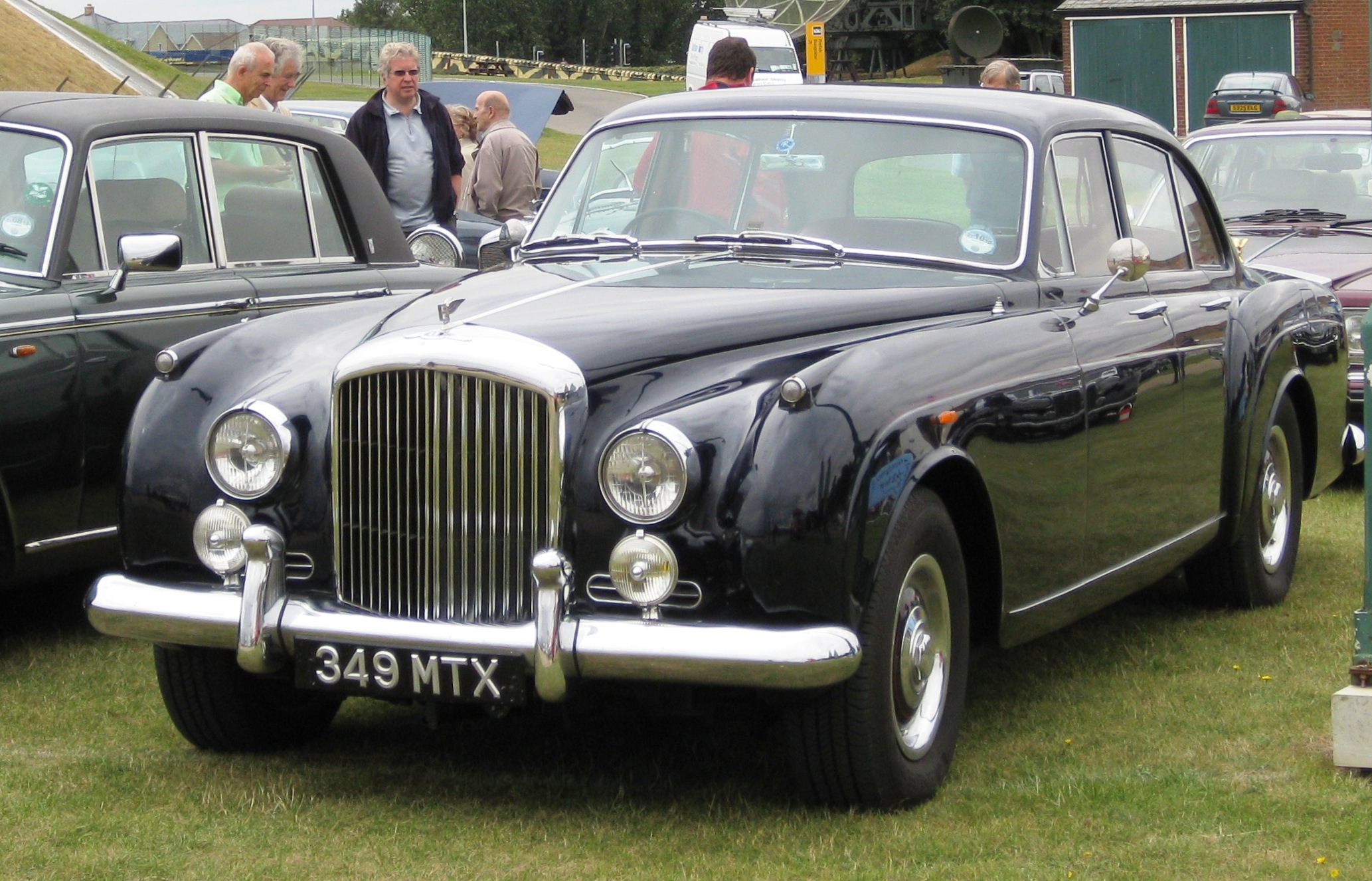
1961 Bentley Continental S2 4-door saloon Flying Spur by H J Mulliner

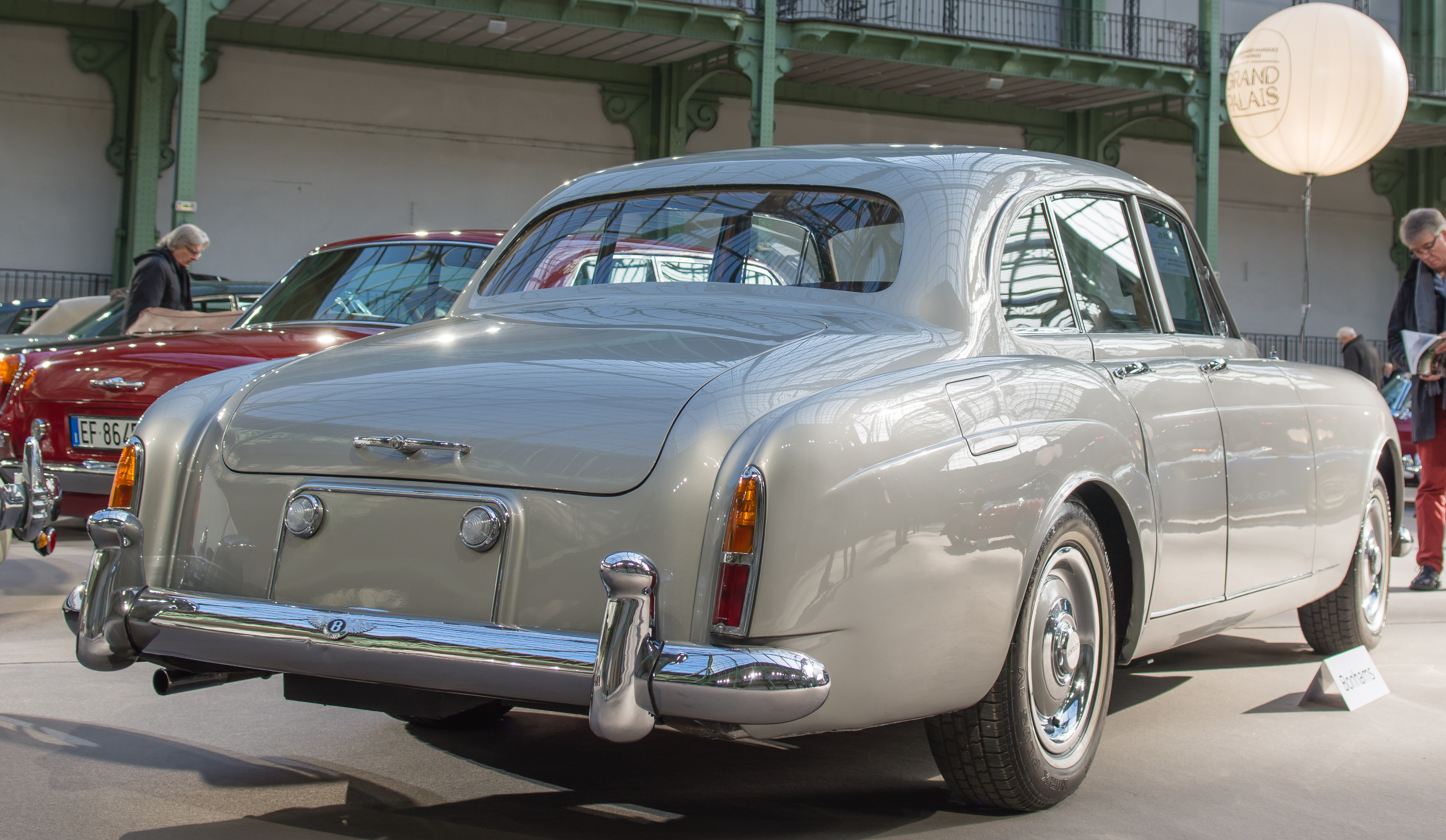
1959 Bentley Continental S2 4-door saloon Flying Spur by H J Mulliner

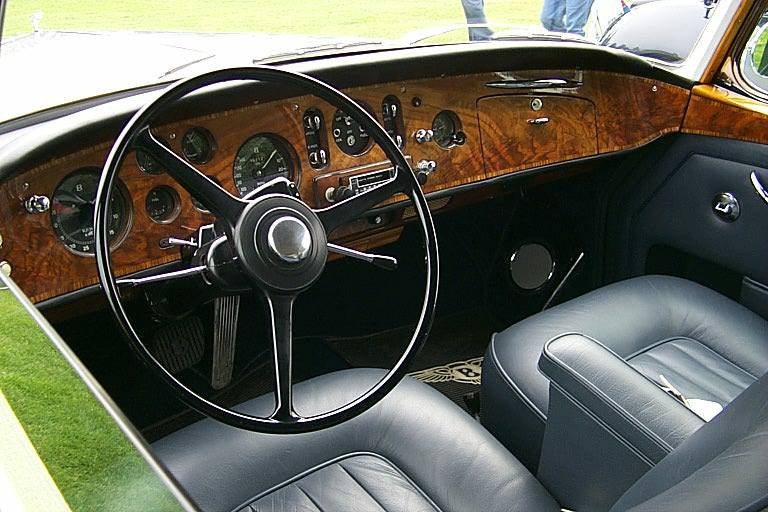
Bentley Continental S2 interior

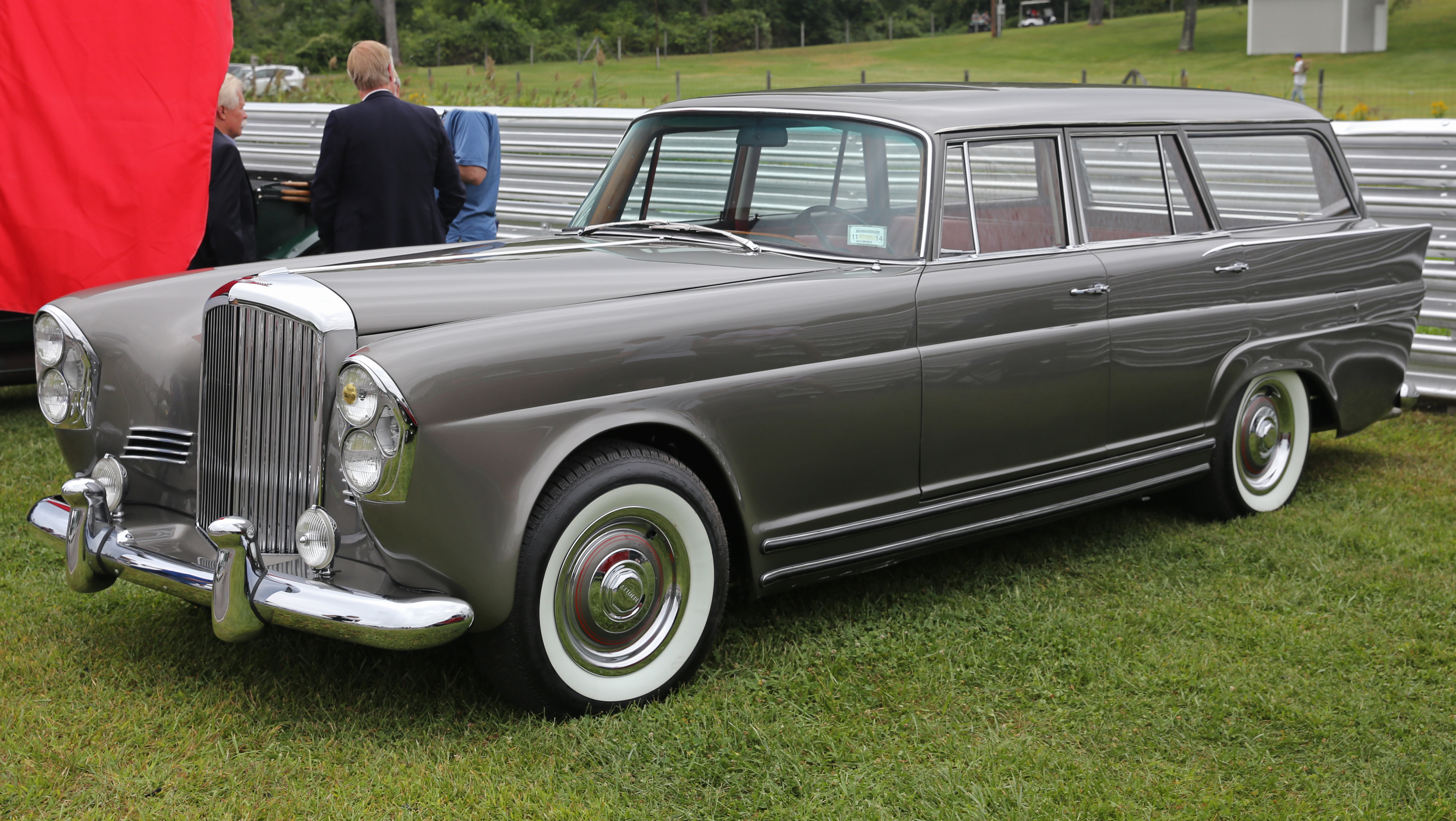
1960 Bentley S2 Shooting Brake by Wendler
