= Bentley R Type =

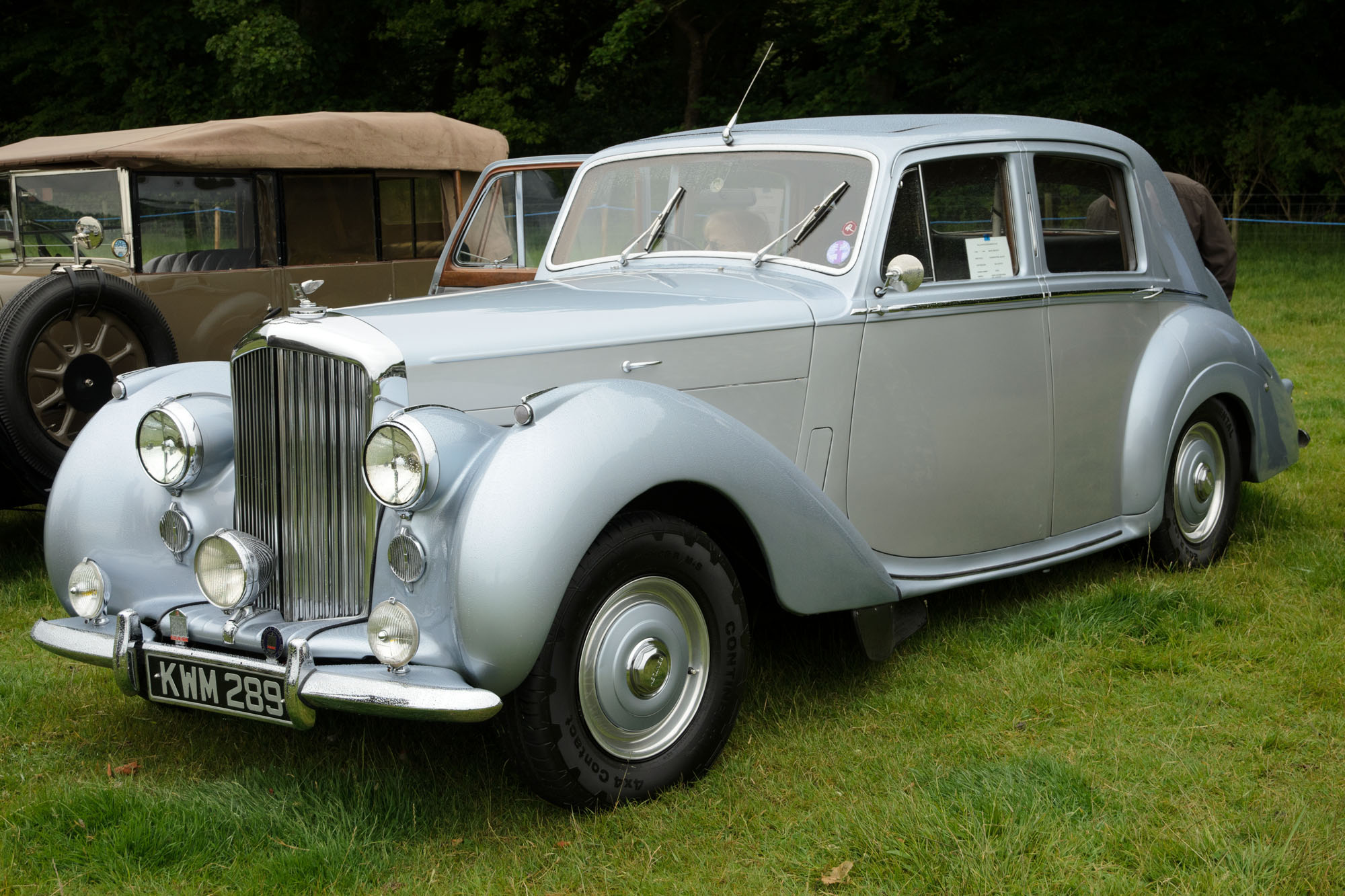
- 1955 R-Type standard steel sports saloon

Overview
- Manufacturer: Bentley Motors Limited (1931)
- Also called: Bentley Mark VII
- Production: 1952–1955; 2,323 built
- Assembly: United Kingdom: Crewe, England (Bentley Crewe)

Body and chassis
- Class: Luxury car
- Body style: Standard 4-door saloon; otherwise as arranged with coachbuilder by customer
- Layout: front engine, rear-wheel drive
- Related: Rolls-Royce Silver Dawn

Powertrain
- Engine: 4.6 L IOE I6; 130 hp (97 kW); estimate)
- Transmission: 4-speed manual with synchromesh; 4-speed Hydramatic automatic (optional from 1952)

Dimensions
- Wheelbase: 120 in (3,048 mm)
- Length: 200 in (5,080 mm)
- Width: 69 in (1,753 mm)
- Height: 64.5 in (1,638 mm)

Chronology
- Predecessor: Mark VI
- Successor: S1

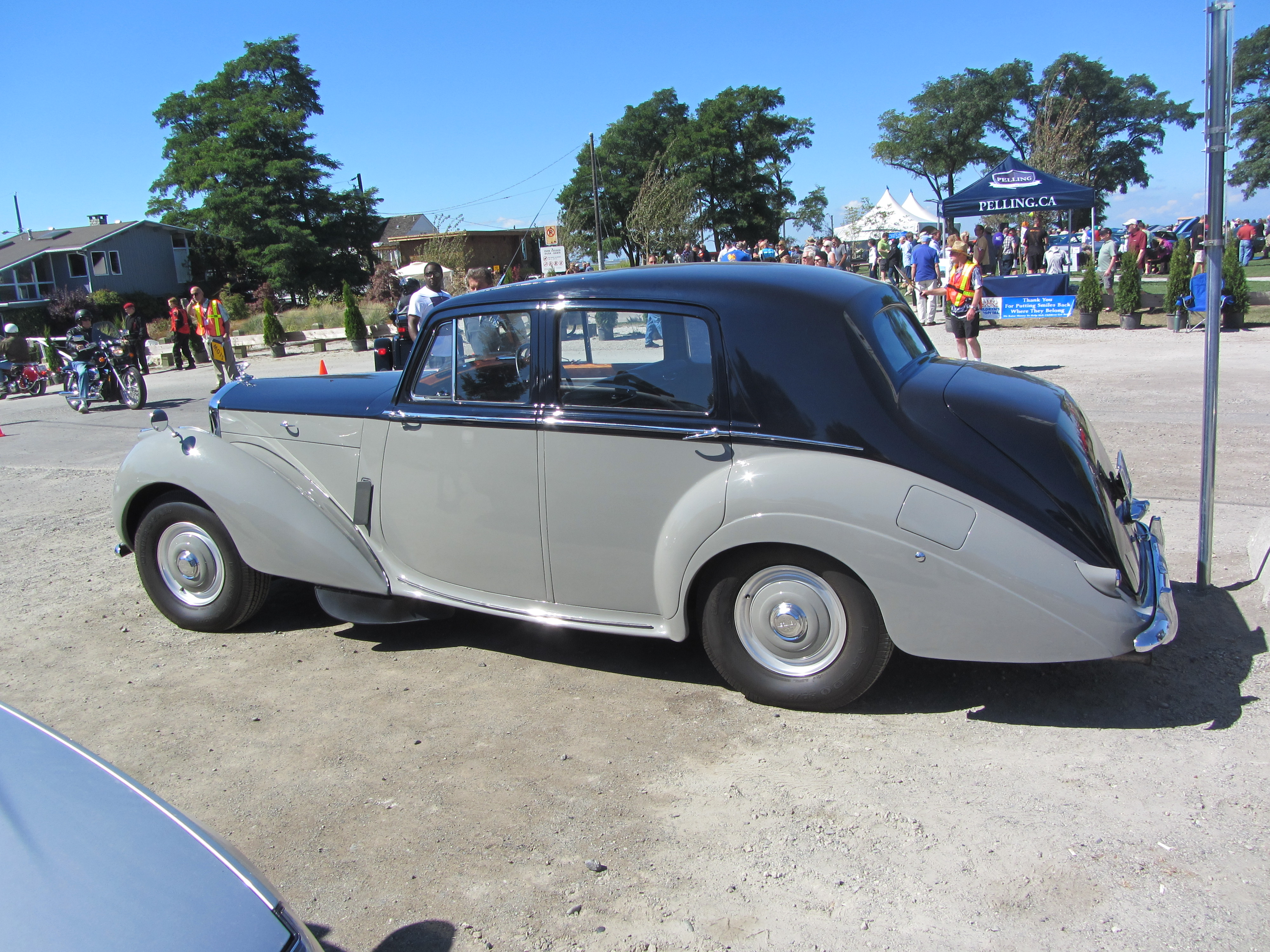
The big boot

The Bentley R Type is the second series of post-war Bentley automobiles, produced from 1952 to 1955 as the successor the Mark VI. Essentially a larger-boot version of the Mk VI, the R type is regarded by some as a stop-gap before the introduction of the S series cars in 1955. As with its predecessor, a standard body was available as well as coachbuilt versions by firms including H. J. Mulliner & Co., Park Ward, Harold Radford, Freestone and Webb, Carrosserie Worblaufen and others.

== Design ==
During development it was referred to as the Bentley Mark VII; the chassis cards for these cars describe them as Bentley 7. The R Type name which is now usually applied stems from chassis series RT. The front of the saloon model was identical to the Mark VI, but the boot (trunk) was almost doubled in capacity. The engine displacement was approximately 4½ litres, as fitted to later versions of the Mark VI. An automatic choke was fitted to the R-type's carburettor. The attachment of the rear springs to the chassis was altered in detail between the Mark VI and the R Type.

=== Running gear ===
All R Type models use an iron-block/aluminium-head straight-six engine fed by twin SU Type H6 carburettors. The basic engine displaced 4,566 cc (278.6 cu in) with a 92 mm (3.62 in) bore and 114.3 mm (4.50 in) stroke. A four-speed manual transmission was standard with a four-speed automatic option becoming standard on later cars.

=== Brakes and suspension ===
The suspension was independent at the front using coil springs with semi elliptic leaf springs at the rear. The brakes used 12.25 in (311 mm) drums all round and were operated hydraulically at the front and mechanically at the rear via a gearbox driven servo.

=== Coachbuilt examples ===
The first example is the standard steel saloon built by Bentley, but a number of customers opted for a bare chassis which was taken to a coachbuilder of their choice.

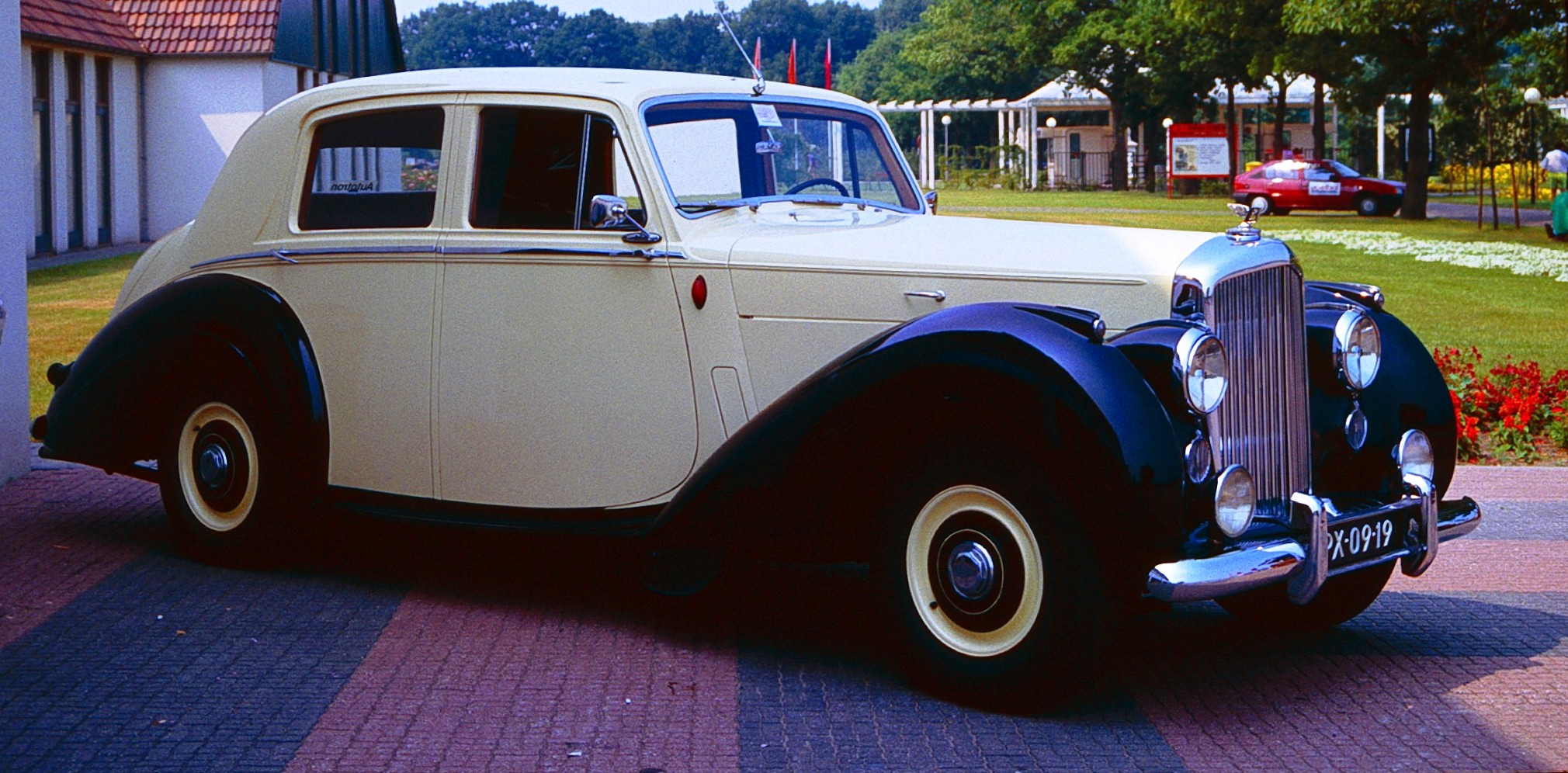
Standard steel
sports saloon

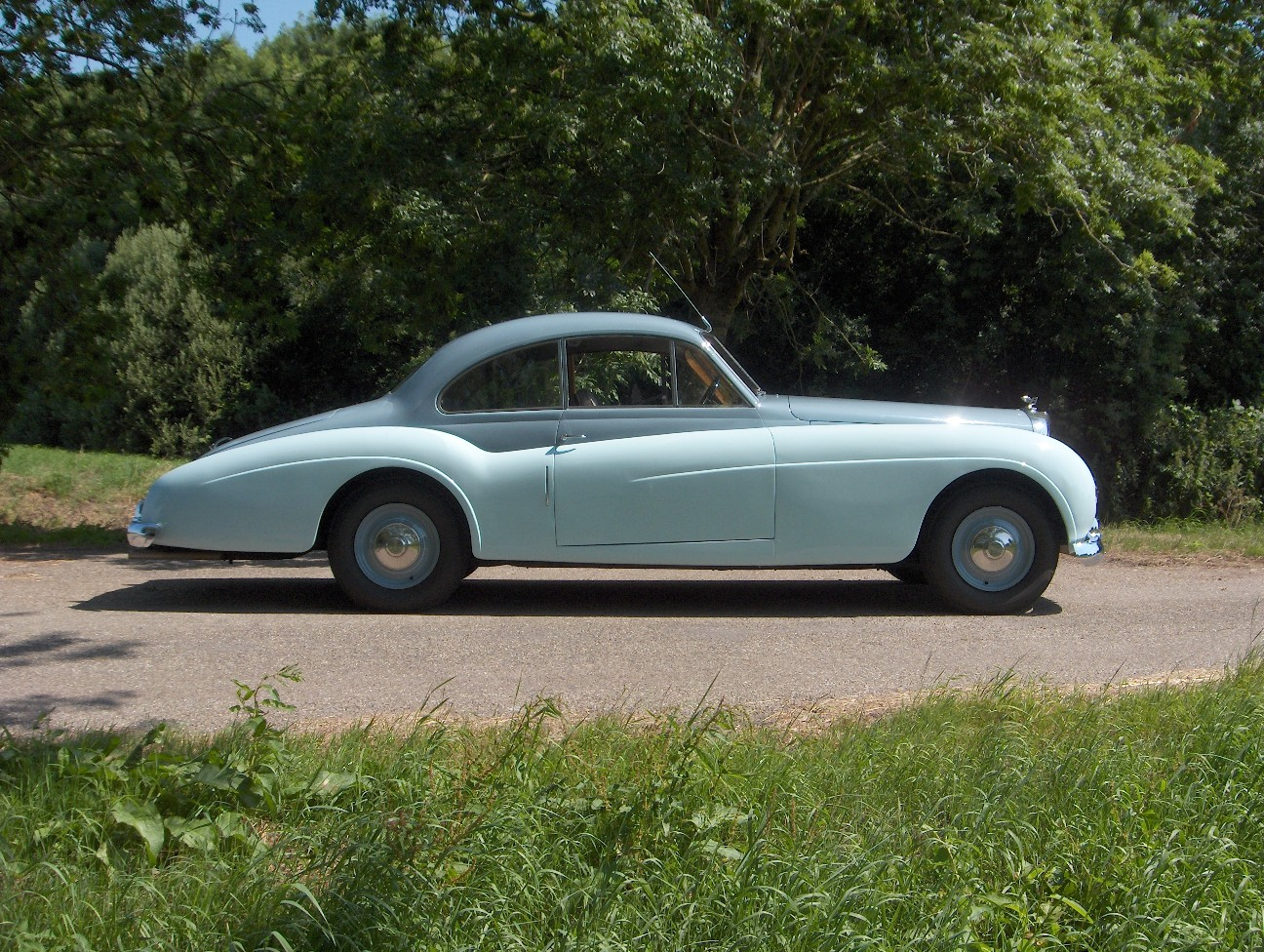
Abbott
fixed-head coupé

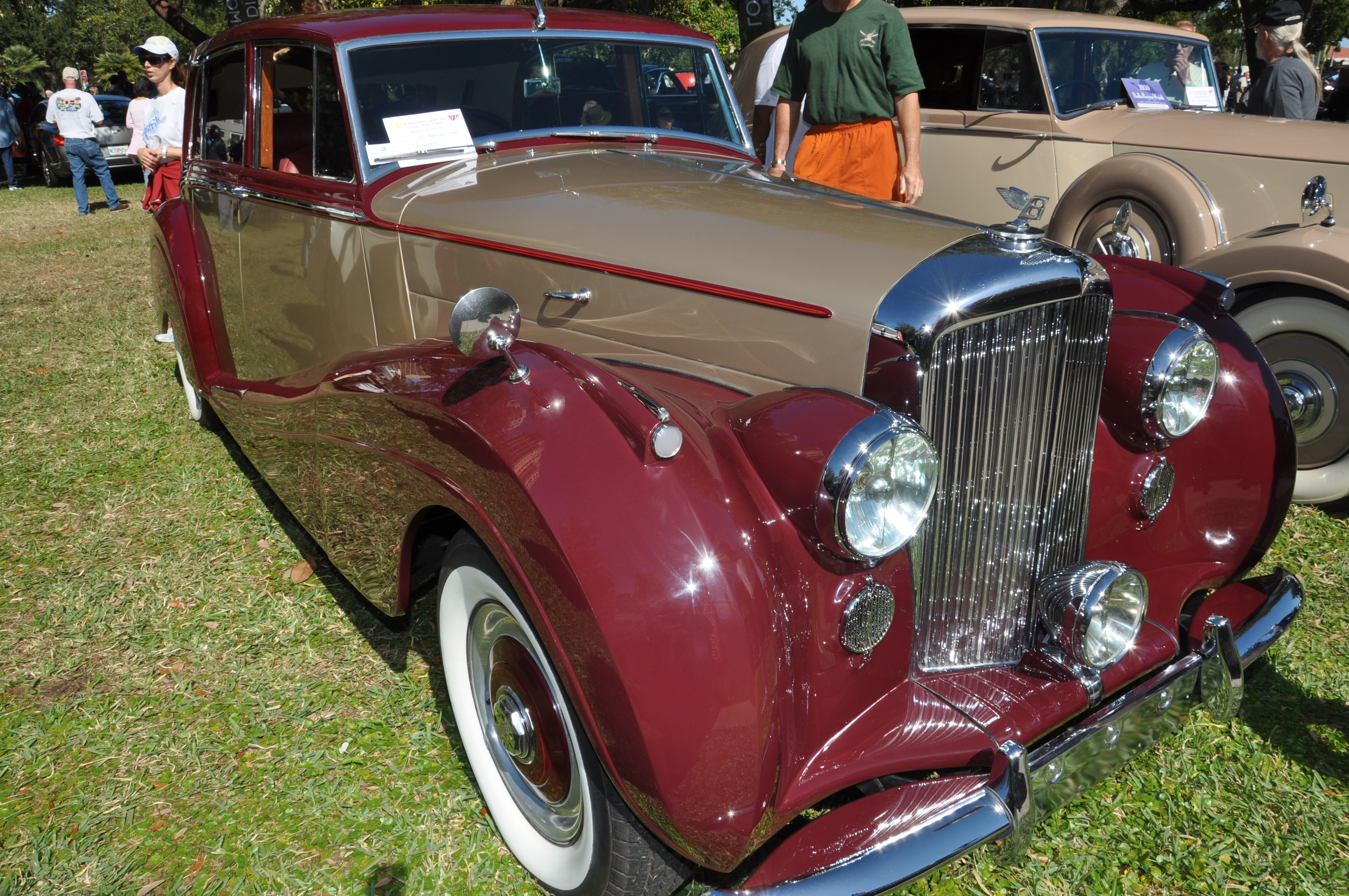
Freestone & Webb
sports saloon

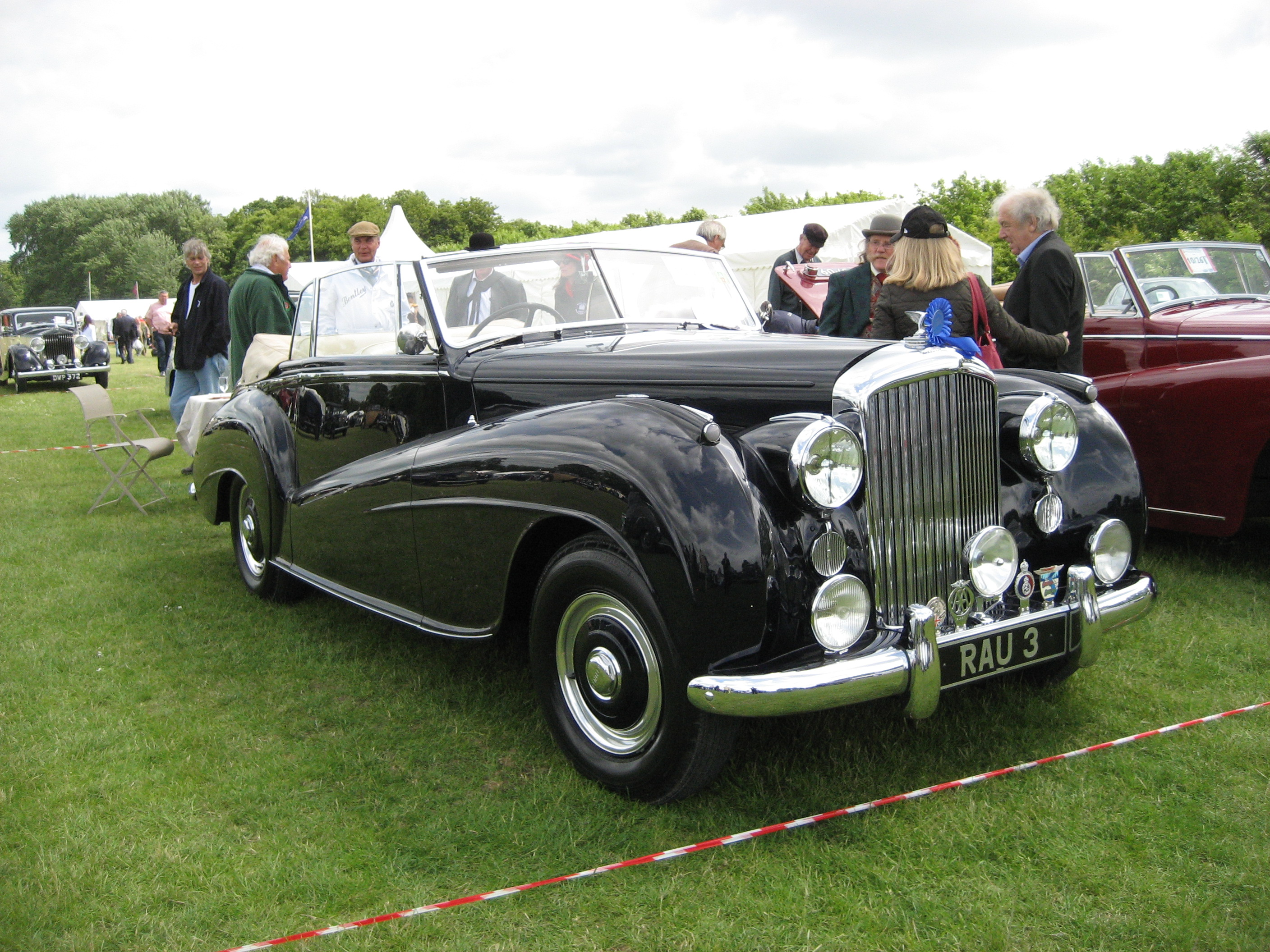
H J Mulliner
drop-head coupé

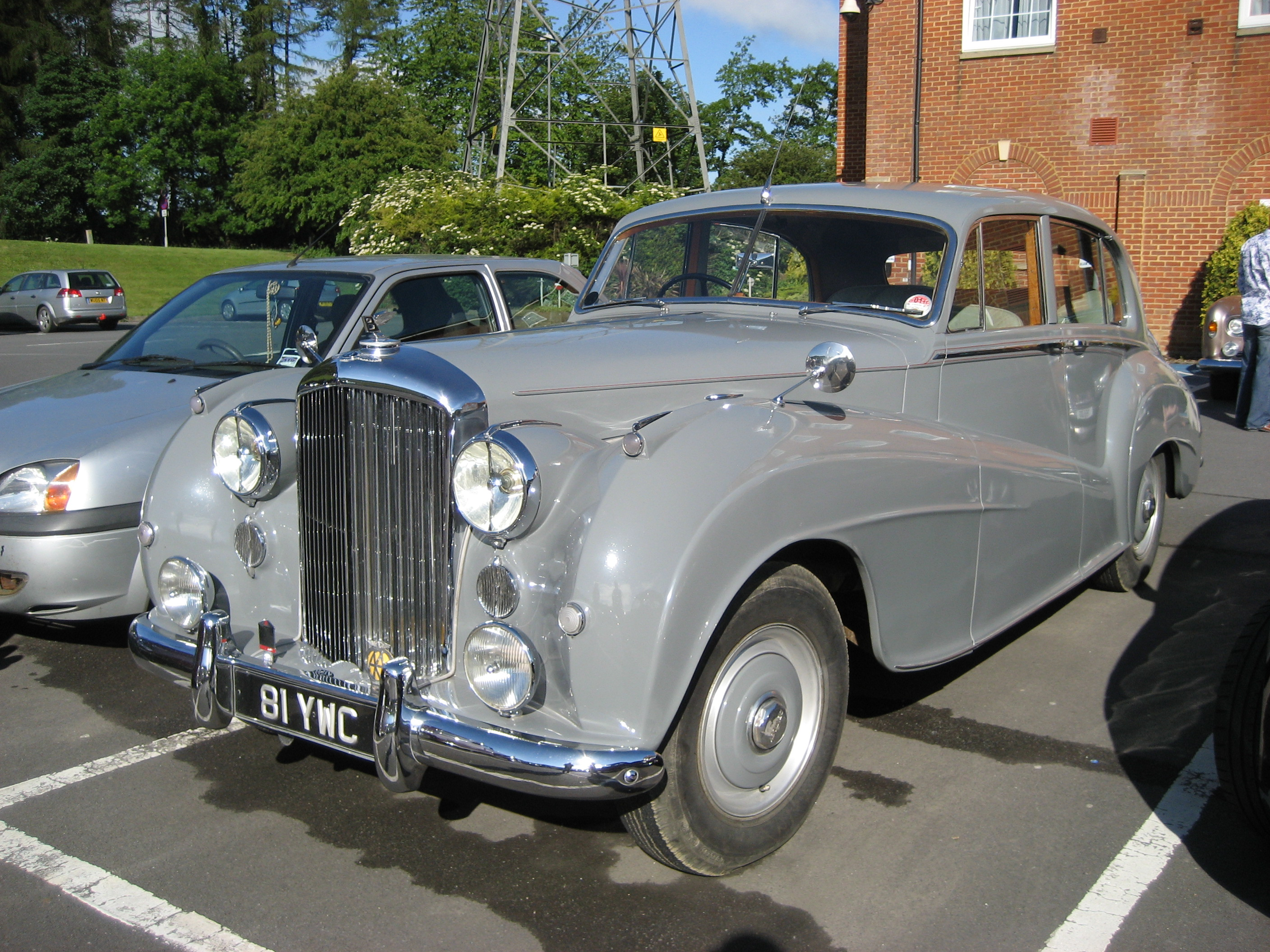
H J Mulliner
sports saloon

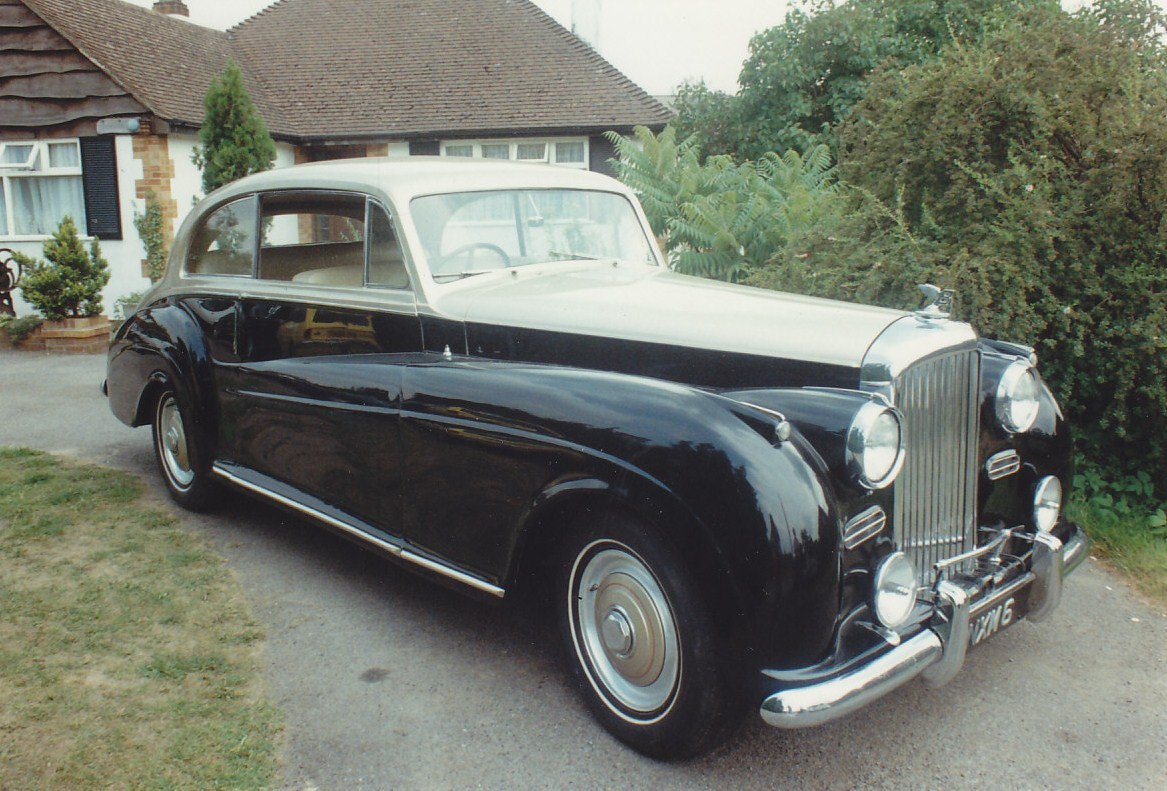
James Young
coupé

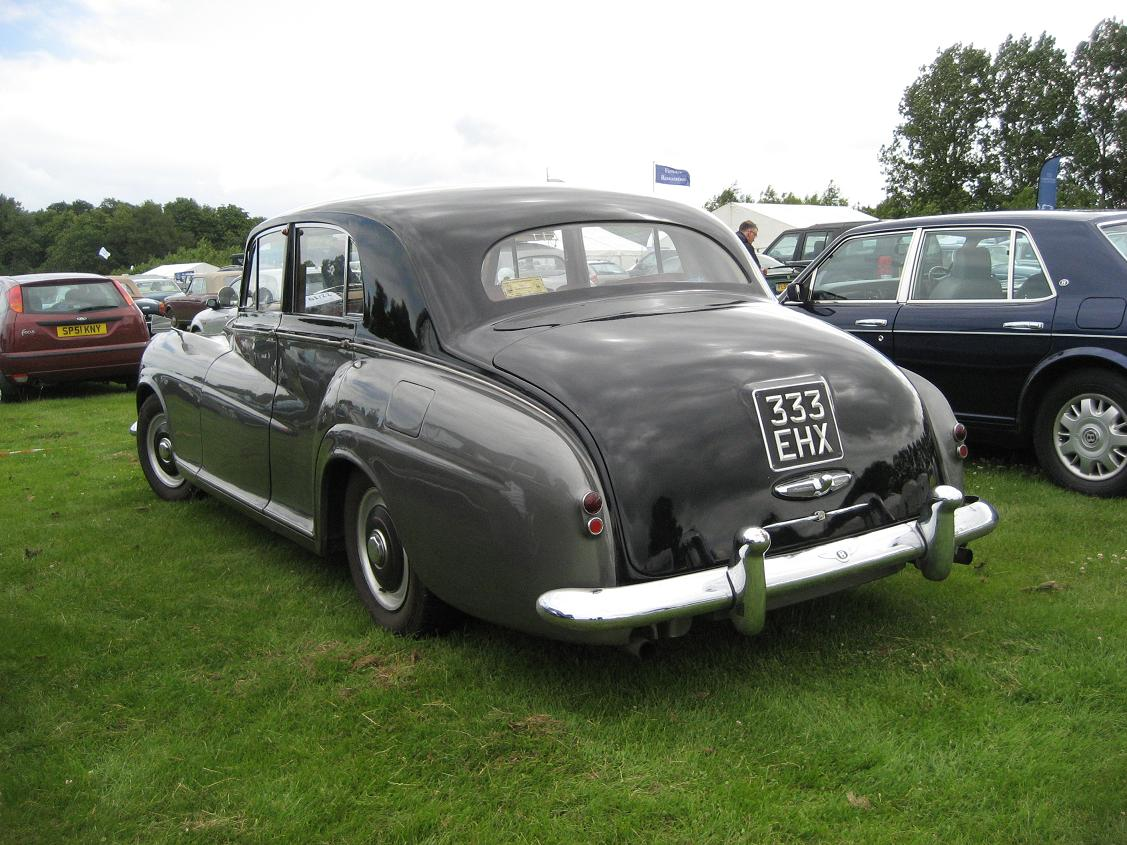
James Young
sports saloon

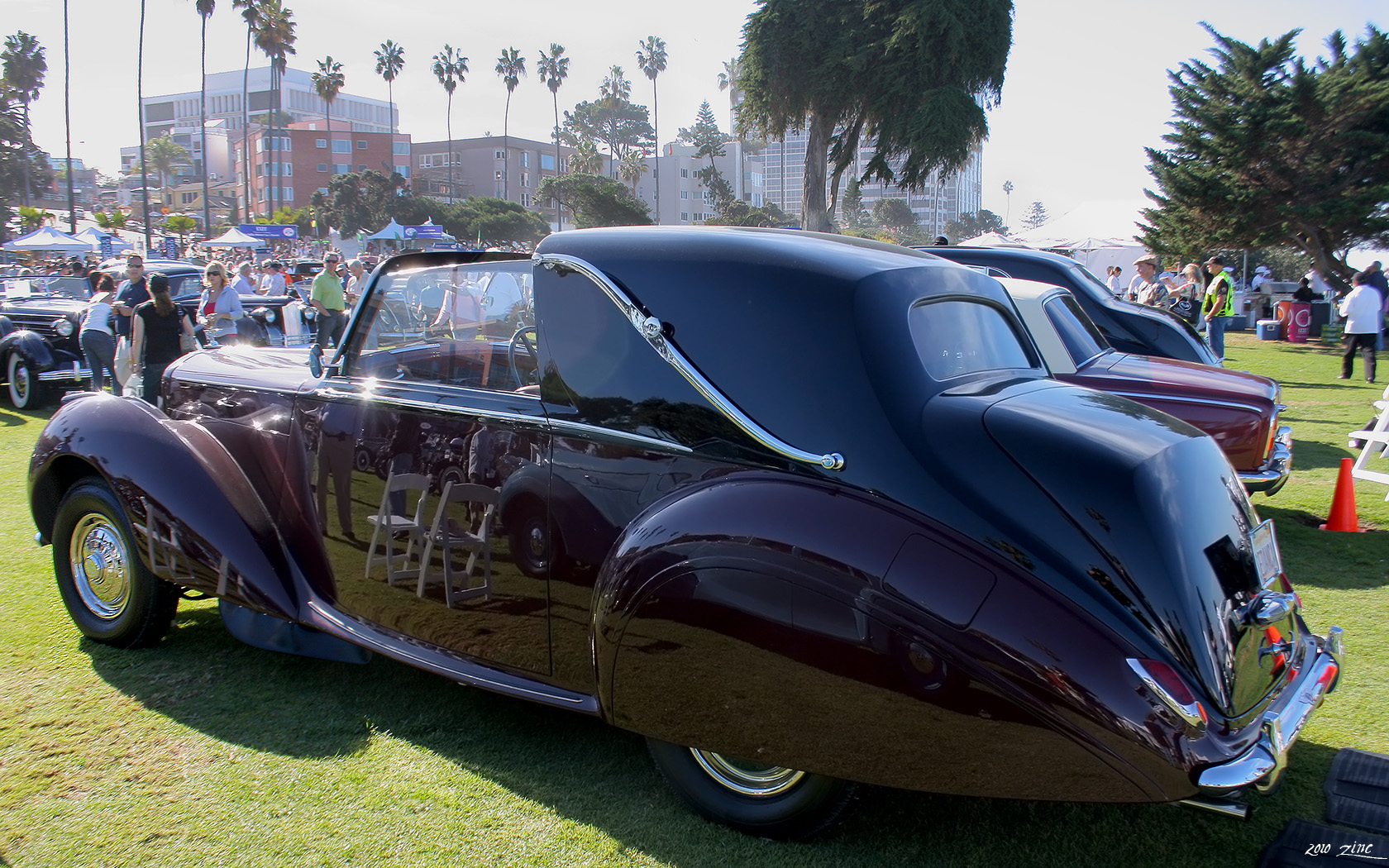
Park Ward
coupé de ville

== Performance ==
A four-door saloon with automatic transmission tested by the British magazine The Motor in 1953 had a top speed of 101.7 mph (163.7 km/h) and could accelerate from 0-60 mph (97 km/h) in 13.25 seconds. A fuel consumption of 15.5 miles per imperial gallon (18.2 L/100 km; 12.9 mpg_{‑US}) was recorded. The test car cost £4481 including taxes.

== R-Type Continental ==
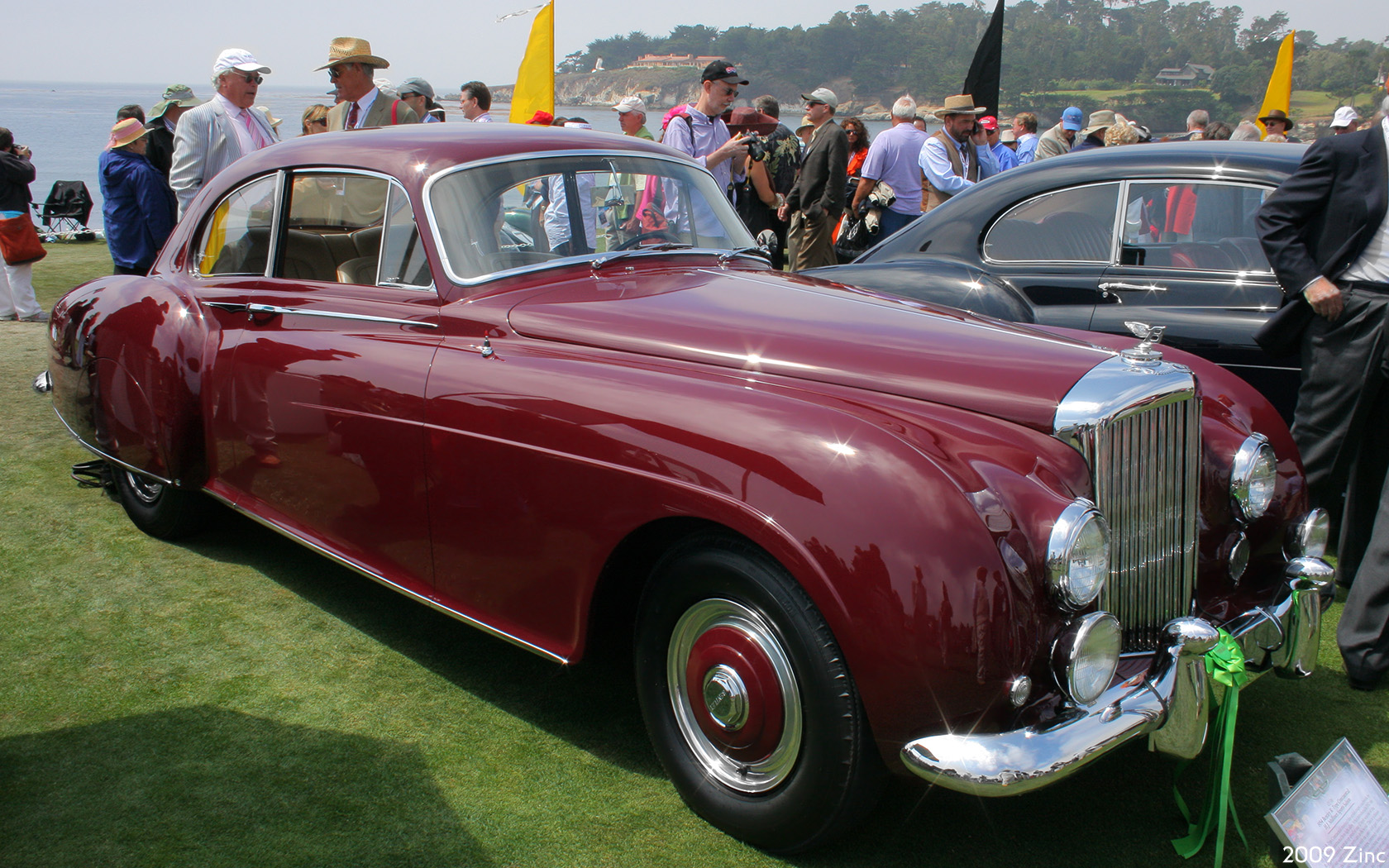
Continental coupé by H. J. Mulliner

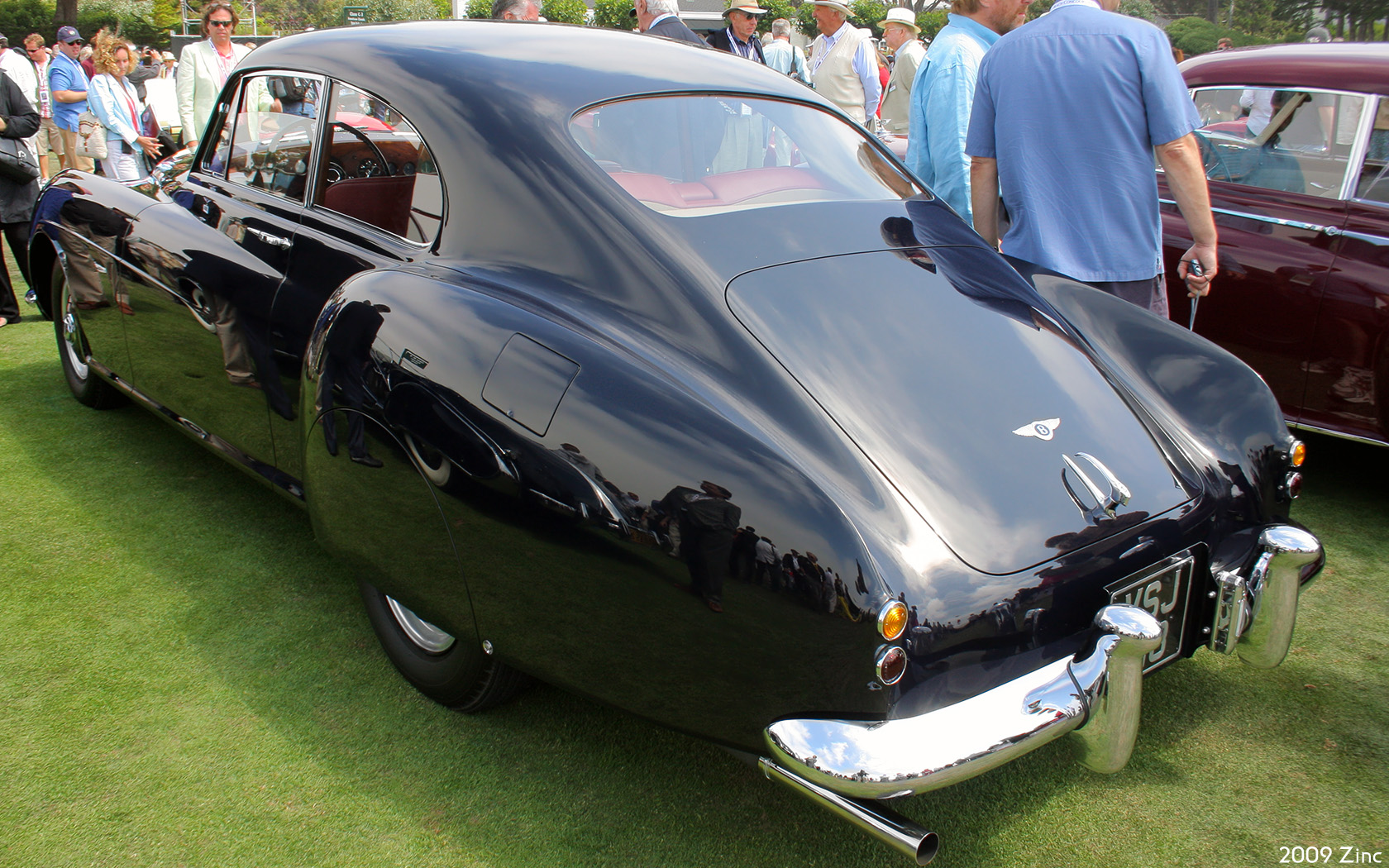
Continental coupé by H. J. Mulliner

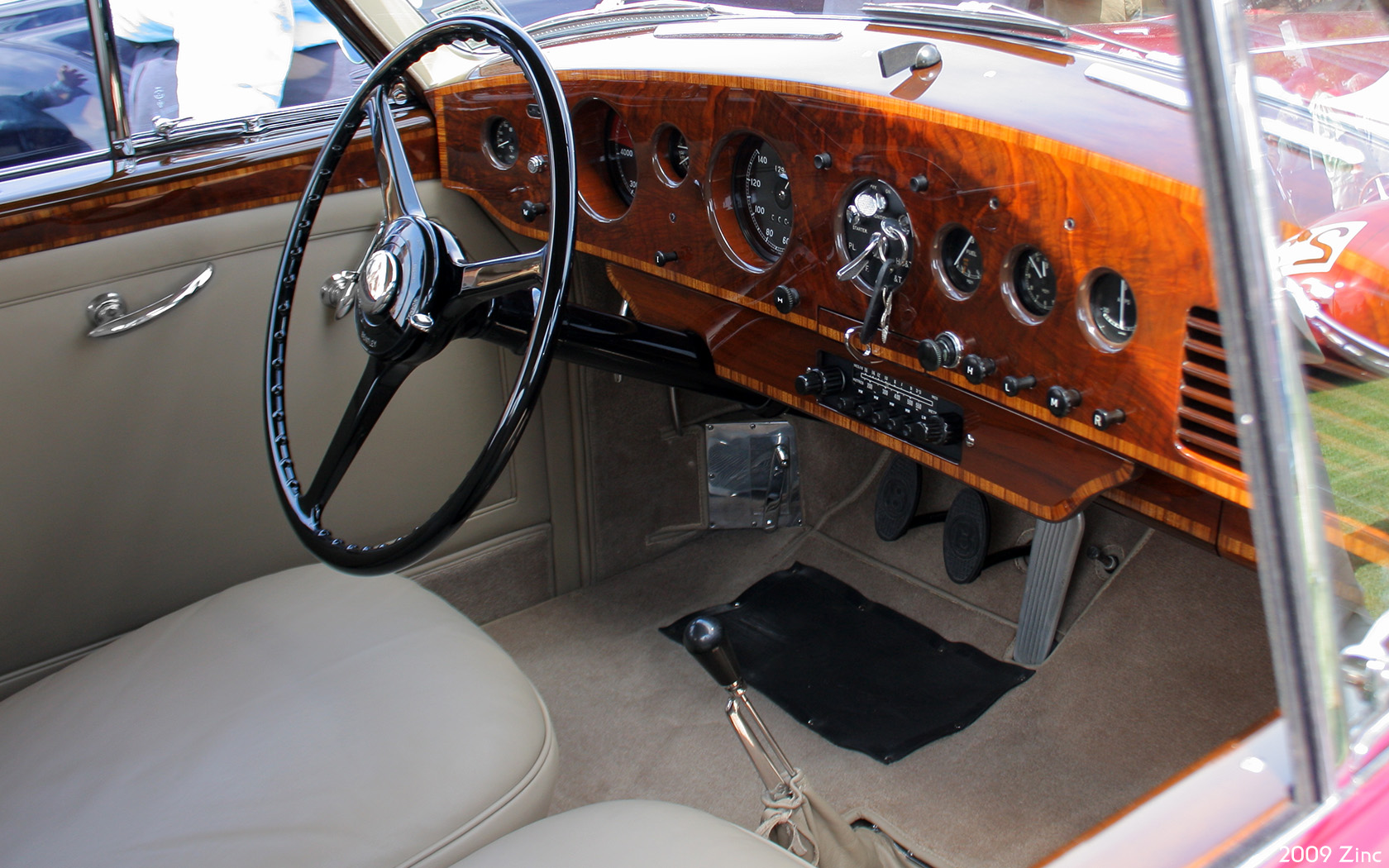
Interior of red Continental coupé by H. J. Mulliner above

The R-Type Continental was a high-performance version of the R-Type. It was the fastest four-seat car in production at the time.

The prototype was developed by a team of designers and engineers from Rolls-Royce Ltd. and coachbuilder H. J. Mulliner & Co. led by Rolls-Royce's Chief Project Engineer, Ivan Evernden. Rolls-Royce worked with H. J. Mulliner instead of their own coachbuilding subsidiary Park Ward because the former had developed a lightweight body construction system using metal throughout instead of the traditional ash-framed bodies.

The styling, finalised by Stanley Watts of H. J. Mulliner, was influenced by aerodynamic testing conducted at Rolls-Royce's wind tunnel by Evernden's assistant, Milford Read. The rear fins stabilised the car at speed and made it resistant to changes in direction due to crosswinds.

A maximum kerb weight of 34 long hundredweight (1,700 kg; 3,800 lb) was specified to keep the tyres within a safe load limit at a top speed of 120 mph (190 km/h).

The prototype, with chassis number 9-B-VI and registration number OLG-490, which earned it the nickname "Olga", was on the road by August 1951. Olga and the first series of production Continentals were based on the Mark VI chassis, and used a manual mixture control on the steering wheel boss, as these versions did not have an automatic choke.

The early R Type Continental has essentially the same engine as the standard R Type, but with modified carburation, induction and exhaust manifolds along with higher gear ratios. The compression ratio was raised to 7.25:1 from the standard 6.75:1, while the final gear ratio was raised (lowered numerically) from 3.41 to 3.07.

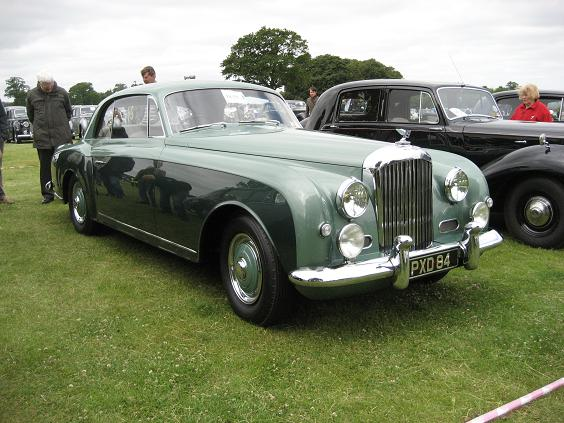
Continental coupé by Park Ward

Despite its name, the two-door Continental was produced principally for the domestic home market, most of the 207 cars produced were right-hand drive, with 43 left-hand drive examples produced for use abroad. The chassis was produced at the Rolls-Royce Crewe factory and shared many components with the standard R type. R-Type Continentals were delivered as rolling chassis to the coachbuilder of choice. Coachwork for most of these cars was completed by H. J. Mulliner & Co. who mainly built them in fastback coupe form. Other coachwork came from Park Ward (London) who built six, later including a drophead coupe version. Franay (Paris) built five, Graber (Wichtrach, Switzerland) built three, one of them later altered by Köng (Basel, Switzerland), and Pininfarina made one. James Young (London) built in 1954 a Sports Saloon for the owner of the company, James Barclay.

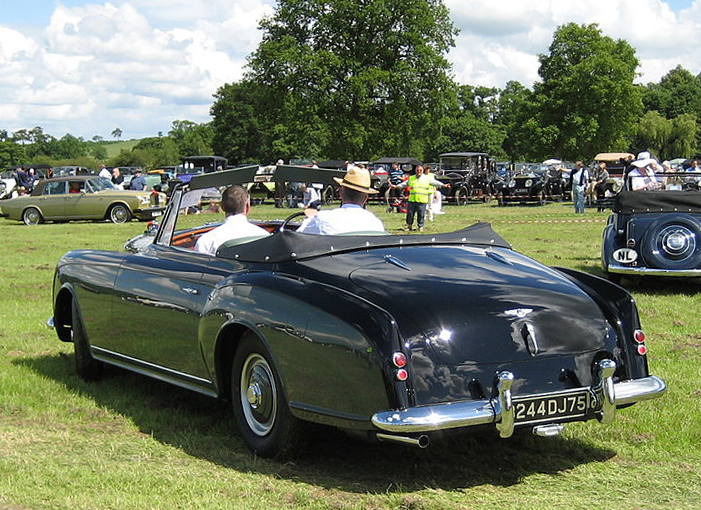
Continental drophead coupé by Park Ward

After July 1954, the model was fitted with an engine with a larger bore of 94.62 mm (3.7 in), giving a total displacement of 4.9 L (4887 cc/298 in³).

The rarity of the R Type Continental has made the car valuable to car collectors. In 2015 a 1952 R Type Continental, in unrestored condition, sold for over $1 million USD.

== Other uses ==
The Bentley R Type Gooda Special (chassis no. B77ZX) is a period-modified racing variant of the R Type featuring a streamlined aluminium body. B77ZX originally left the factory in 1954 as a standard steel-bodied saloon, not a Continental model, as commonly reported.

Period documentation suggests that prior to being rebodied, B77ZX was used as a trials car. Speculation suggests that during this time, it may have been rolled, following which a decision was made not to repair the standard saloon body, but to create a new race-oriented one.

=== Peel Coachworks rebody ===
In 1966, then-owner Robert (Bob) Gooda (c.1908–1973) commissioned Peel Coachworks of Kingston-upon-Thames to rebody the car for competitive use. The firm produced an aluminium body featuring a more streamlined roofline, a radiator grille lowered by four inches, and a redesigned front end inspired by the more contemporary Rolls-Royce Silver Cloud III, replacing the car’s somewhat dated original bodywork. The new body reduced the weight from 1880 kg to 1549 kg and raised the top speed from 106 mph to an estimated 120 mph, a significant improvement.

The newly dubbed “Gooda Special” made its competition debut in August 1967 in a five-lap Bentley Drivers’ Club handicap race at Silverstone, driven by Brian Dumps, who co-owned the car with Gooda. However, the car did not make the end of the race.

=== Post Gooda-Dumps ownership ===
During the decades following Gooda and Dumps’ joint ownership, exact records of the car’s whereabouts are unclear.

During the 1970s, the Gooda Special was sold and exported to the United States, where it made a brief background appearance in an episode of the detective television series, Vegas.

According to Ray Roberts’ book Bentley Specials & Special Bentleys, the Gooda Special was back in Britain in April 1990, when it was offered for sale by Straight Eight Ltd of London. Whether through that firm or other means, the car returned to America where as of 2008 it was owned by Terry O’Reilly, and entered into various concourse and road-rally events.

In 2009, the Gooda Special was sold through Bonhams. In 2014, it competed in the Tony Gaze Trophy at the 72nd Goodwood Members’ Meeting, the car’s first race since its Silverstone debut in 1967.

== Production numbers ==
- R Type: 2323 (295 with coachbuilt bodies)
- R Type Continental: 208 (including the prototype)
