= James Young (coachbuilder) =

British coachbuilding company

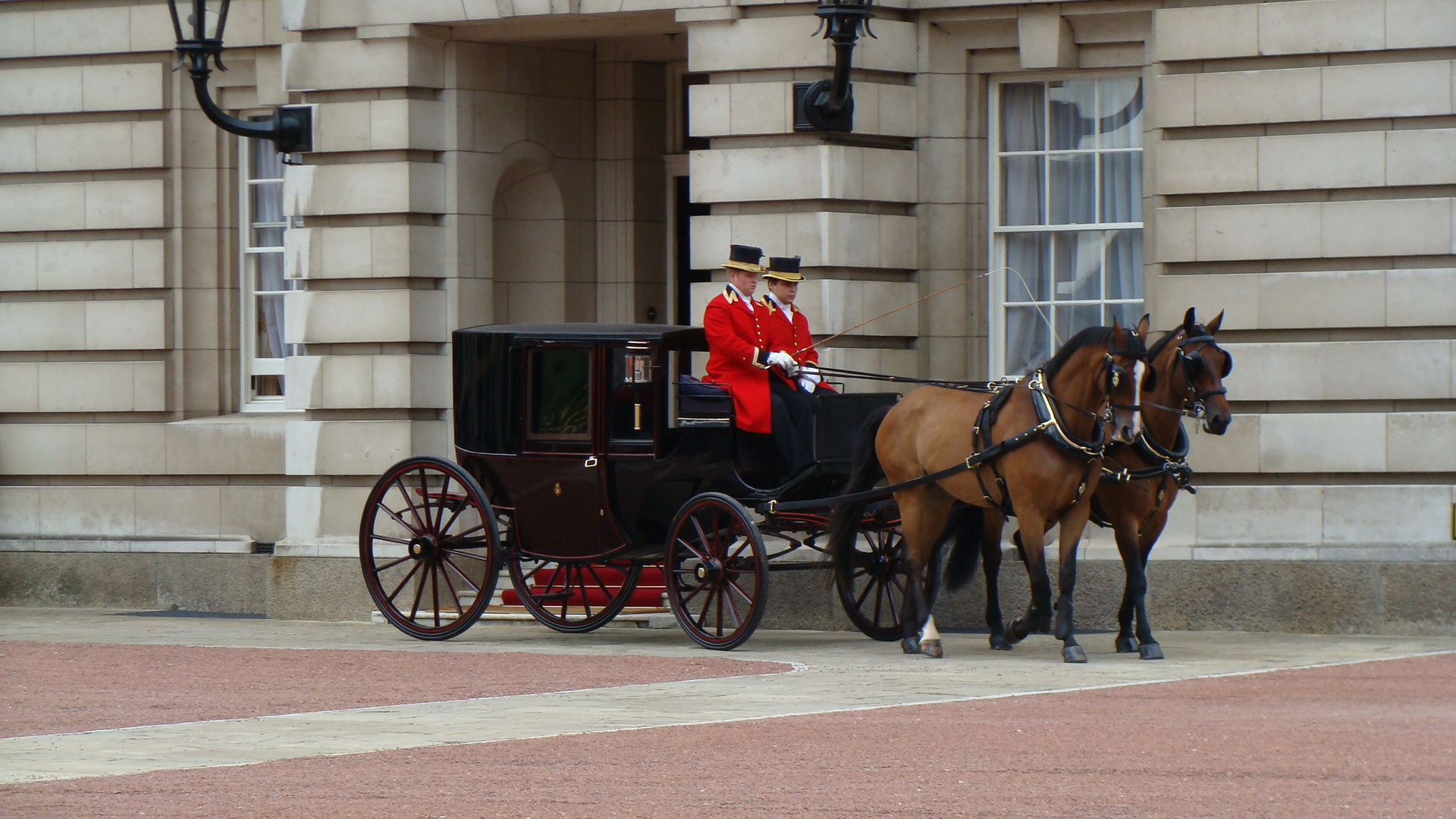
Brougham carriage by James Young

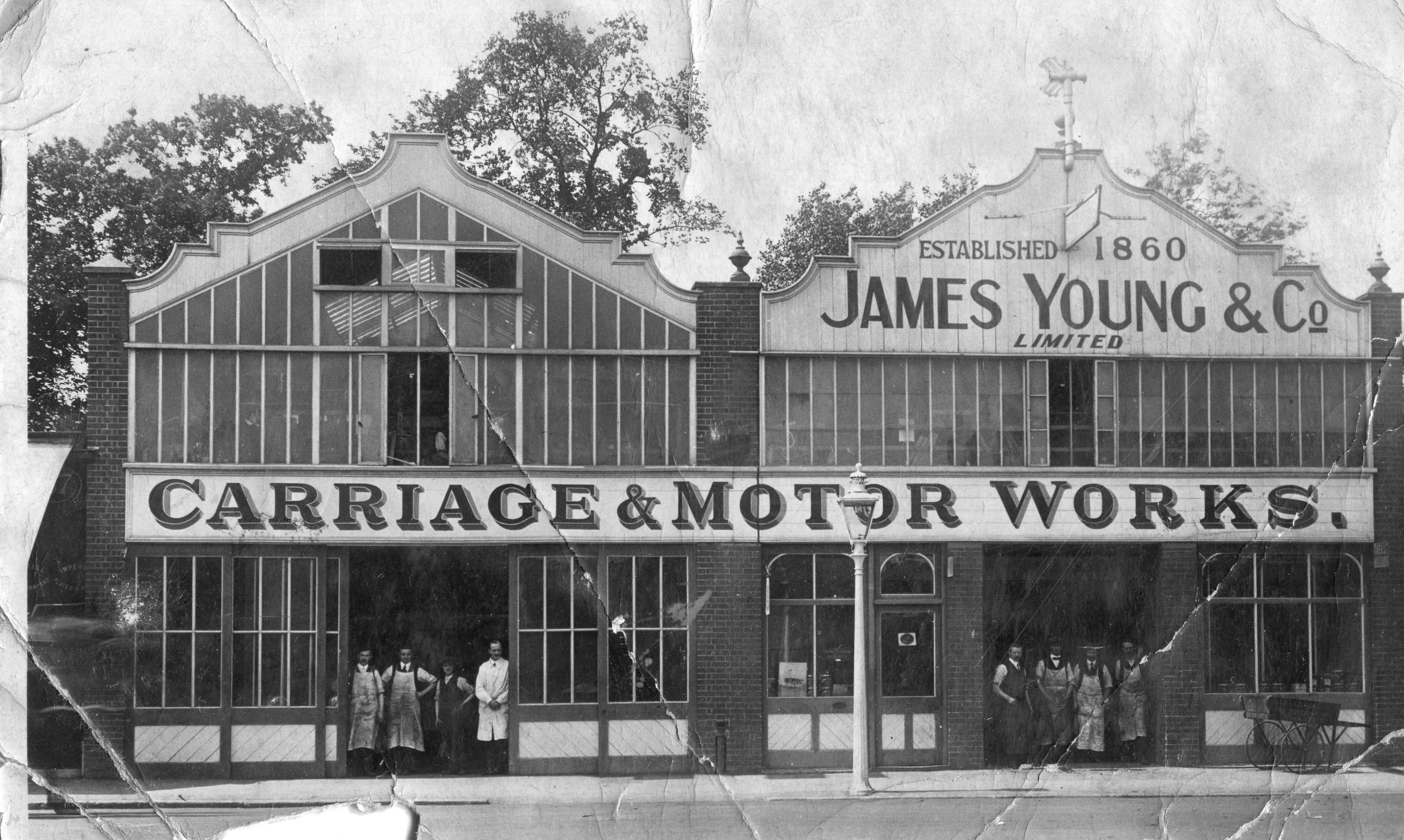

James Young Limited was a top class British coachbuilding business in London Road, Bromley, England.

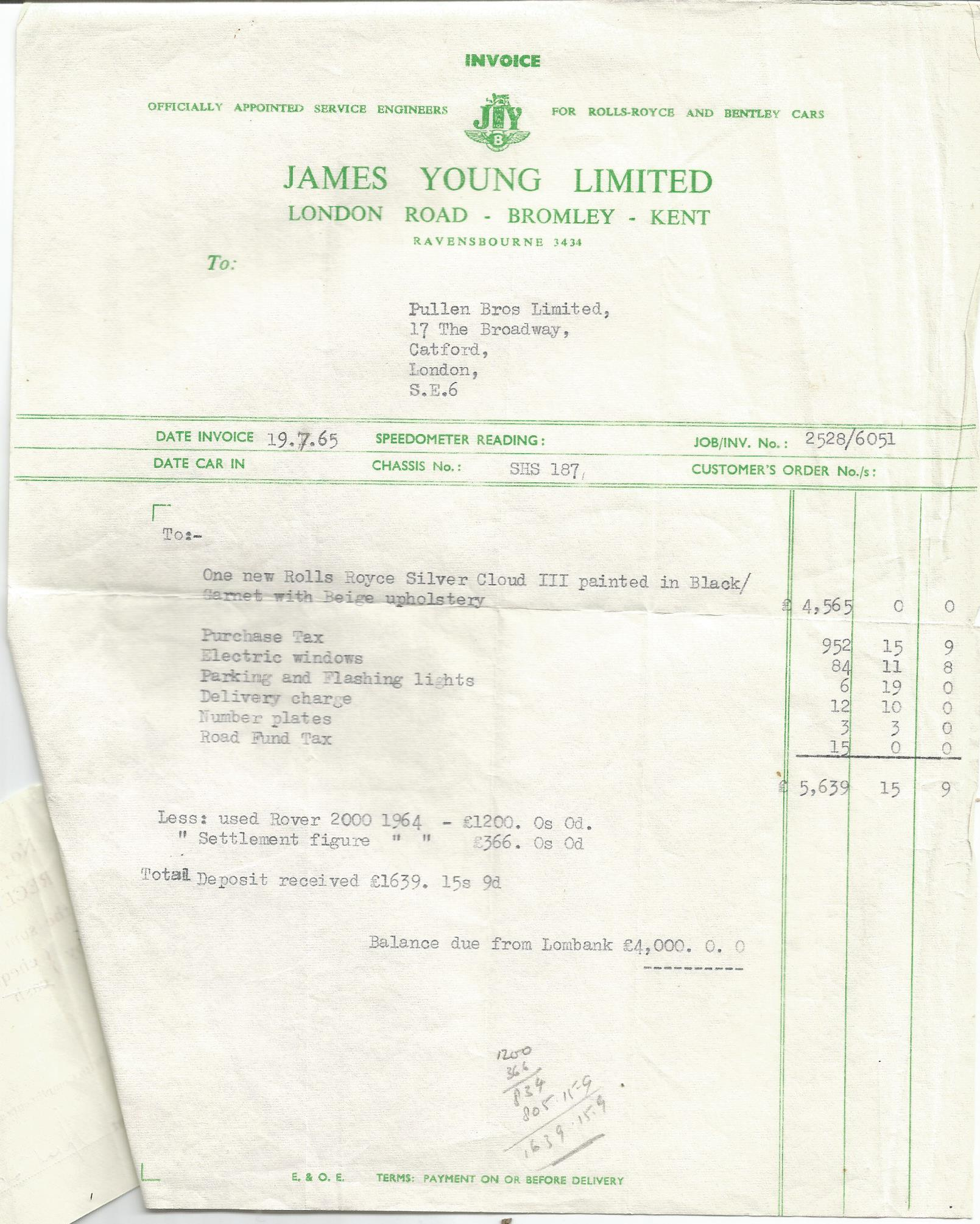
James Young Coachbuilder receipt for Rolls-Royce

James Young bought J. K. Hunter's business in 1863. It built a full range of high quality carriages including landaus but was most famous in James Young's time for its lightweight Bromley Brougham.

Their first car body was made in 1908 on a Wolseley chassis for the local Member of Parliament. During the First World War they made ambulances, lorries and armoured cars on Darracq and Hudson chassis. In the 1920s and early 1930s standardised bodies were built for Sunbeam and Talbot along with individual commissions often on Bentley and Rolls-Royce chassis.

James Young Limited joined the Society of Motor Manufacturers and Traders in 1922 and first set up their own stand at the SMMT's 1925 London Motor Show at Olympia. They displayed two bodies: a Chrysler all-weather and a Lanchester saloon.

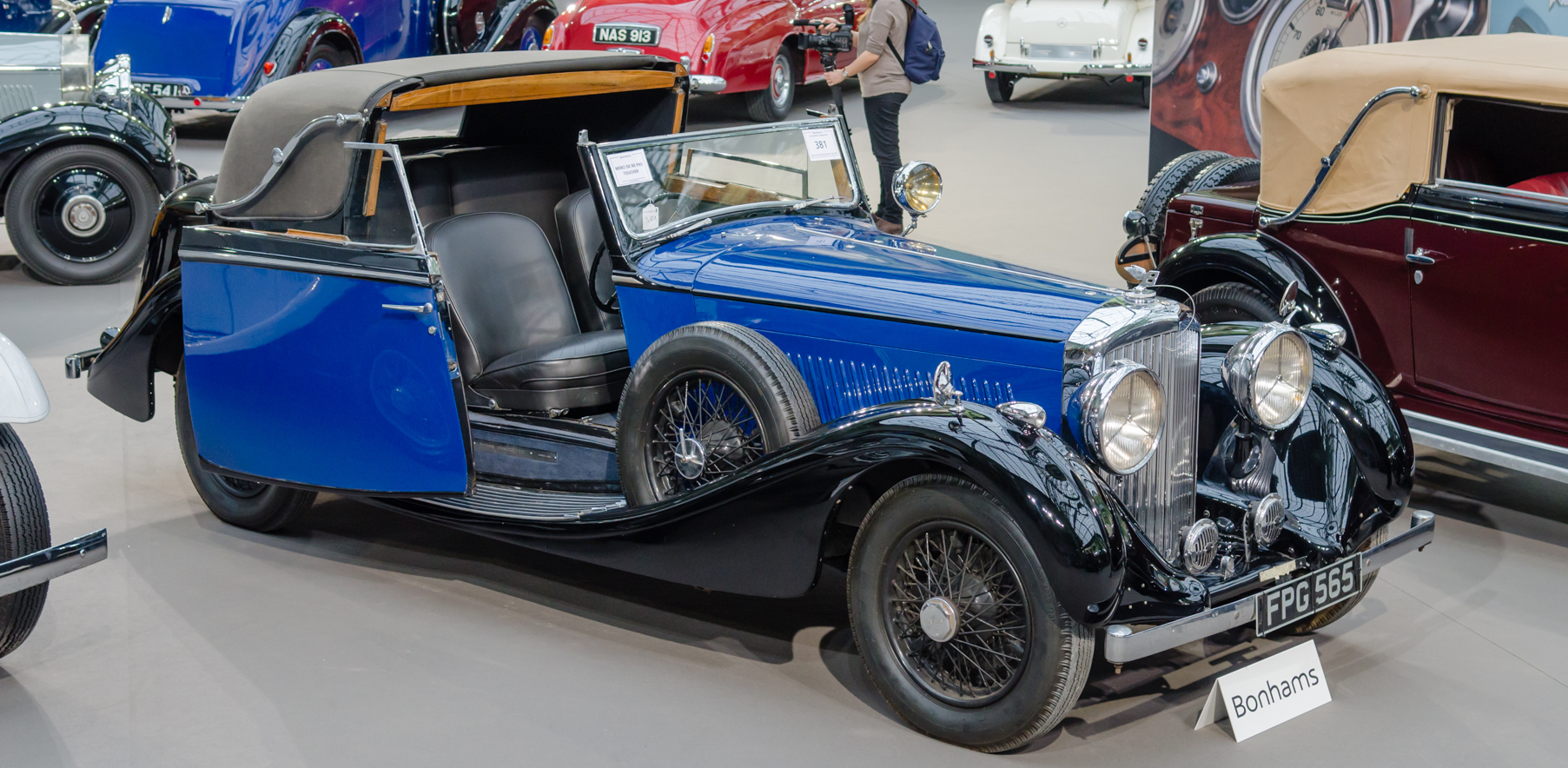

Employees invented and patented a new way to make roofs that did not make a drumming noise.

They also patented a way to make bodies with parallel opening doors.

They made bodies for Bentleys, Rolls-Royce Phantom III's, Wraiths and Silver Wraiths.

In 1937 James Young was bought by London Rolls-Royce dealer Jack Barclay and he persuaded Scotsman A. F. McNeil (1891–1965), 'Mac', to leave J Gurney Nutting & Co to become James Young's chief designer. These two events combined with the end of the depression to produce a sharp rise in James Young's sales.

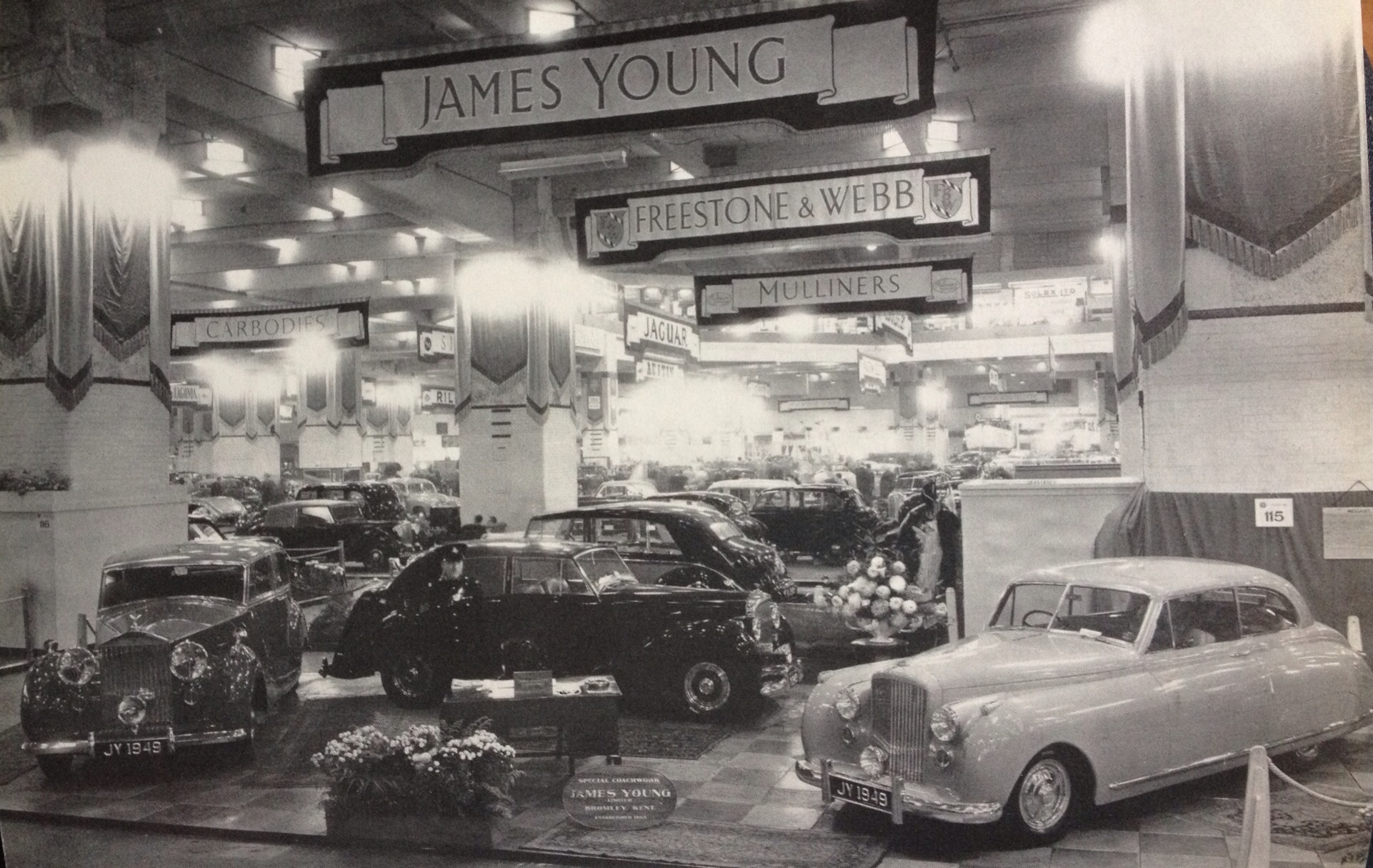
Earls Court motor show 1948

During the Second World War James Young built aircraft components, mobile canteens and canvas covers. The factory was destroyed and all records were lost in 1941, the second year of the Blitz. Rebuilt, it was hit again, this time by a V-1 flying bomb but production continued.

Coachbuilding resumed after the war and a stand was taken at the 1948 Motor Show. By the early 1960s 50 or 60 new bodies were being built each year mostly for export. By that time the only Bentley bodies were for Continentals, the last S3 Continental went to its owner in early 1966. Mac McNeil died in 1965.

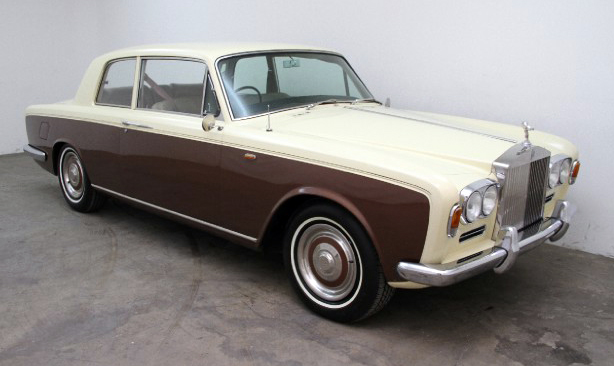
James Young version

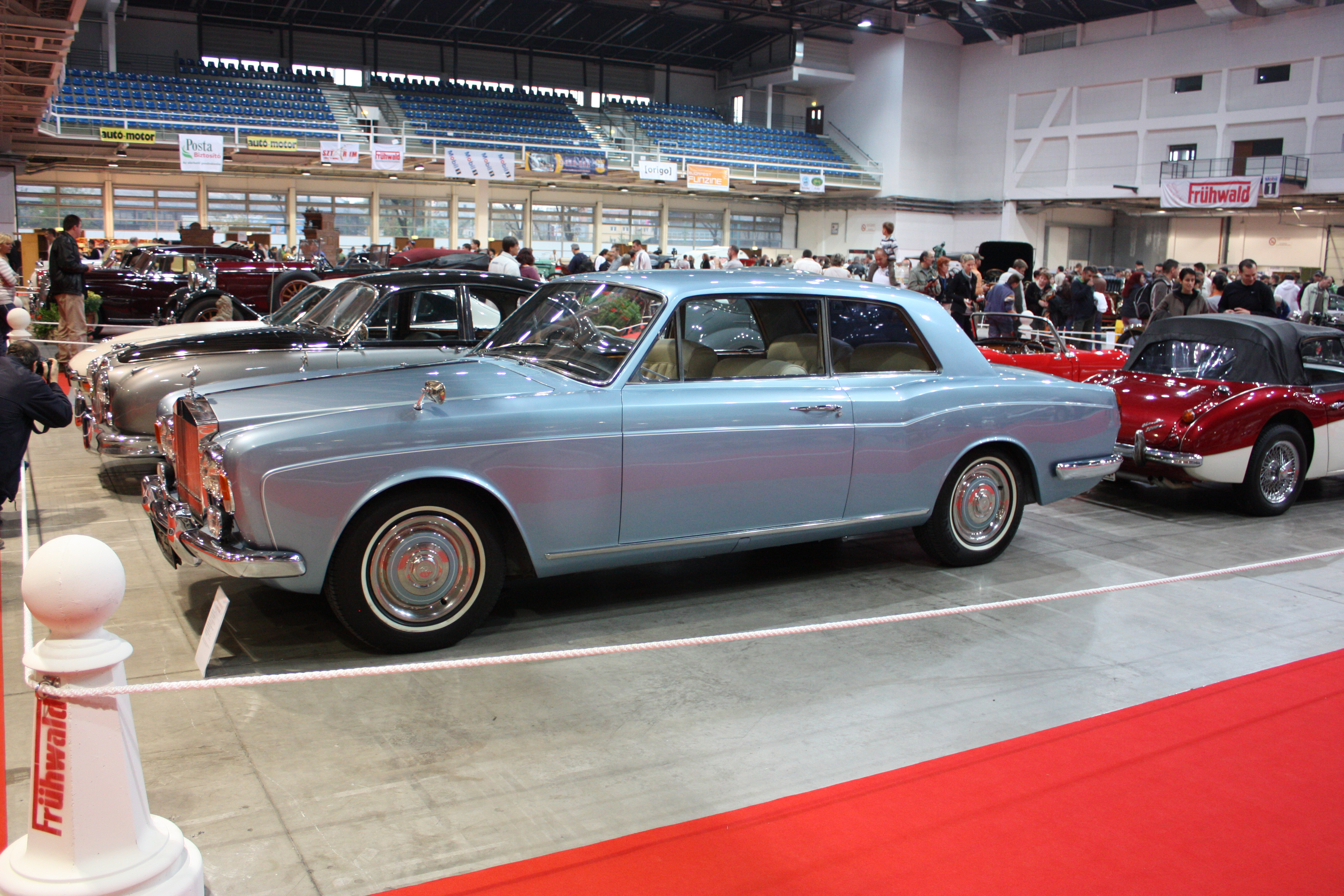
Mulliner Park Ward version

Some thirty-five Rolls-Royce Silver Shadow (and 15 Bentley T) fixed head coupés were created in 1966 and 1967 by removing rear doors from standard unitary construction production cars and extending the front doors. Lacking McNeil's touch the Rolls-Royce subsidiary Mulliner Park Ward with more technical information cornered the market .

James Young's last bodies were made on Rolls-Royce Phantom V chassis in 1968.

== Gallery ==
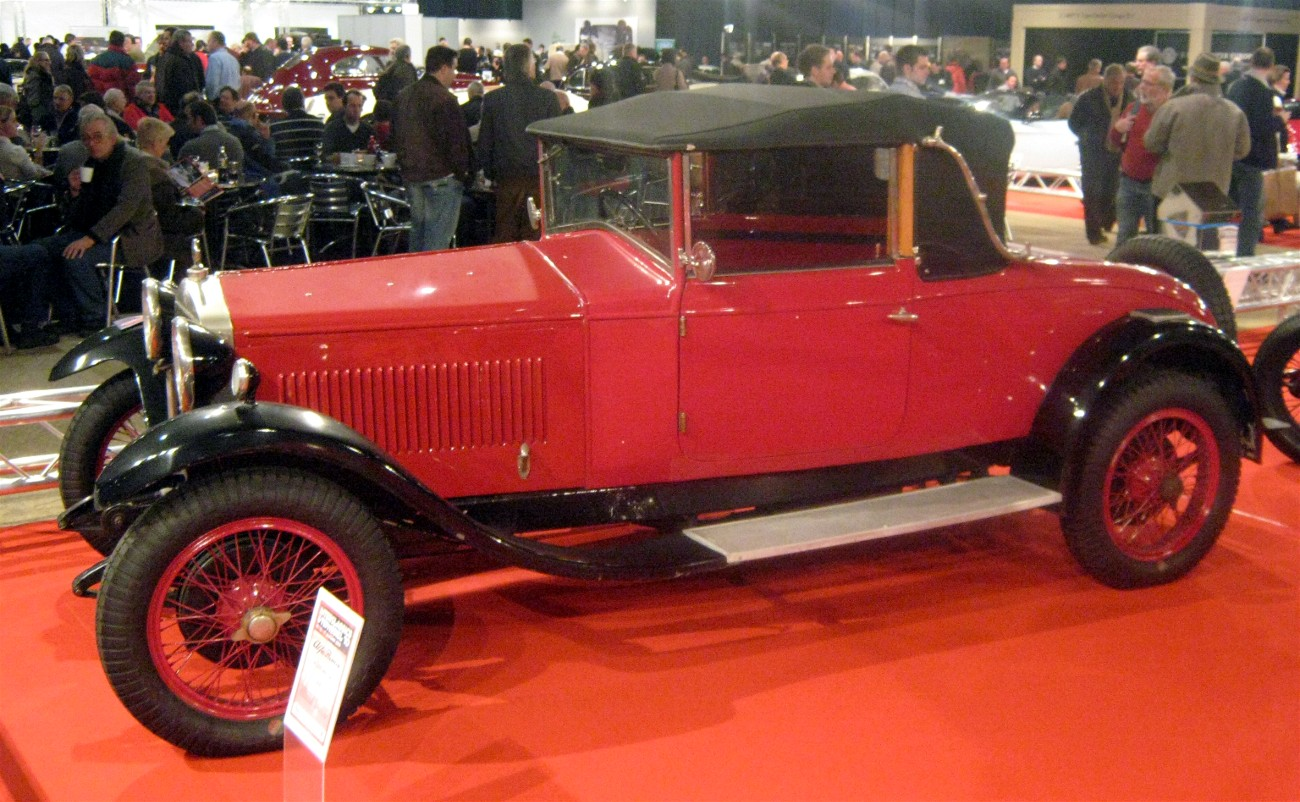
Drophead coupé
1928 Alfa Romeo
6C 1500 Normale

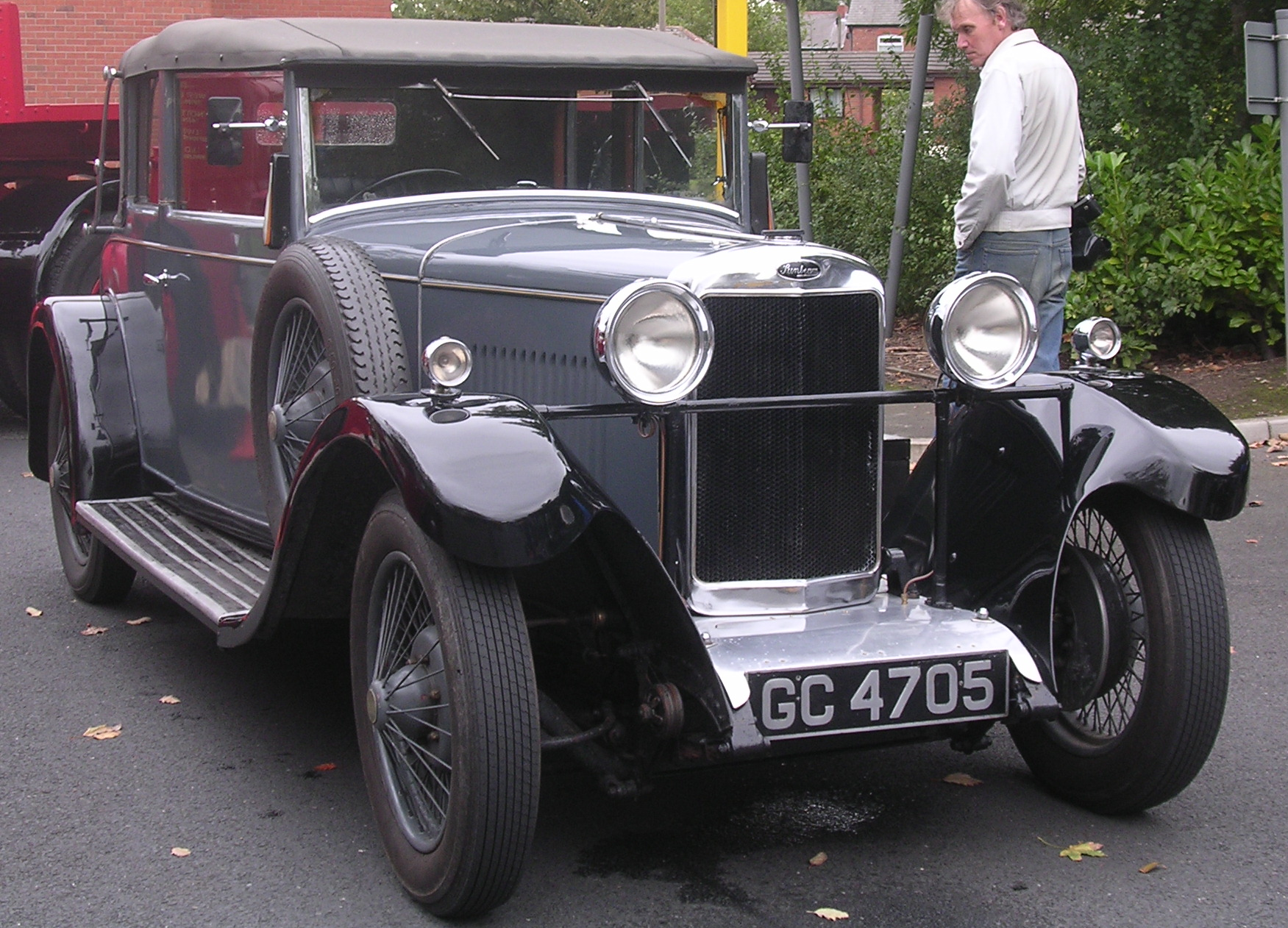
4-seater drophead coupé
1930
Sunbeam 16

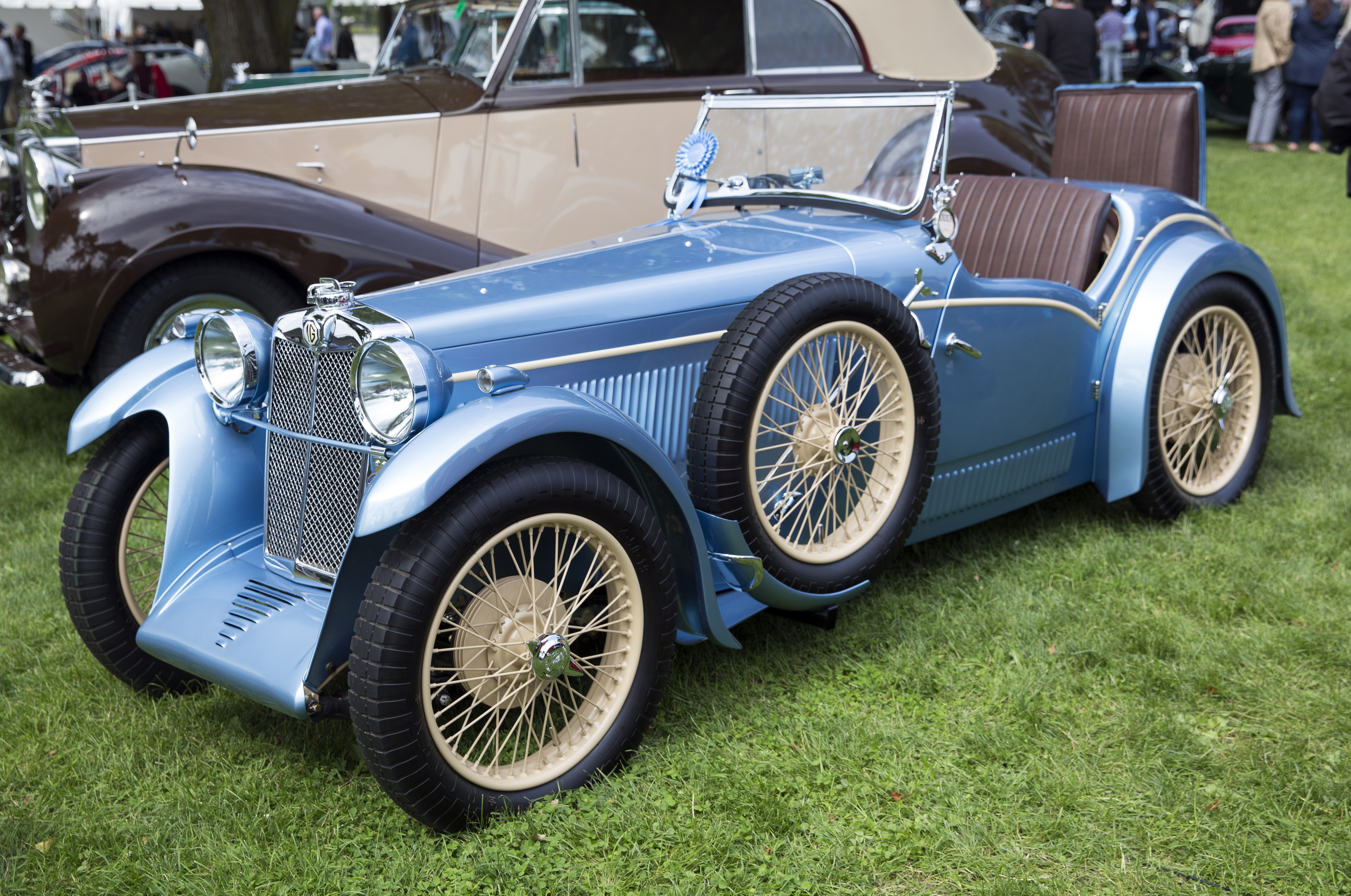
Sports car
1932
MG F1 Magna

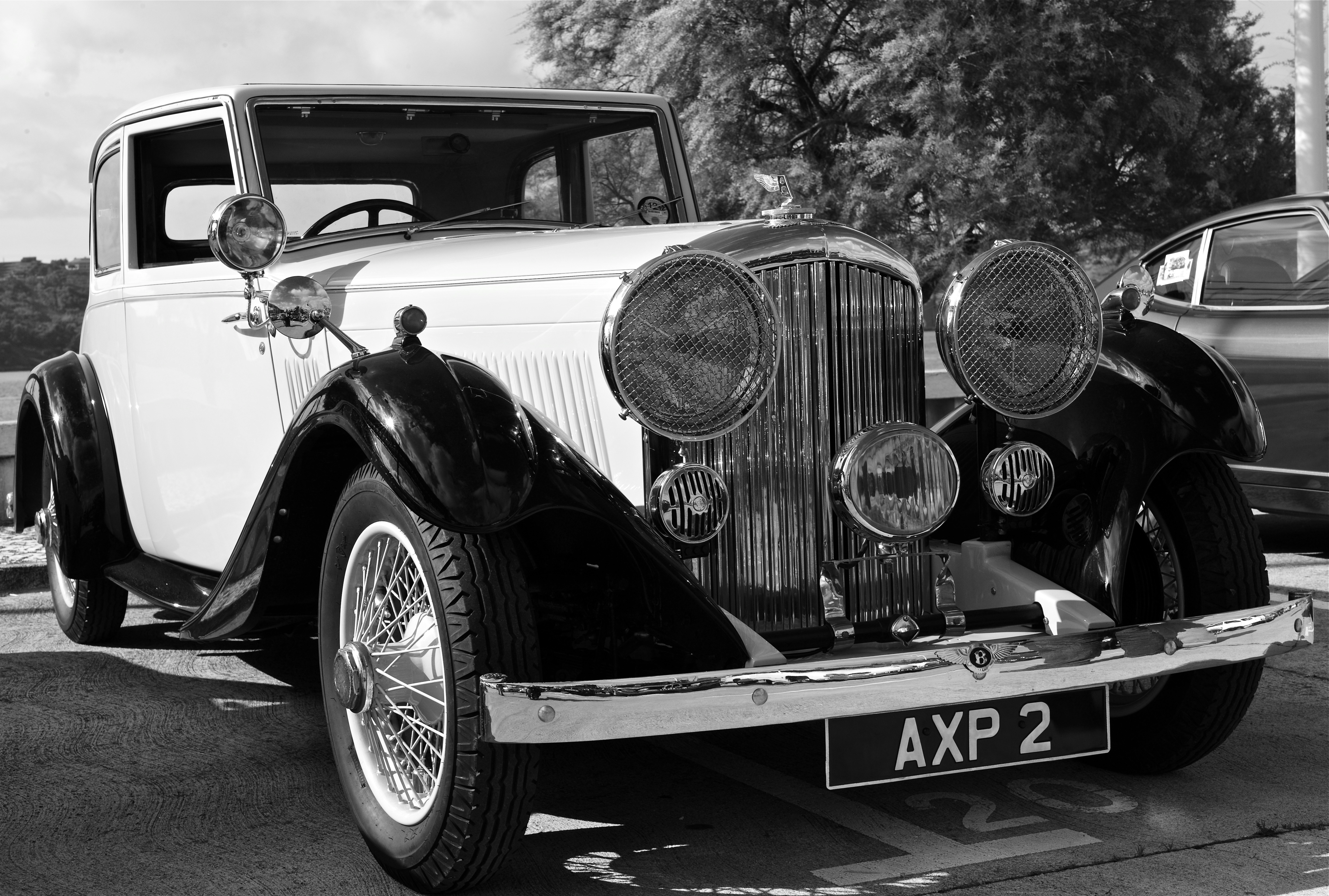
Fixed head coupé
1934
Bentley 3½ Litre

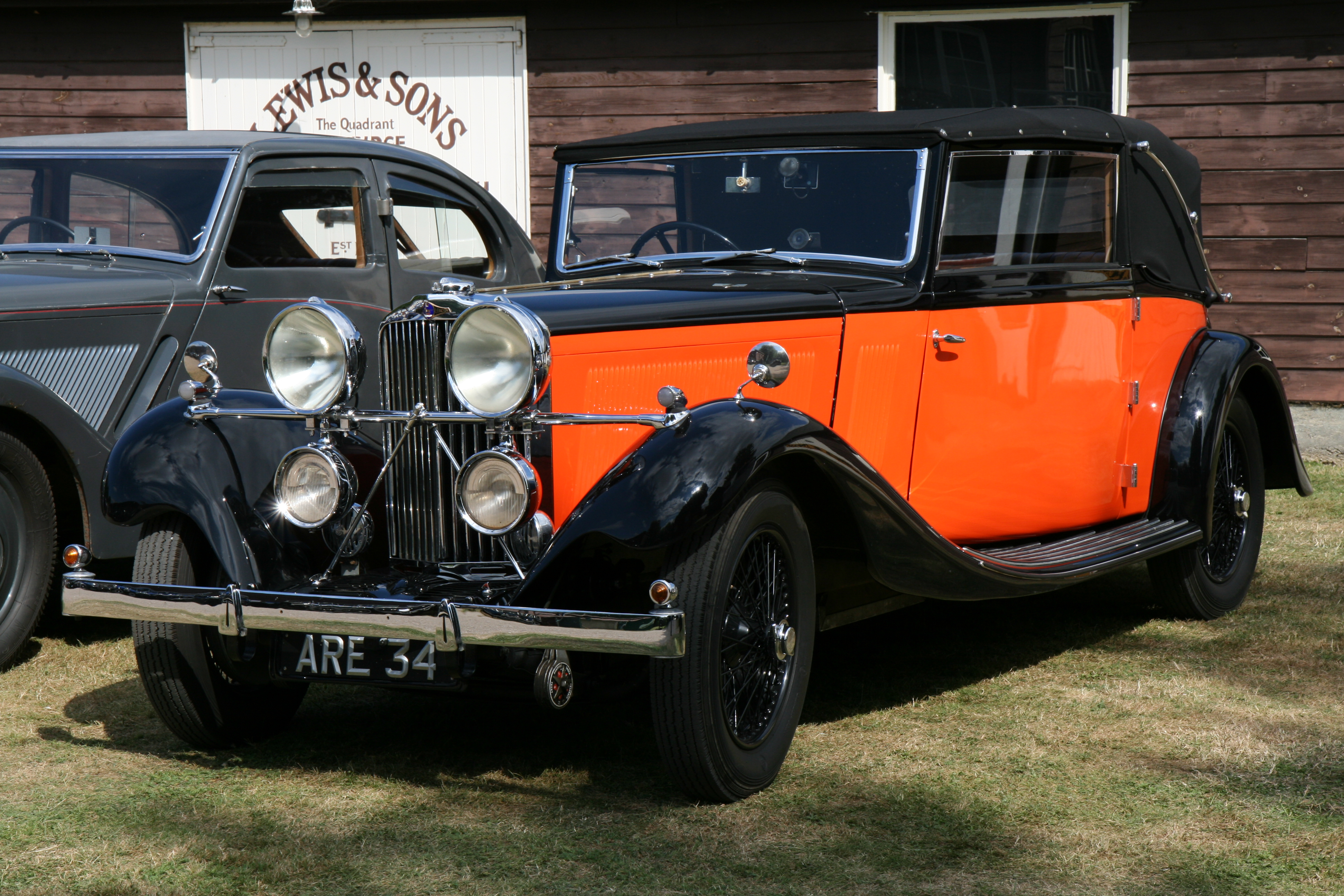
Drophead coupé
1934
Talbot BA105

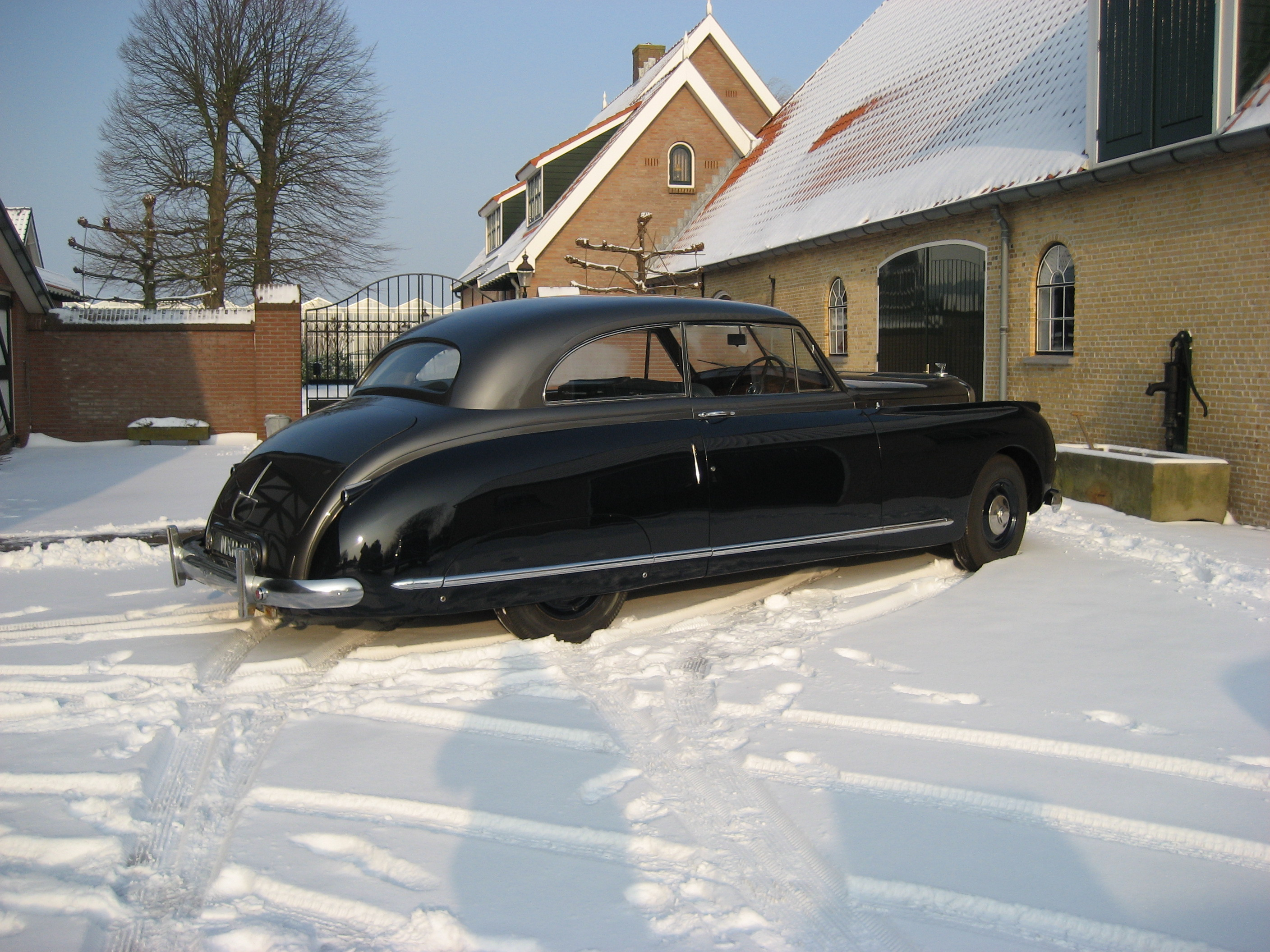
Coupé
1948
Bentley Mark VI

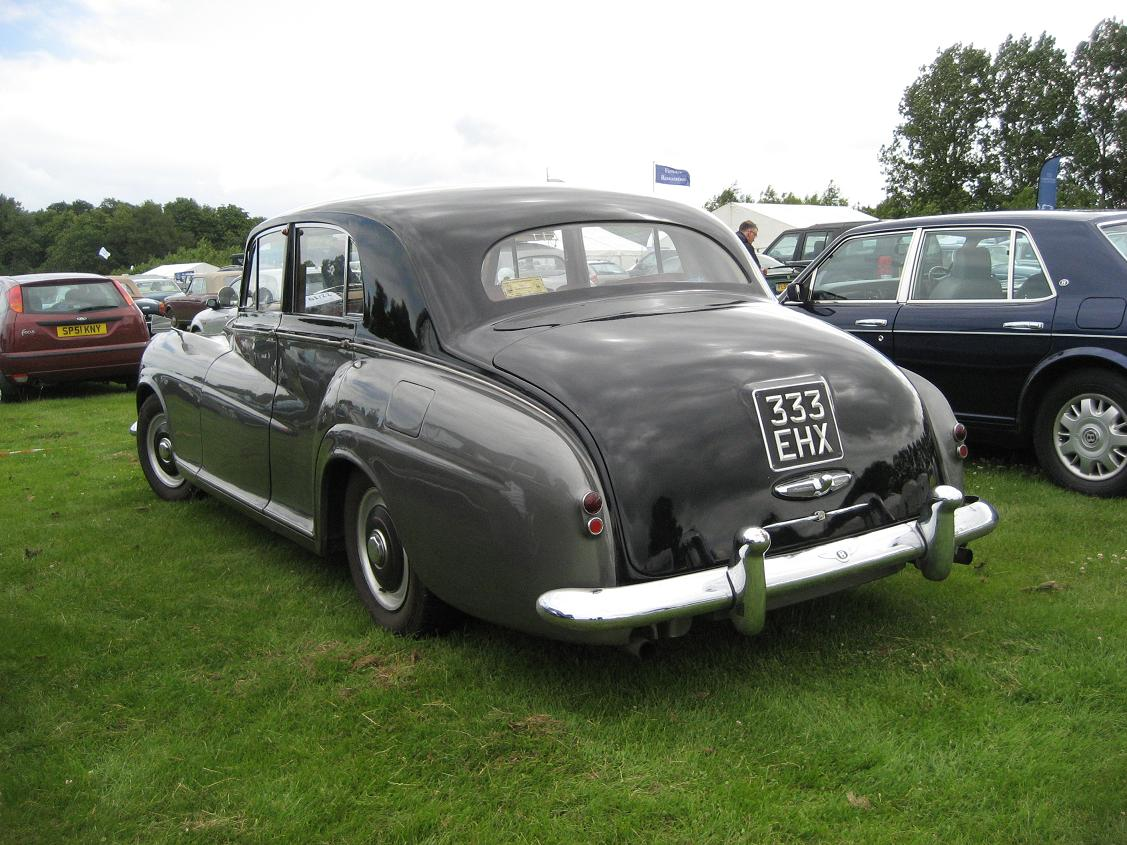
Saloon
1954
Bentley R-Type

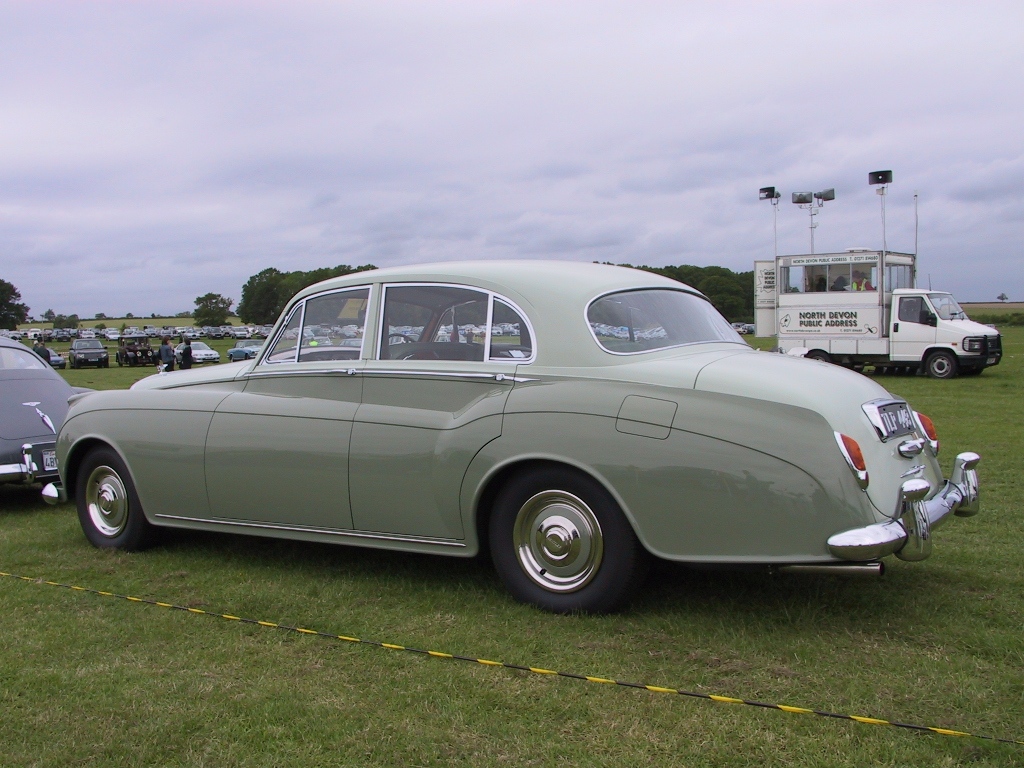
Saloon
1957
Bentley S

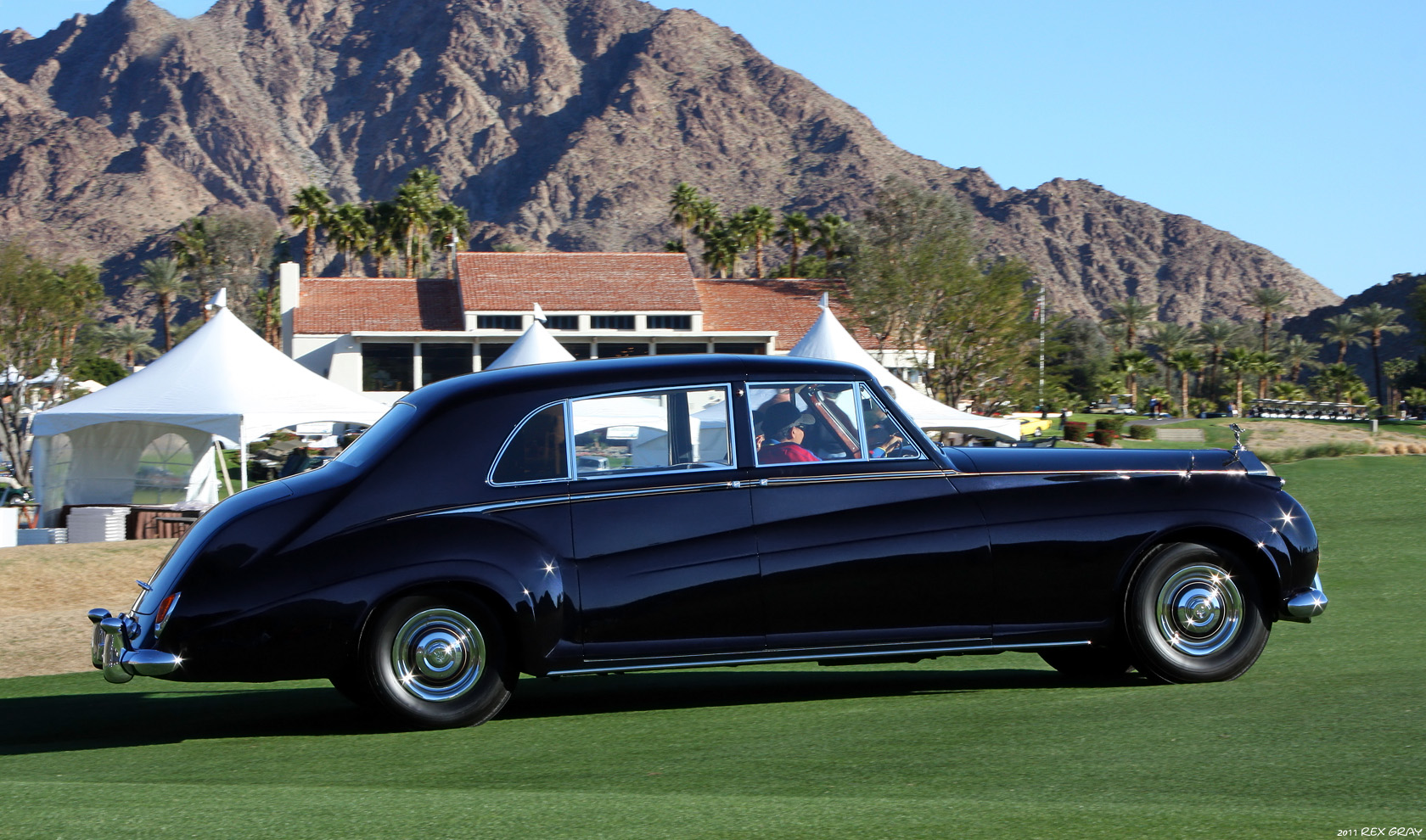
Limousine
1961
Rolls-Royce Phantom V

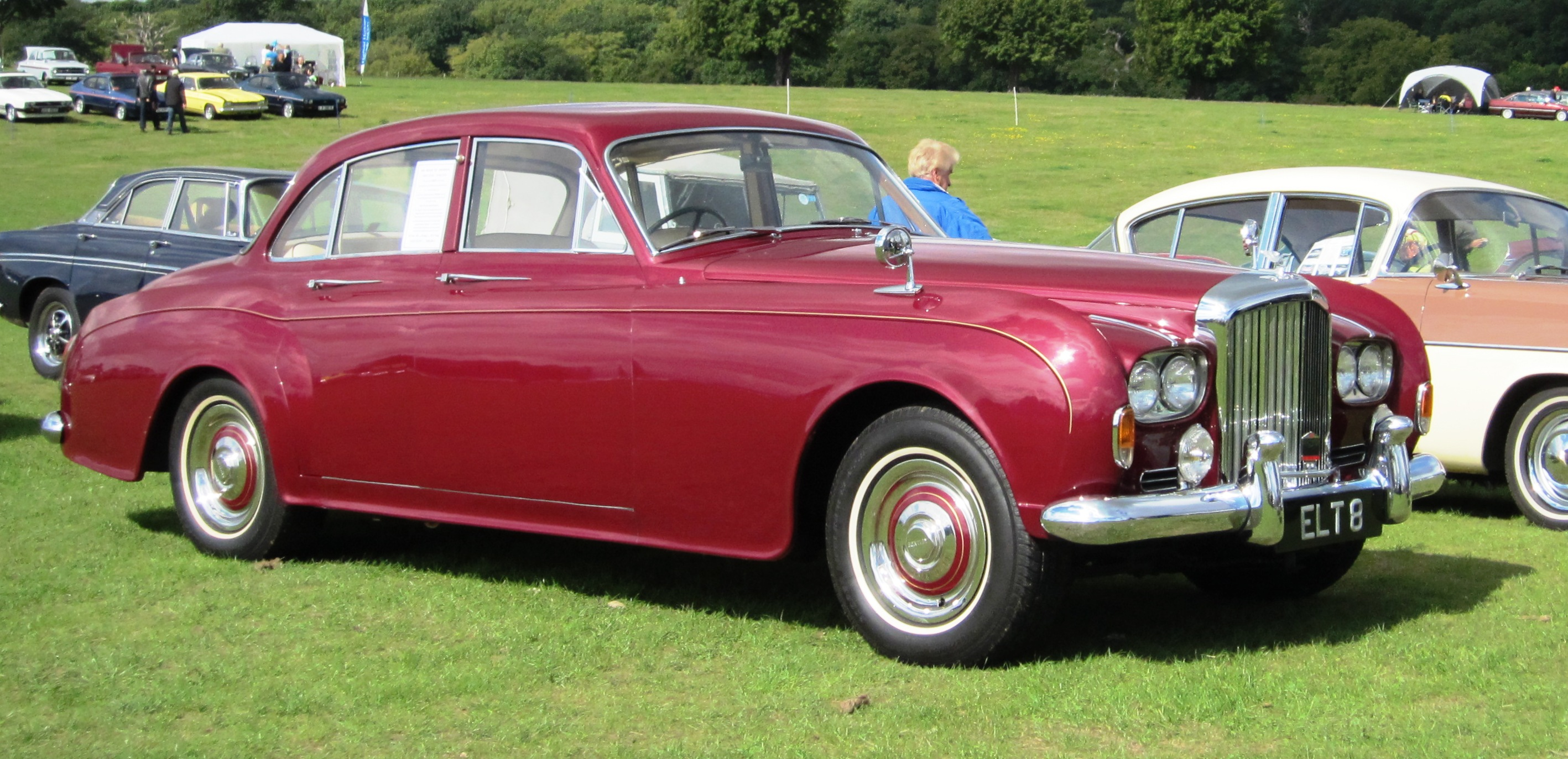
Owner driver saloon
1965
Bentley Continental S3
