= H.R. Owen =

British luxury motor retailer

Coordinates: 51.5021543°N 0.1559938°W

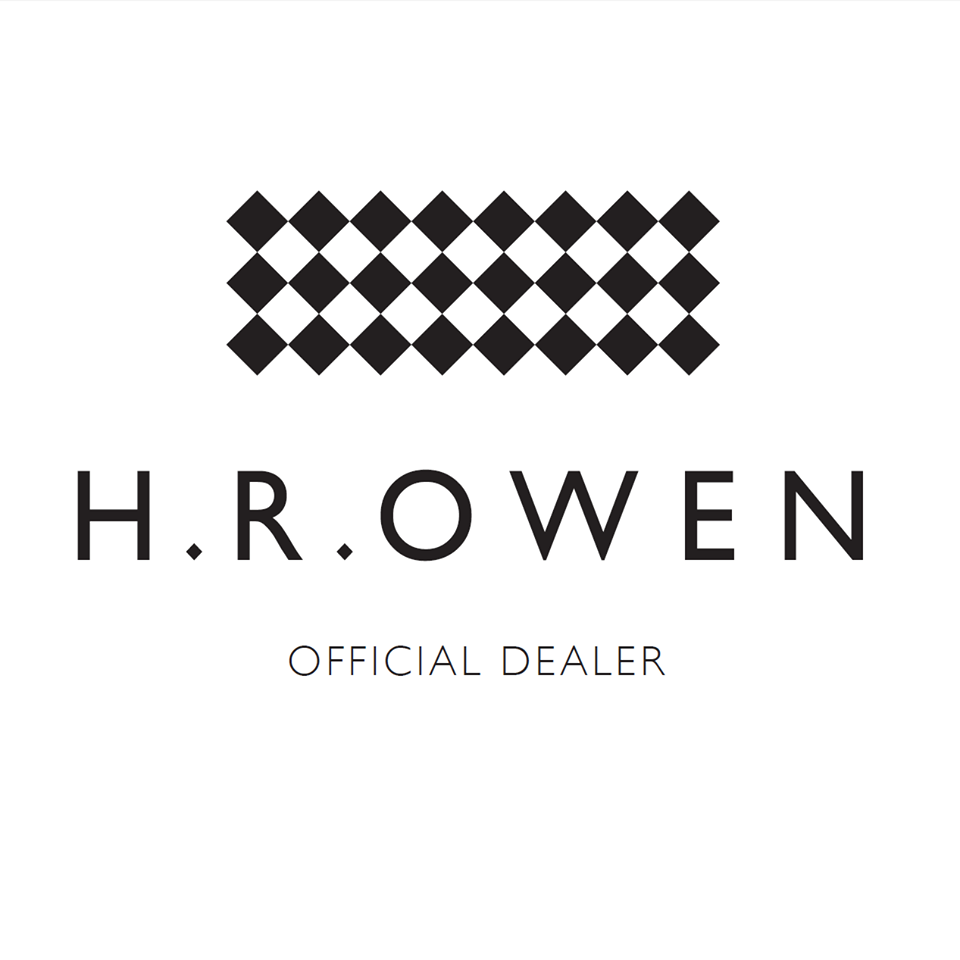
- Industry: Vehicle retailer
- Founded: 1932
- Headquarters: London, SW7; United Kingdom
- Key people: Harold Rolfe Owen (Founder); Ken Choo (CEO)
- Products: Luxury cars
- Revenue: £500 million
- Number of employees: ~500
- Website: www.hrowen.co.uk

H.R. Owen is a luxury motor retailer in Britain, and one of the world's largest retailers in Rolls-Royce, Bentley, Ferrari, Aston Martin, Maserati, Lamborghini and Bugatti brands. The company is headquartered in London, and operates 18 sales franchises and 17 aftersales franchises.

H.R. Owen runs the busiest Bugatti showroom in the United Kingdom, and the world's oldest Bentley showroom: Jack Barclay also located in Mayfair. Expanding its London operations it opened the United Kingdom's flagship Ferrari Showroom in Mayfair attracting customers from around the world and displaying a selection of the world's most sought after vehicles. In 2021 their £30 million plan to expand their Bentley, Lamborghini and Maserati showrooms on a 5 acres (2 ha) site in Hatfield, Hertofrdshire was announced.

Ferrari named H.R. Owen as the best Ferrari retailer in the world in 2014 after they had scored the maximum number of points in all of the judging categories. In 2018 their Rolls-Royce showroom in London was awarded Global Dealer of the Year by Rolls-Royce.

== Founding ==
Harold Rolfe Owen was born in Yorkshire on 6 November 1899, and served in the Royal Flying Corps in World War I. Serving in Northern France in 1917 the 18-year-old Captain Owen was badly injured in a crash, spending a week in a coma. It was almost a year before he could walk again, but after the war, he returned to uniform, joining the Indian Army.

Owen subsequently served for some years abroad, principally at Bombay, Karachi and Aden, before returning to Britain and beginning work at the National Benzole Company. A keen sportsman, Owen's skill as a polo-player made him welcome at society house parties. This gave him many useful sales contacts when he joined Rolls-Royce and Bentley retailer Jack Barclay in 1927, becoming general manager a short while later.

Harold Owen and Jack Barclay parted company amicably five years later when the former decided to start out on his own in motor retailing – though the two names would be linked once again 68 years later, when the two companies bearing their names were reunited. The new H.R. Owen Rolls-Royce and Bentley dealership opened in Mayfair's Berkeley Street in February 1932 and continued trading until the outbreak of war, when luxury car retailing came to an enforced halt.

Harold Owen fully intended to resume the motor retail business post-war, but he fell ill when on tank manoeuvres with his regiment, the 4th Queen's Own Hussars, and died on 17 February 1940, following an emergency operation to remove a brain tumour.

== Post war 1946–70 ==
Following Harold Owen's death, the H.R. Owen business was bought by Percy Fritz Swain, who reopened the business in 1946 on the old location in Berkeley Street. An astute trader, Swain began to build a larger motor empire, buying up retailers as well as coachbuilders and suppliers. On the death of A.J. Webb in 1955, Swain bought coach builder Freestone and Webb.

The post-war years were not kind to independent coachbuilders as prestige manufacturers such as Bentley and Rolls-Royce were obliged by advances such as monocoque construction (finally adopted in 1965 for their Silver Shadow and T-series cars) to shift from supplying only the chassis and drivetrain of a vehicle to building the complete car, bodywork and all. With Freestone and Webb's main chassis supplier relationship coming to an end, the coachbuilding business continued to refurbish and build bodies until 1958, when it became only a name for a showroom.

In October 1959 Swain sold the Rolls-Royce and Bentley distributorships and the allied service function to the Provincial Traction Company having previously sold H.R. Owen's other operations which he had put under the name of coachbuilders Harold Radford to a City syndicate led by Radford. The syndicate sold those operations to Provincial Traction in March 1961. Ten years later in 1969 Provincial Traction joined the Wiles Group which was later renamed Hanson Trust. Just over twelve months after that Hanson exchanged it with Lex which almost immediately passed it on to Heron Holdings.

== Growth and consolidation, 1970–2013 ==
H.R. Owen remained within Gerald Ronson's Heron Group for almost 25 years. It was bought by Malaya Group plc in 1994 then under the leadership of Nicholas Lancaster.

H R Owen plc

In 1997, on the 65th anniversary of H.R. Owen's foundation, Malaya Group changed its name to H.R. Owen plc. In 2000 the group bought Jack Barclay, thus becoming the world's largest dealer for Rolls-Royce and Bentley cars. Although the two brands were split at manufacturer level in 1998 between Rolls-Royce Motor Cars (bought by BMW Group), and Bentley (Volkswagen Group), H.R. Owen continues as a Rolls-Royce retailer, while Jack Barclay of Berkeley Square remains the world's largest Bentley dealer.

In 2004 the H.R. Owen group sold its Volkswagen and the majority of its BMW brand dealerships to their respective manufacturers. A year later the firm was appointed official UK dealer for Bugatti and by 2008 became the world's largest Bugatti dealer. The company was quoted on the London Stock Exchange under the securities code HRO.L.

In early 2011, as part of a new alliance with Ferrari, the company opened a flagship Ferrari 'Atelier' in London's Knightsbridge, where potential customers can customise their new car. In August of that year HR Owen announced the acquisition of Broughtons of Cheltenham, a smaller luxury motor dealer, for an enterprise value of £2.8 million. Broughtons owned three Bentley franchises in Cheltenham, Pangbourne and Byfleet (strengthening HR Owen's relationship with Bentley) and an Aston Martin franchise in Cheltenham, forging a relationship between HR Owen and Aston Martin for the first time.

In September 2013, H.R. Owen was the subject of a takeover by Malaysian investment group Berjaya Group, who paid £43.2 million for the company, becoming its majority shareholders.

Then in 2016, the Berjaya Group, led by its founder Vincent Tan, fully acquired H.R. Owen for an additional £149.8m.

== Brands and dealerships ==
The Group operates retail outlets in London, Berkshire, Gloucestershire, Hertfordshire, Surrey, and Manchester, which includes fourteen sales franchises and thirteen aftersales franchises for the Aston Martin, Bentley, Bugatti, Ferrari, Lamborghini, Maserati and Rolls-Royce marques.
