= Freestone and Webb =

English coachbuilder

Coordinates: 51.546°N 0.259°W

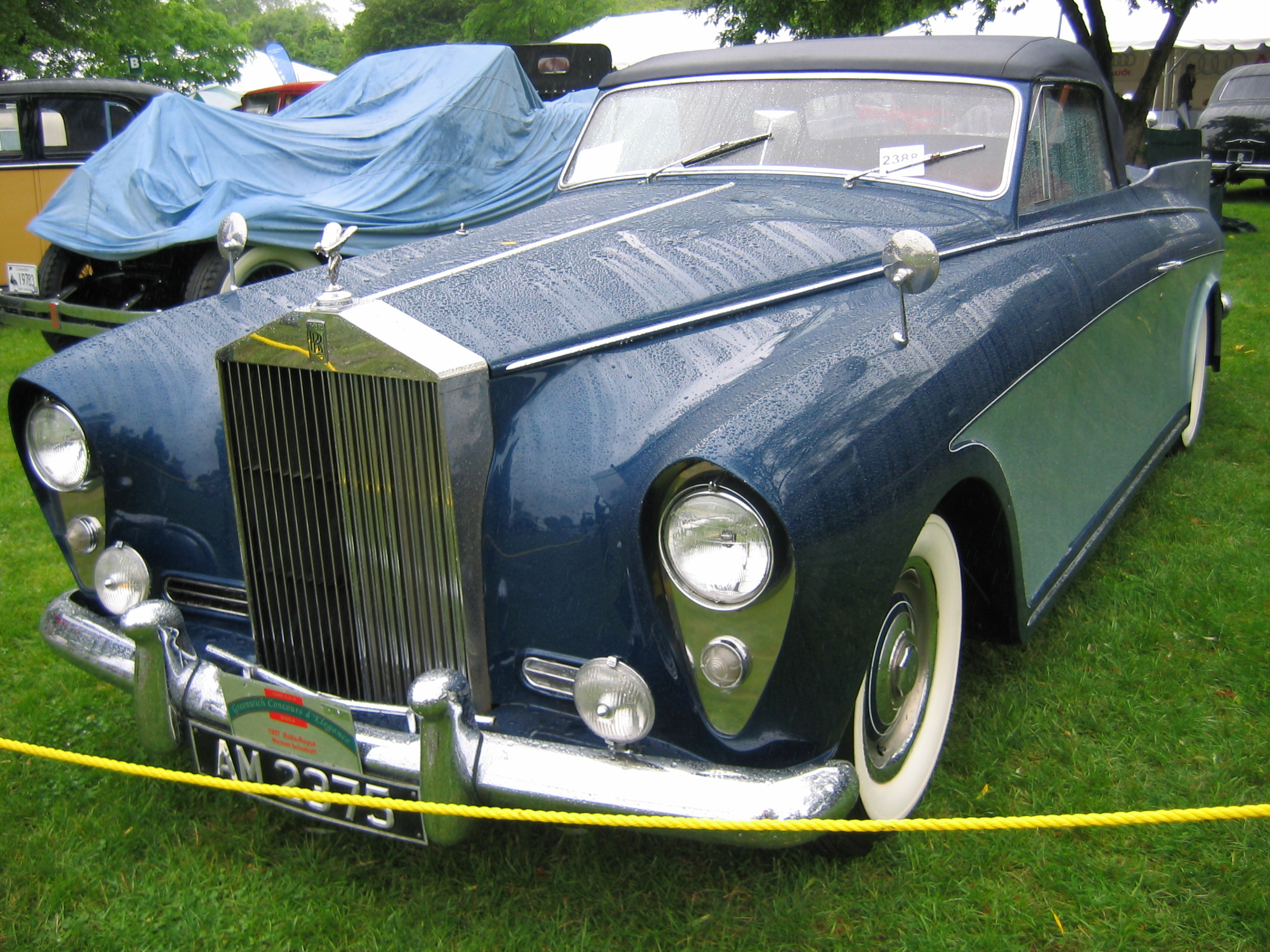
Rolls-Royce Silver Cloud drophead coupé, built for October 1957 Earls Court Motor Show

Freestone and Webb were English coachbuilders who made bodies for Rolls-Royce and Bentley motor cars but also built bodies on other chassis including Alfa Romeo, Packard, and Mercedes-Benz.

The business was founded in 1923 by V.E. Freestone and A.J. Webb as a specialist coachbuilding service in workshops (Unity Works) in Brentfield Road, Stonebridge Park, Willesden, North London, where it remained for its entire life. Freestone had learnt his trade working at Crossley Motors, Webb had returned to England having trained in France.

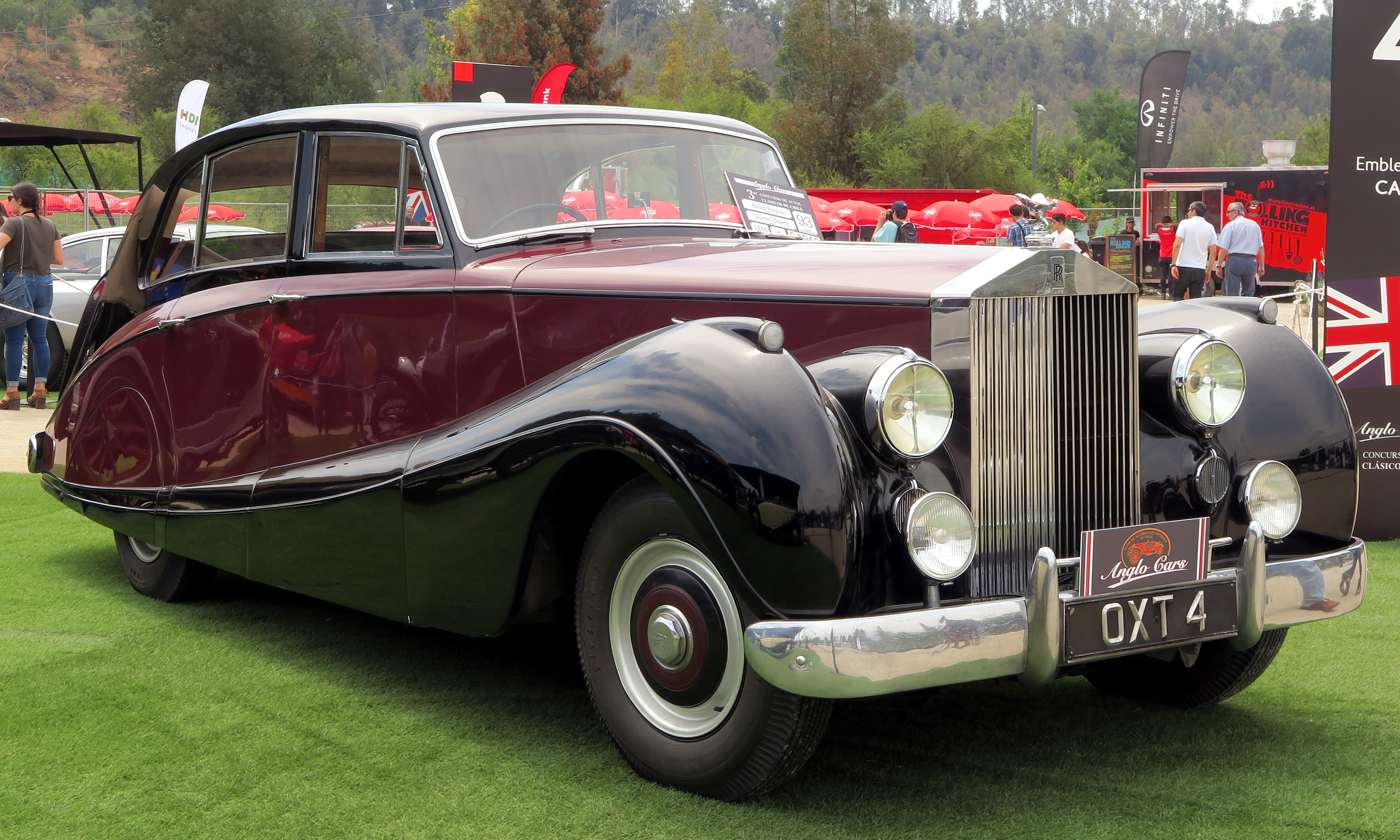
1954 Rolls-Royce Silver Dawn by Freestone & Webb

While working on bespoke Rolls-Royce and Bentley cars they developed the style known as Top hat, and popularised the Razor Edge style. Delivering up to 15 cars per annum they showed their cars at the London Motor Show and won the Gold Medal in the private coachbuilders competition nine years in a row.

Converted to aircraft components like many coachbuilders during the Second World War they made highly detailed and intricate wing tips for the Supermarine Spitfire.

After the Second World War Rolls-Royce offered a complete steel-bodied car, the Bentley Mark VI from 1946 and later the Rolls-Royce Silver Wraith. In the postwar austerity orders to Freestone and Webb tumbled and they began to suffer financial difficulties.

A.J. Webb died in 1955. In May 1957 Freestone & Webb Limited was taken over by the Swain Group, which owned motor dealer H.R. Owen of Berkeley Street, London. This was the same year as the introduction of the Bentley S1/Rolls-Royce Silver Cloud both of which continued to be available as a chassis-only option until 1965. Freestone & Webb continued to refurbish and build bodies until 1958 when it became a pure showroom brand. After Swain decided to divest itself of its coach building arm and focus just on motor retail Freestone & Webb was sold to the new owners of fellow coachbuilders Harold Radford in 1963.

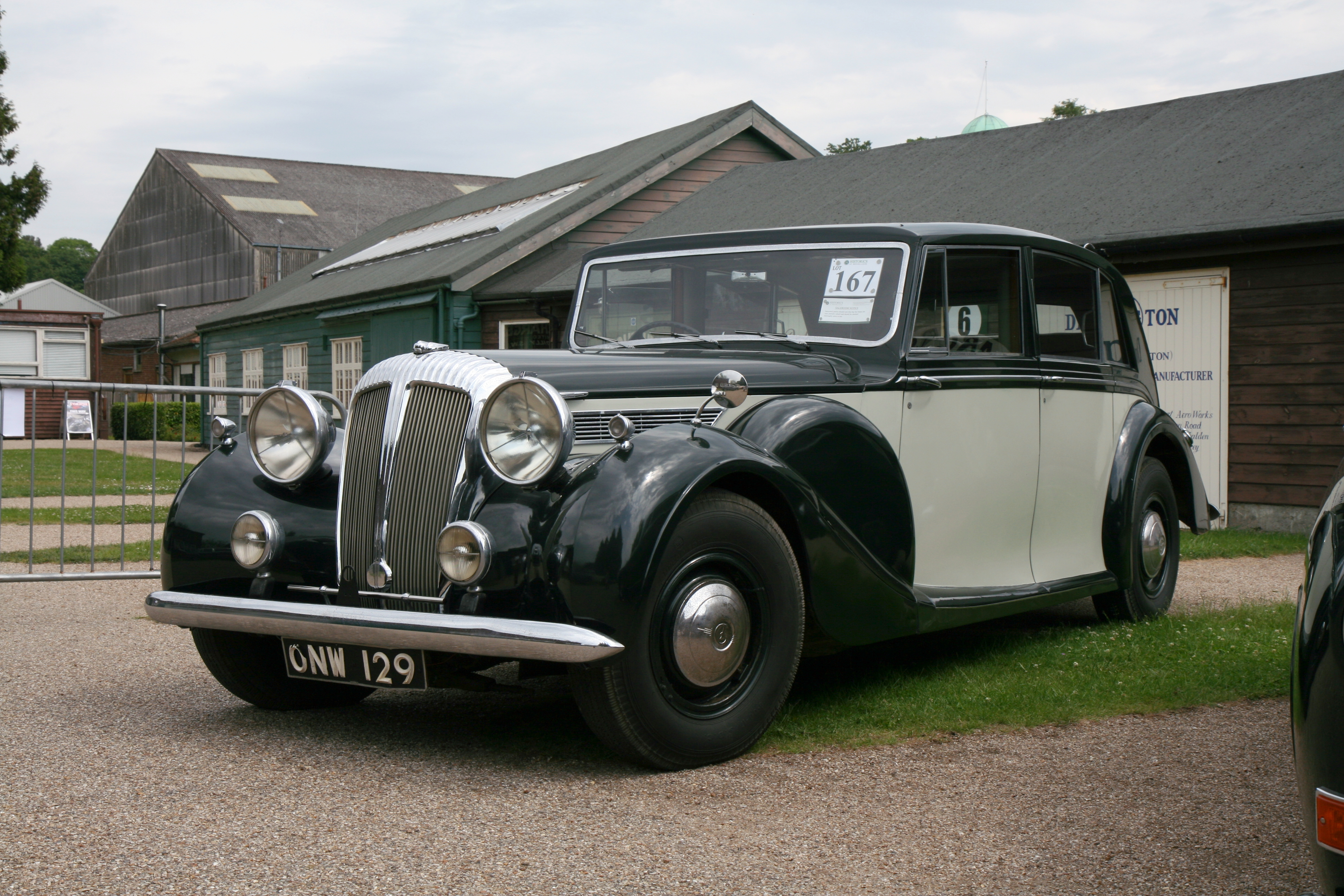
1950 Daimler DE36 Touring Limousine by Freestone & Webb

A new company called Freestone & Webb Limited was incorporated and registered at Companies House in 1990 by an enthusiast owner, who sold it together with his 1935 Bentley 3½ Litre saloon at an auction at Brooklands, on 2 June 2010.
