= Jack Barclay Bentley =

Motor dealership in England

Jack Barclay Bentley is the world's largest and oldest Bentley dealership and part of the H.R. Owen motor retailing group.

== John Donald "Jack" Barclay, 1900-1970 ==
Jack Barclay was a driver for Vauxhall. Originally most of his collection of Cups, now owned by his eldest son Anthony, were for successes in Vauxhall cars especially at Brooklands, very few for Bentley. For instance, the Pomeroy Trophy in a Vauxhall. Bentley was added as a dealership in 1926 (whilst Vauxhall was dropped). Their powerful grand tourers dominated endurance racing at Brooklands and Le Mans throughout mid and the late 1920s. Barclay recorded a number of victories at Brooklands, and logged eight world records in the International 3 Litre class in 1925. His racing prowess brought him to the attention of W.O. Bentley himself and later Woolf Barnato, the millionaire playboy who would go on to be both the chairman of Bentley and one of its works team's most successful racers.

Unlike the moneyed Bentley Boys, Jack had no inherited wealth himself but his wife Barbara had a good inheritance albeit she was not carefree or generous but on the contrary, careful. In 1922 he became a partner in motor retailer Barclay and Wyse, selling Vauxhall cars and [Rolls-Royce but limited numbers.|] . After he ran up massive gambling debts at the casino in Le Touquet his mother-in-law, fearful for her son-in-law and daughter's future, paid the debts on condition that he gave up racing and focused on his motor dealership business. Accordingly, in 1927 he opened Jack Barclay in George Street, Hanover Square as a Rolls-Royce and Bentley dealership, which soon became the pre-eminent Rolls Royce & Bentley dealership worldwide. But he couldn't resist another tilt at motorsport, winning the inaugural Brooklands 500 in 1929 at the wheel of a 4 ½ Litre with works driver Frank Clement, setting an average speed of 107.32 mph.

Bentley is credited for coining the phrase ‘service after sale’ to describe his business ethos and much of his commercial success was based upon maintaining close and friendly relationships with his customers, a philosophy still practiced today in the company. When he sold out to Dutton Forshaw in 1968 he arranged for his younger son Victor Barclay to take his place as CEO which he did until he died in the 1990s. Jack himself died of cancer at his Farm in Oxfordshire at the age of 69; very early in 1970.

== Company history ==
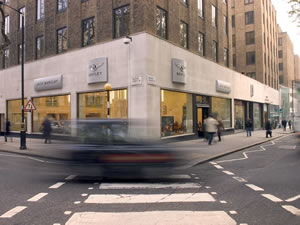
Jack Barclay Bentley, Berkeley Square

The company was founded by its eponymous chairman in 1927 as Jack Barclay Ltd with two London showrooms (the chief one being in George Street) and a service centre, later in Battersea. The company acquired the coach building firm James Young in 1937. Although motor retailing was suspended in the UK during World War II, Barclay bought coachbuilders Gurney Nutting in 1943 with the aim of restoring to roadworthy condition the Rolls-Royce and Bentley cars that had been stored during the hostilities, thus generating much-needed stock of used vehicles for the business.

In 1953 the company moved into showrooms in Mayfair's Berkeley Square, where it remains as of 2021. In 1958, Jack Barclay's son Victor joined the company at the age of 20. In 1961 Lord Kindersley, then Chairman of Rolls-Royce and Bentley Motor Cars officially opened the Jack Barclay service center at 100 York Road, Battersea.

Following Jack Barclay's retirement in 1967, the business was sold to the Dutton-Forshaw group. In 1977 the group was acquired by Lonrho, then headed by chief executive Tiny Rowland. In 1979 Victor Barclay became the managing director of Jack Barclay Ltd. He was Executive Chairman at the time of his death in 1993.

As the world's largest dealer in Rolls-Royce and Bentley cars the company forged strong links with the factory at Crewe. In 1993 the company was appointed the world's sole authorized distributor of parts for pre-1955 Rolls-Royce and Bentley Cars, and in the same year Peter Ward, then Chairman of Rolls-Royce and Bentley Motor Cars, officially opened 2-4 Ponton Road, Nine Elms, the largest Rolls-Royce and Bentley service and repair operation in the world. The company also commissioned a number of limited edition ‘Jack Barclay specials’ during the 1990s, including ten Jack Barclay Platinum Bentley Azures in 1997 to mark the company's 70th anniversary. In 1998 Rolls-Royce and Bentley parted ownership after which Jack Barclay Ltd became a solus Bentley dealership.

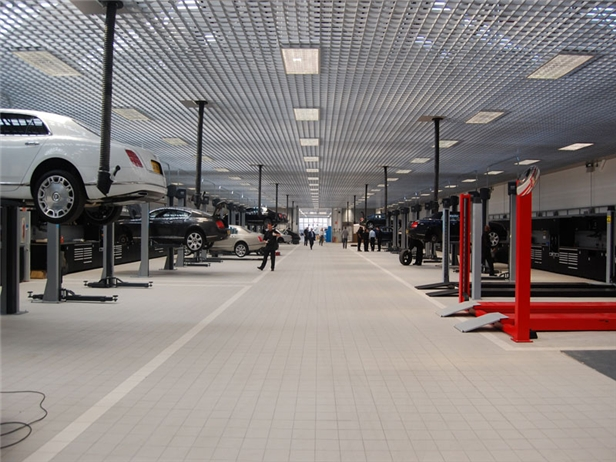
Jack Barclay Service Centre

In September 2000 Jack Barclay was acquired by the H.R. Owen group, the world's largest retailer in Rolls-Royce, Bentley, Lamborghini and Bugatti brands. In 2011 the Jack Barclay Service Centre was relocated to Burr Road in Wandsworth with a 16,000 square foot combined service and body shop facility.
