= Harold Radford =

British coachbuilders

Harold Radford & Co. Limited was a British retailer specialising in Rolls-Royce and Bentley cars. Situated in Melton Court, South Kensington, London SW7, opposite South Kensington tube station, the company, under G. Harold Radford, developed a bespoke coach-building business in the late 1940s named Harold Radford (Coachbuilders) Limited. The business initially focused on crafting bodies for new Bentleys tailored to the rural lifestyle of the landed gentry. During the Swinging Sixties, Radford gained recognition for its luxury versions of the cult-car Mini.

In 2021, the Radford name was relaunched as a supplier of bespoke global luxury cars by Formula One driver Jenson Button and TV presenter and car builder Ant Anstead, the new company has no links to Harold Radford & co. Limited

== Ownership ==
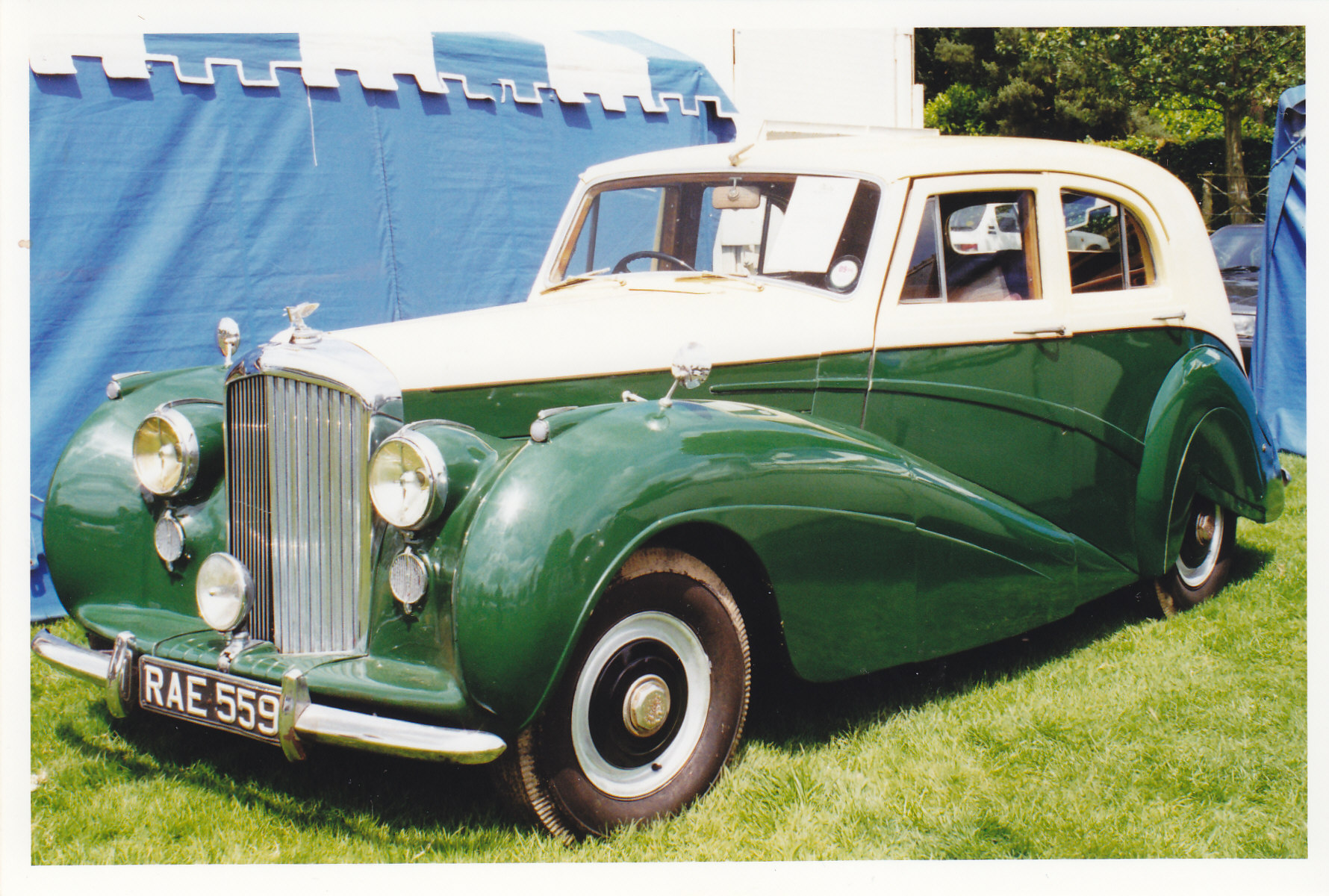
1953 Bentley R Type Countryman by Harold Radford

Harold Radford (Coachbuilders) Limited, part of the H. R. Owen group (H. R. Owen, a member of the Swain group owned by the Provincial Traction Company Limited since October 1959), combined with the servicing and body repair operations of H. R. Owen and Swain under the name Harold Radford (Coachbuilders) Limited in March 1961.

In September 1966, Harold Radford (Coachbuilders) Limited voluntarily entered liquidation due to its inability to meet its liabilities. In October 1967, a new company, Harold Radford Coachbuilders (1967) Limited, was established to continue acquiring cars.
