= Rolls-Royce Silver Dawn =

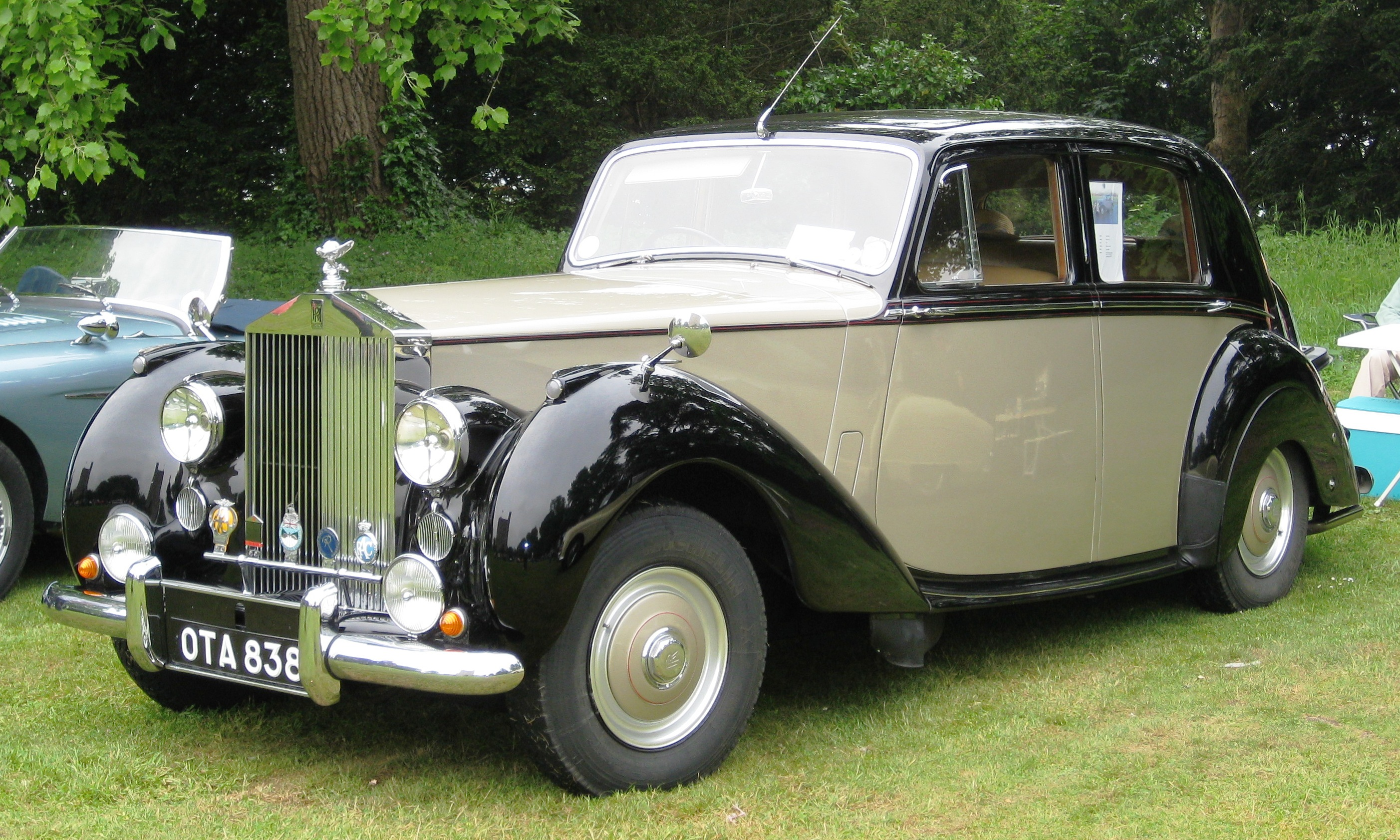

Overview
- Manufacturer: Rolls-Royce Ltd
- Production: 1949–1955; 785 made
- Assembly: United Kingdom: Crewe, Cheshire, England

Body and chassis
- Class: Full-size luxury car (F)
- Body style: 4-door saloon
- Layout: Front-engine, rear-wheel-drive
- Related: Rolls-Royce Silver Wraith; Bentley Mark VI; Bentley R Type

Powertrain
- Engine: 4.2 L (260 cu in) I6; 4.6 L (280 cu in) I6
- Transmission: 4-speed manual or 4-speed automatic

Dimensions
- Wheelbase: 120 in (3,048 mm)
- Length: 4877 to 5334 mm (192 to 210 inches)
- Width: 69 in (1,753 mm)
- Height: 64.5 in (1,638 mm)

Chronology
- Predecessor: Rolls-Royce Wraith
- Successor: Rolls-Royce Silver Cloud

The Rolls-Royce Silver Dawn is a full-size luxury car that was produced by Rolls-Royce at their Crewe works between 1949 and 1955. It was the first Rolls-Royce car to be offered with a factory built body which it shared, along with its chassis, with the Bentley Mark VI until 1952 and then the Bentley R Type until production finished in 1955. The car was first introduced as an export only model. The left hand drive manual transmission models had a column gear change, while right hand drives had a floor change by the door. In the British home market the Silver Dawn only became available from October 1953, with the introduction of the model corresponding to the Bentley R Type.

== History ==
In 1944 W. A. Robotham saw that there would be limited postwar demand for Rolls-Royce or Bentley chassis to be fitted with bodies from specialist coachbuilders, and negotiated a contract with the Pressed Steel Company for a general-purpose body to carry four people in comfort on their postwar rolling chassis, fitted as always with a distinct Rolls-Royce or Bentley radiator. Though he stretched the demand to 2000 per year, Pressed Steel were "nonplussed" by the small demand.

A mere 760 were produced between 1949 and 1955. Silver Dawn Series A-D had bodywork identical to the Mark VI. In 1953, with the "E" series (Chassis Number SKE2), the Silver Dawn body was modified in parallel to the Bentley Mk VI body and a large boot was added. While the Bentley Mk VI was renamed the Bentley R after this change, the Rolls-Royce Silver Dawn kept its name. Even with mass produced Standard Steel bodies, all panels forward of the bulkhead/firewall were slightly different for the Rolls-Royce from those fitted to the Bentley.

== Technical description ==
In 1951 the Silver Dawn was upgraded to the 4 1/2 L engine and the full flow oil filter (Chassis Number LSFC2). In 1953 the high compression cylinder head was fitted from Chassis number SMF66 and from the same chassis number on the Bentley Mk VI type camshaft was fitted to left hand drive vehicles. Earlier models up to circa May 1954 had a different fascia from the Bentley Mk.VI and 'R' Type, and were fitted with a single exhaust system. Later models from the SRH2 chassis series had the Bentley style fascia and the twin exhaust system, as fitted to the Bentley 'R' Type.

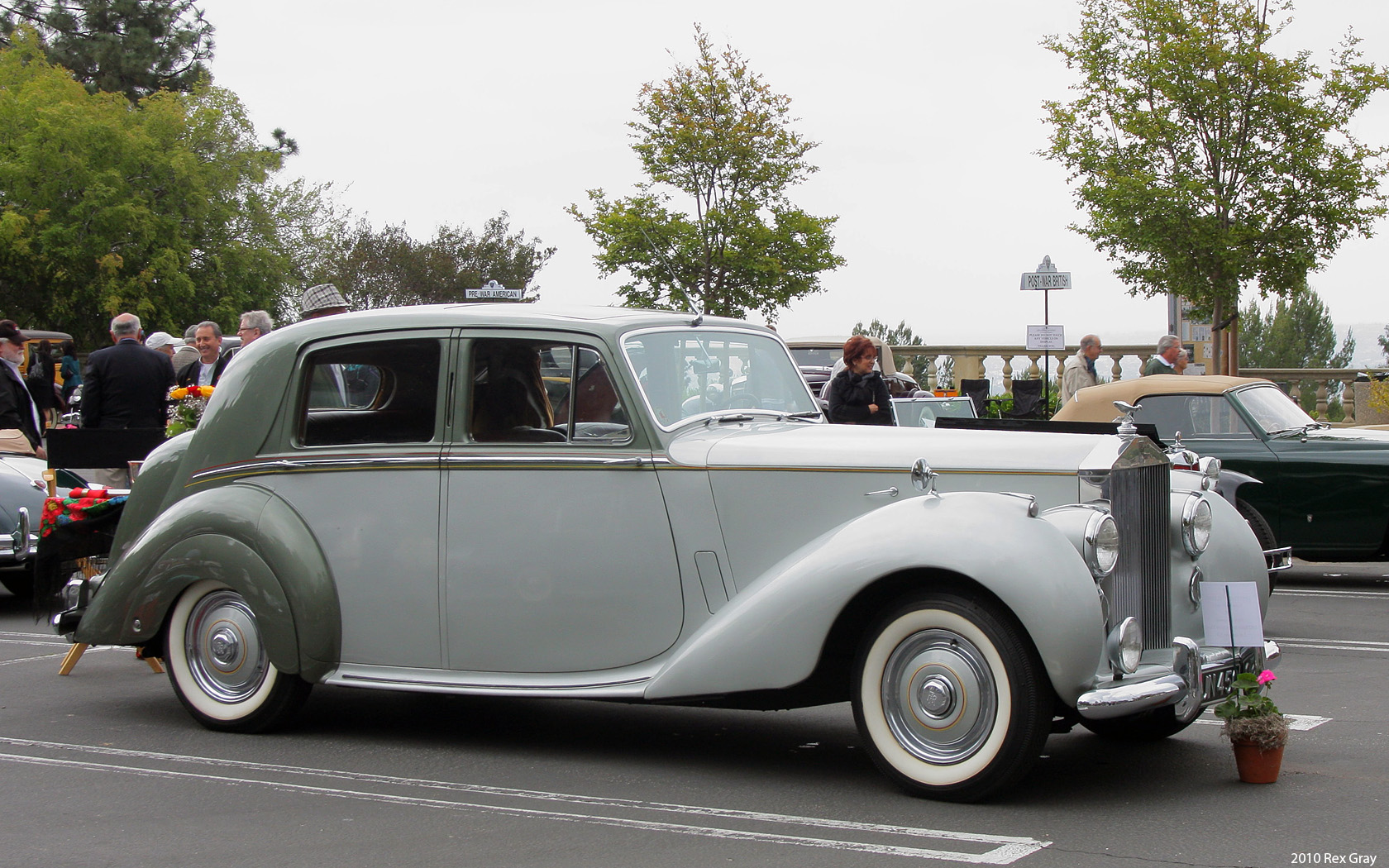
1952 model Rolls-Royce Silver Dawn ("small boot")

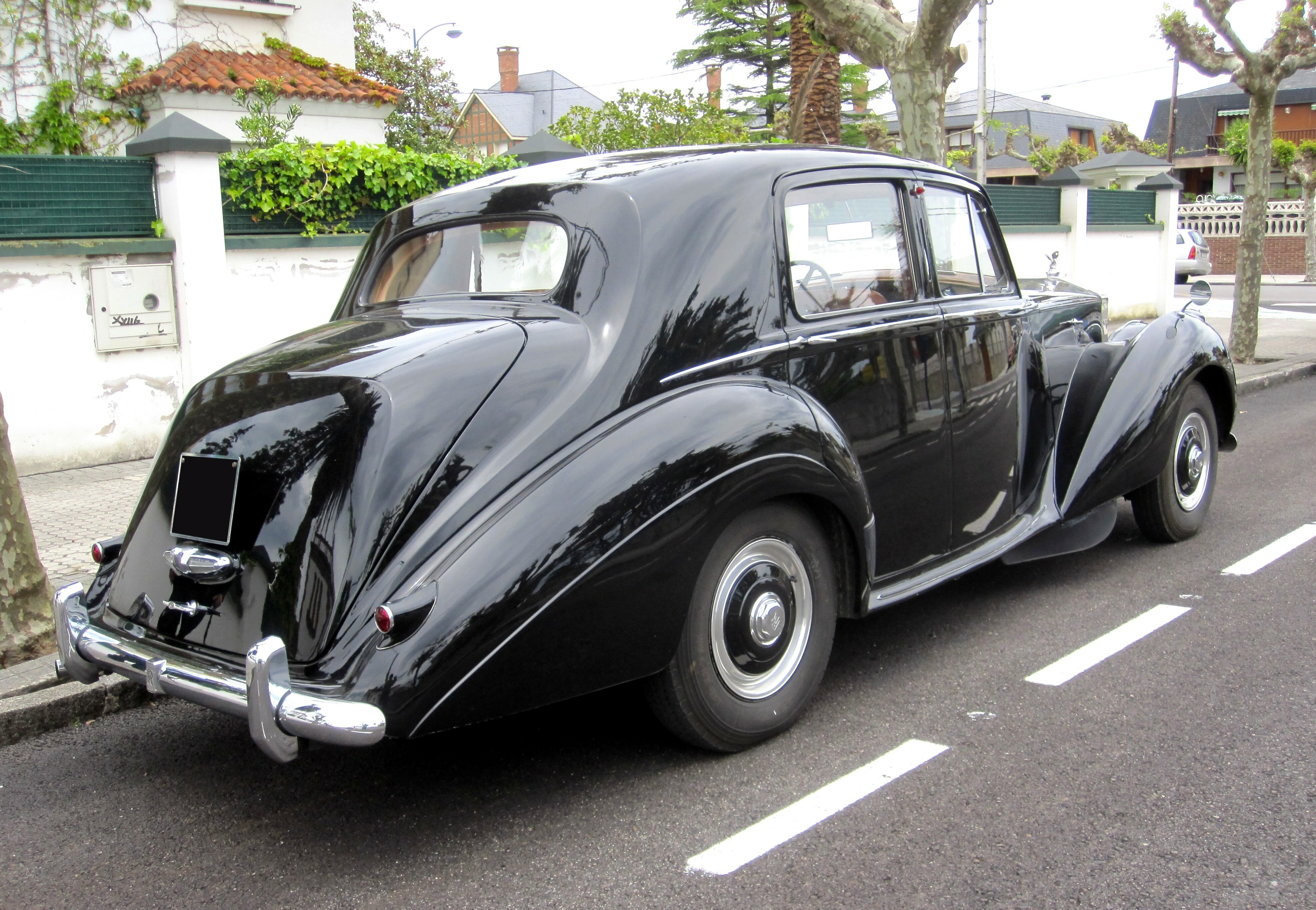
Late model Rolls-Royce Silver Dawn ("big boot")

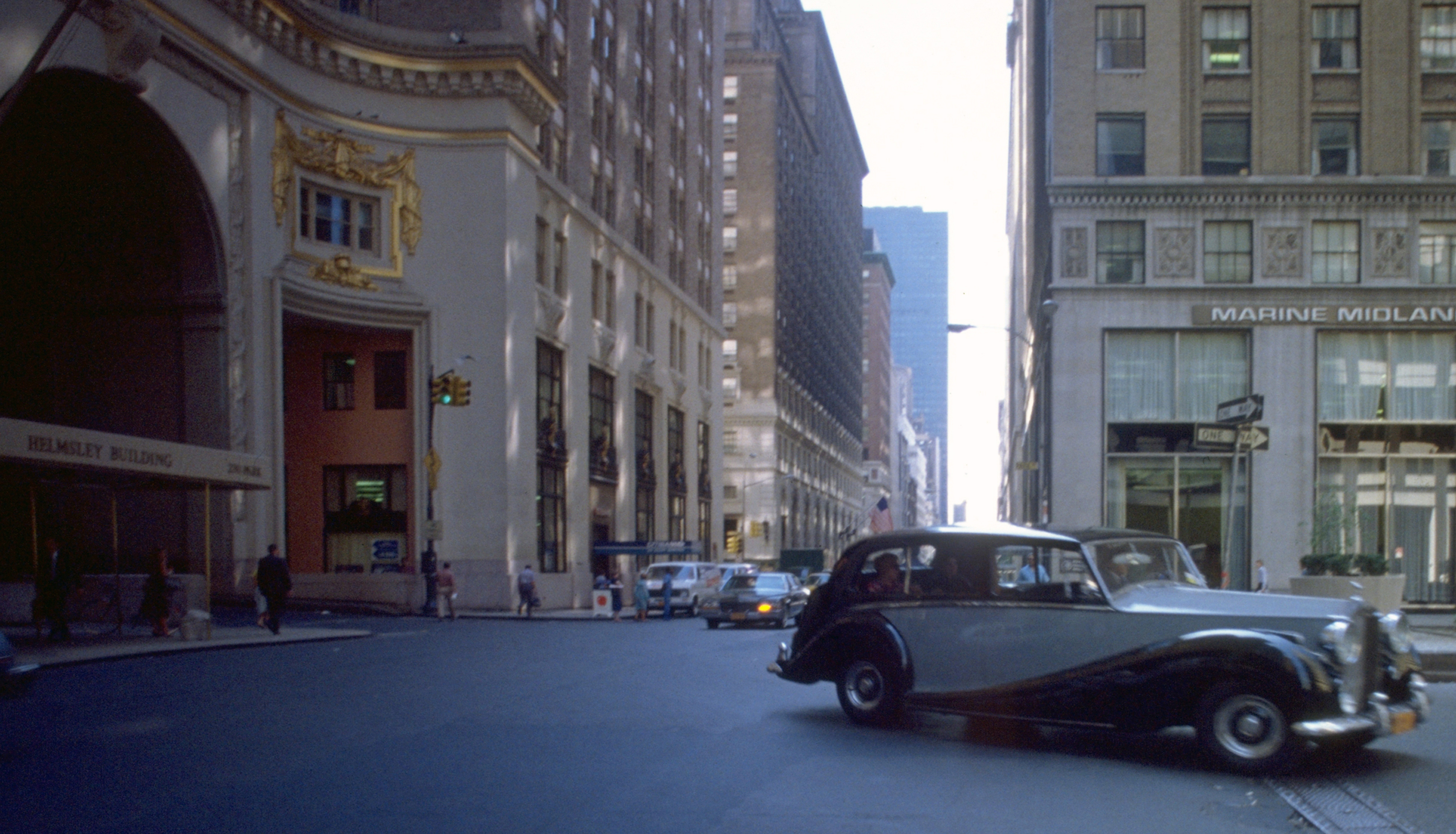
Rolls-Royce Silver Wraith, Park Avenue, New York City. Rolls-Royce’s other offering at the time was produced as a chassis only and bodied by independent coachbuilders.

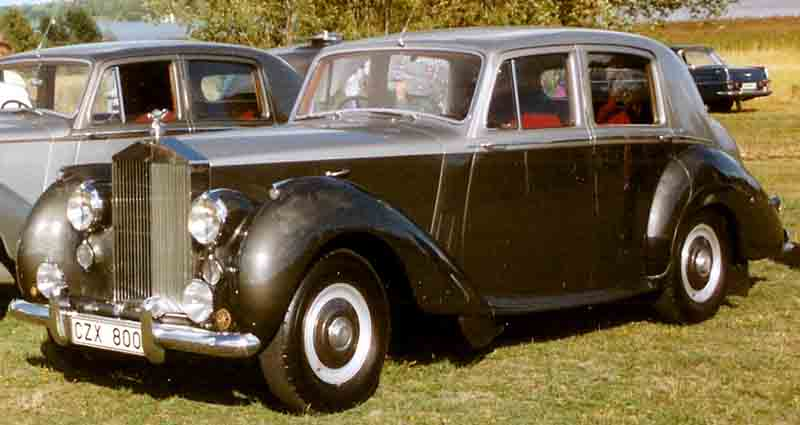
1954 Rolls-Royce Silver Dawn 4-door saloon

The inline six-cylinder engine had overhead inlet and side exhaust valves and had a capacity of 4,257 cc (259.8 cu in) until 1951 when it was enlarged to 4,566 cc (278.6 cu in). The carburettor up to Chassis number SFC100 was a single double downdraught Stromberg type AAV 26 until 1952 when it was replaced by a Zenith DBVC42.

A 4-speed manual gearbox was fitted to all cars at first, with a 4-speed automatic becoming an option in late 1952 on the 'E' Series chassis, and on the corresponding Bentley R Type chassis. There are conflicting reports if the automatic gearbox became standard in the Silver Dawn, but both manual and automatic options were available until the end of the production run. However the original invoice for a 1955 UK model (Chassis Number SVJ115) clearly shows that the Automatic Gearbox was an optional extra and cost the buyer £70.0.0.

The suspension was independent at the front using coil springs while at the rear the live axle used half elliptic leaf springs. The car had a separate chassis made with traditional riveted construction until 1953 after which it was welded. Servo assisted 12.25 in (311 mm) drum brakes were used, hydraulically operated at the front but retaining mechanical operation at the rear. Although many cars were fitted with factory built bodies, others were supplied to external coachbuilders.

== Performance ==
A factory bodied Silver Dawn with automatic transmission tested by The Motor magazine in 1954 had a top speed of 94.0 mph (151.3 km/h) and could accelerate from 0-60 mph (97 km/h) in 15.2 seconds. A fuel consumption of 15.4 miles per imperial gallon (18.3 L/100 km; 12.8 mpg_{‑US}) was recorded. The test car cost £4704 including taxes.

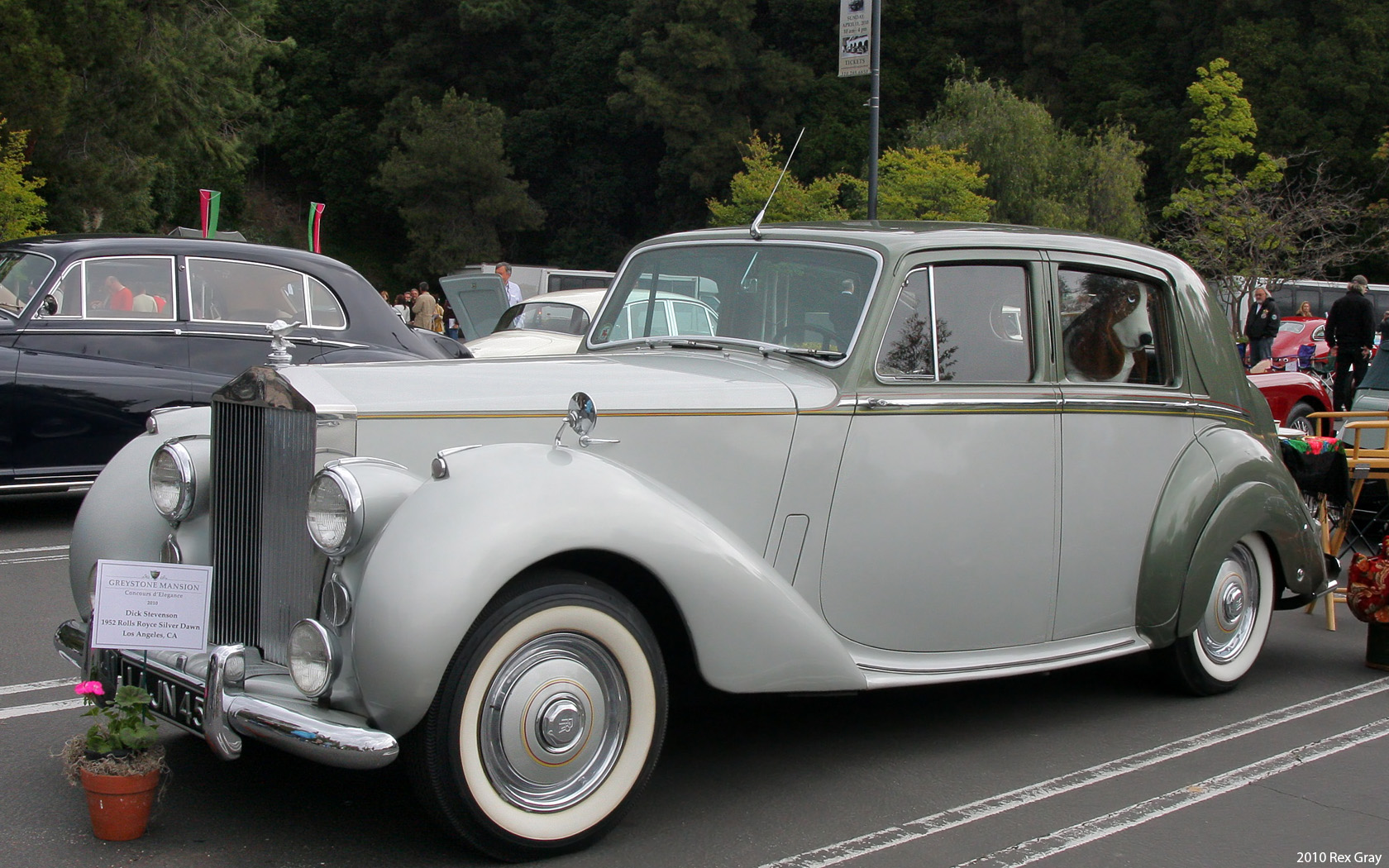
1952 car exported to the North American market
