= John Polwhele Blatchley =

English car designer

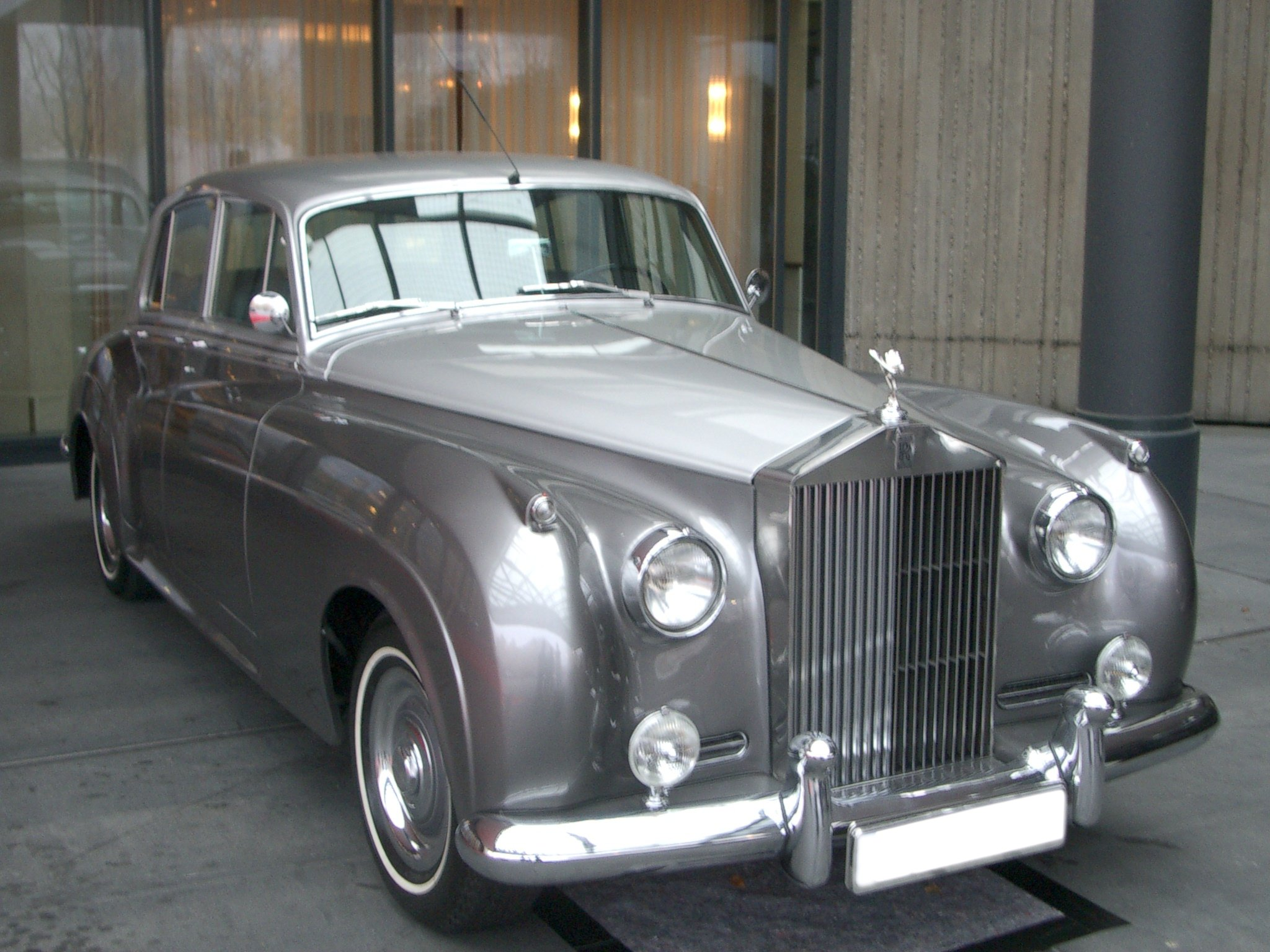
- Blatchley's best known design, the Rolls-Royce Silver Cloud
- Born: John Polwhele Blatchley; 1 July 1913; Hendon, London, England
- Died: 16 February 2008 (aged 94); Hastings, Sussex, England
- Occupation: Car designer (Rolls-Royce)
- Spouse: Willow D. J. Sands

John Polwhele Blatchley (1 July 1913 – 16 February 2008) was a London-born English car designer known for his work with J Gurney Nutting & Co Limited and Rolls-Royce Limited. He began his career as designer with Gurney Nutting in 1935, moving up to Chief Designer before leaving in 1940 to join Rolls-Royce. There he served as a draughtsman (1940–43), stylist in the car division (1943–55), and chief styling engineer (1955–69).

== Early life ==
Blatchley was born in Hendon. At twelve years of age he was diagnosed with rheumatic fever and spent the next three years bedridden. During this time he sketched designs for cars and built models of them.

Blatchley failed his entrance examinations to Cambridge University; his parents sent him to the Chelsea School of Engineering and then to the Regent Street Polytechnic.

== Career ==
=== Gurney Nutting ===
While still a student, Blatchley's ability was recognized by A. F. McNeil of J Gurney Nutting & Co Limited. McNeil became Blatchley's teacher, mentor, and friend for many years. Gurney Nutting hired Blatchley upon his graduation in 1935.

Blatchley started at Gurney Nutting by preparing concept drawings for customer approval. In 1936, at the age of twenty-three, he replaced McNeil as Chief Designer when McNeil left Gurney Nutting for James Young & Co.

=== Rolls-Royce ===
Unable to fight during World War II due to a heart murmur, Blatchley was moved to Rolls-Royce Aero Design headquarters in Hucknall, Nottinghamshire. He described the work as "intensely boring". Towards the end of the war, Rolls-Royce's auto division had prepared a postwar car which was to have its own factory-supplied bodywork, all-steel simplify construction. Blatchley, who had moved to the Design office in their Experimental Department in Belper, Derbyshire, refined the new body's design externally and designed the passenger compartment. This design first appeared in 1946 as the Bentley Mark VI. It appeared in 1949 as the first Rolls-Royce with a standard steel body, the Silver Dawn. Enlarged with an extended boot and wings, the Bentley R Type followed in 1952, the updated rear end appearing on the Rolls-Royce Silver Dawn at the same time. These postwar cars finally took the top-people's-carriage trade away from Daimler.

Work began on the Corniche II (Bentley Continental) project in 1950. After his retirement, Blatchley disclaimed any involvement in the final design though he admitted to having worked on some initial suggestions. He said it was Ivan Evernden's concept inspired by the 1938 Embiricos Bentley. Evernden worked with Stanley Watts and George Moseley of H. J. Mulliner & Co. on the final details.

In September 1951 the Styling Office was officially formed as a separate department from the Experimental Department. Blatchley was appointed Chief Styling Engineer and moved to the Styling Department's offices at the Crewe works. In 1952 the responsibility for external styling of Park Ward coachwork was transferred to Crewe. Development of new models continued but the designs presented to the board meeting which would decide on the new model to be introduced in 1955 were rejected as being too modern. In the space of a week Blatchley produced a complete new concept to the board's requirements and it was immediately accepted. This became the Silver Cloud and S Type, Rolls-Royce's last standard models based on a separate chassis.

The last standard model car he was associated with was the unitary construction Silver Shadow and Bentley T Type. As Chief Stylist of Park Ward he designed what proved to be a short run of half a dozen of their bodies on the Bentley Continental chassis. He is also credited with the design of the Rolls-Royce Corniche announced after his retirement by Mulliner Park Ward in 1971. As at 2009, one of these Corniches remained in use as the Imperial Processional Car of the Emperor of Japan.

Blatchley and his team developed the shape of the following designs, the two brands being virtually identical over the span:

- Bentley Mark VI (under Ivan Evernden)
- Bentley R Type and Rolls-Royce Silver Dawn
- Bentley S1 and Rolls-Royce Silver Cloud
- Bentley T-series and Rolls-Royce Silver Shadow
- Rolls-Royce Corniche

Of Blatchley's leadership qualities, his deputy Bill Allen recalls "I had only five bosses during my career of 49 years and John was the best. He had that quality of leadership which tends to defy analysis; once I saw this described as 'the art that conceals the art'. Whatever problems he had with those superior in rank to him were never allowed to disturb the even temperament and quiet confidence with which he dealt with us".

Inevitable changes in management style frustrated Blatchley and he missed his former freedom of action. Blatchley retired on 21 March 1969 at the age of 55, being succeeded by Fritz Feller an Austrian-born engineer. In 1970, he moved to Hastings, East Sussex, where he remained in retirement for almost 40 years.

Before BMW put their Rolls-Royce Phantom into production, they asked Blatchley for his opinion on the car. He approved. "BMW showed me their possible designs; there was literally only one I thought was any good, and it's the one they've built. I think they've done a marvellous job."

== Personal life ==
Blatchley married Willow Sands in 1939. The couple had two sons.

Blatchley died in Hastings, East Sussex, on 16 February 2008.

== Gallery ==
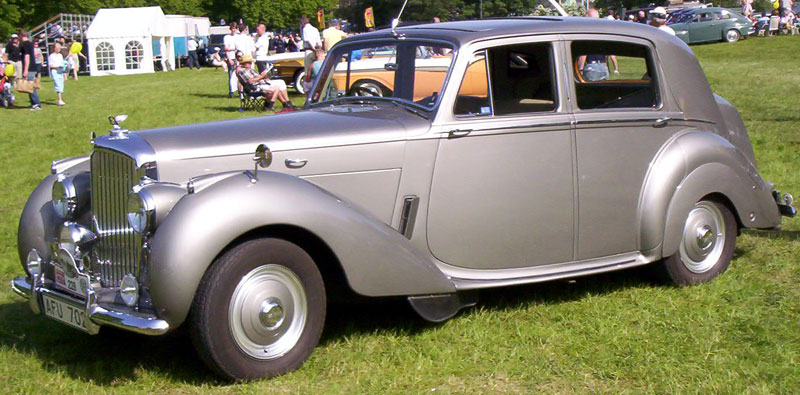
1952 Bentley Mark VI

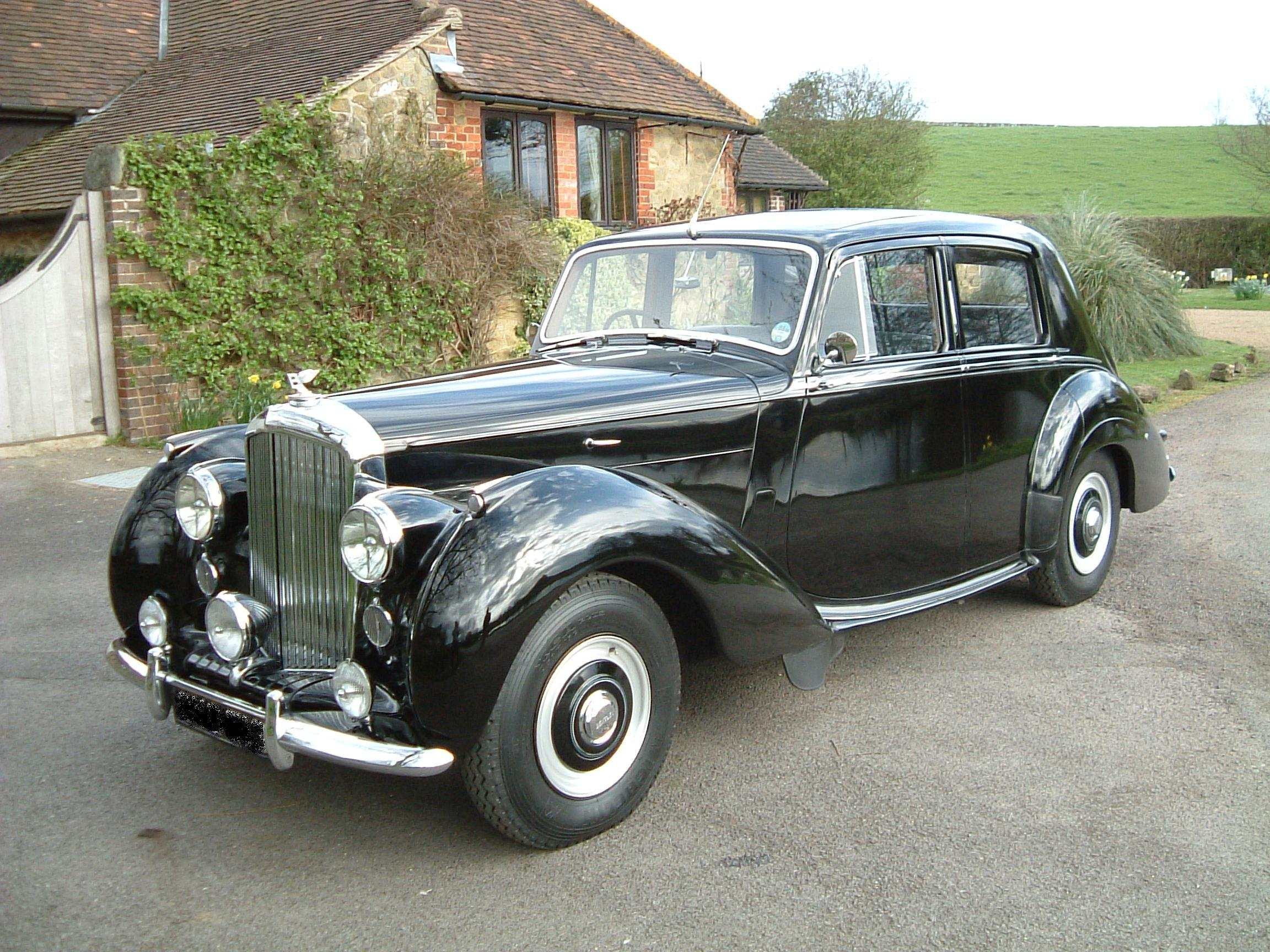
Bentley R Type

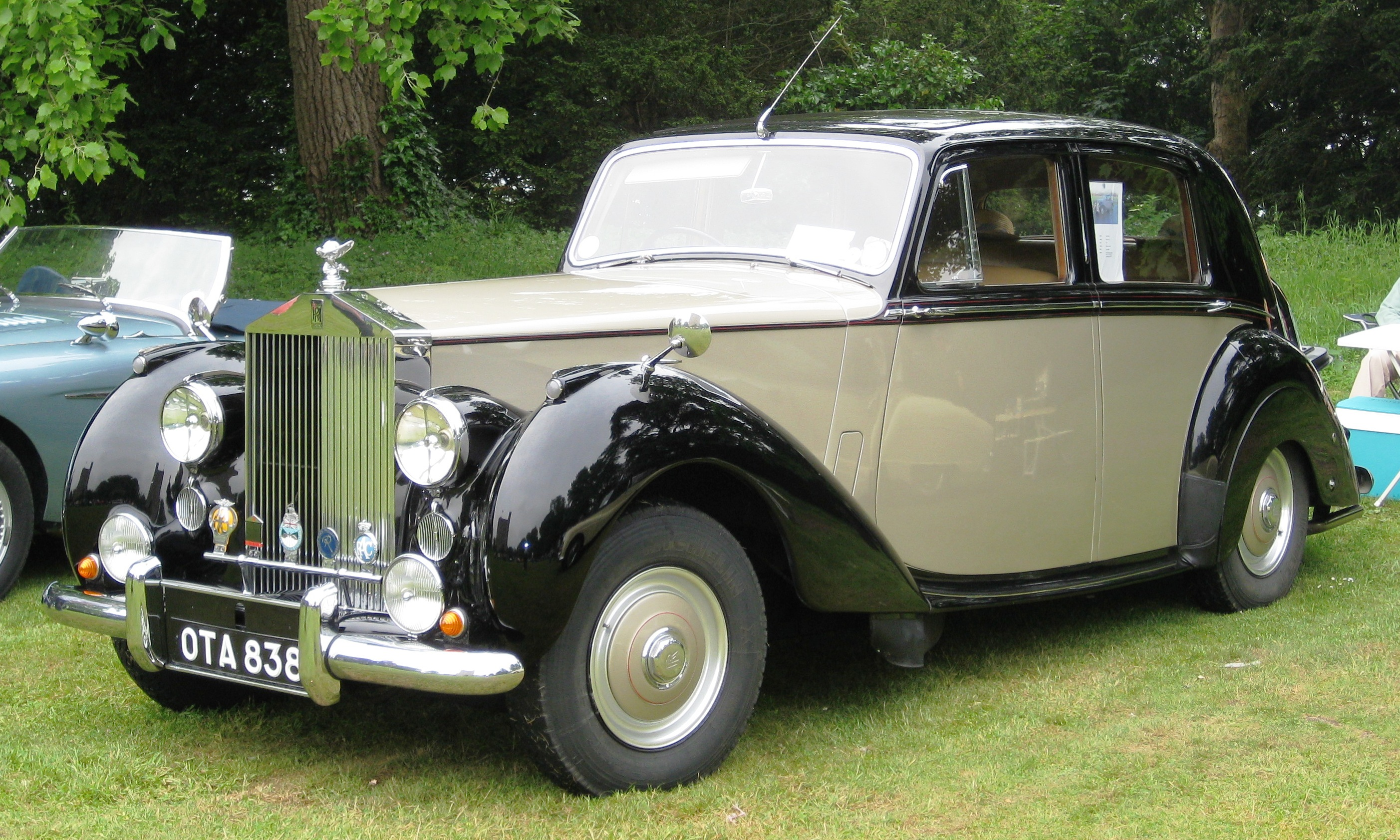
1953 Rolls-Royce Silver Dawn

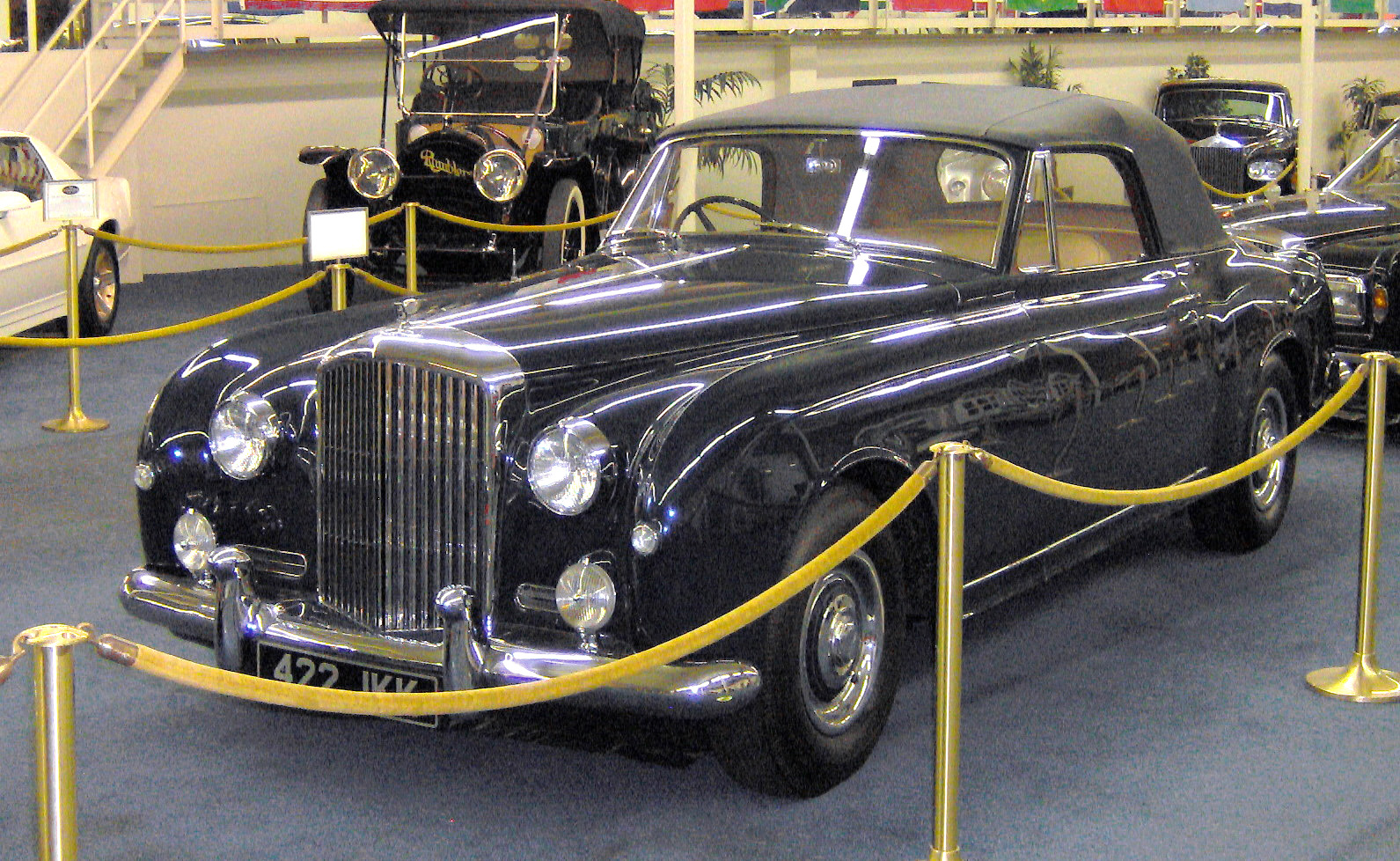
Bentley S1 Continental
drophead coupé
Park Ward 1955

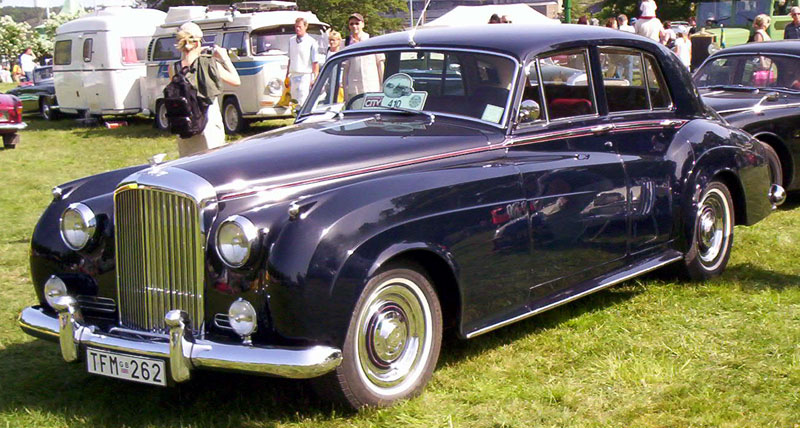
Bentley S1

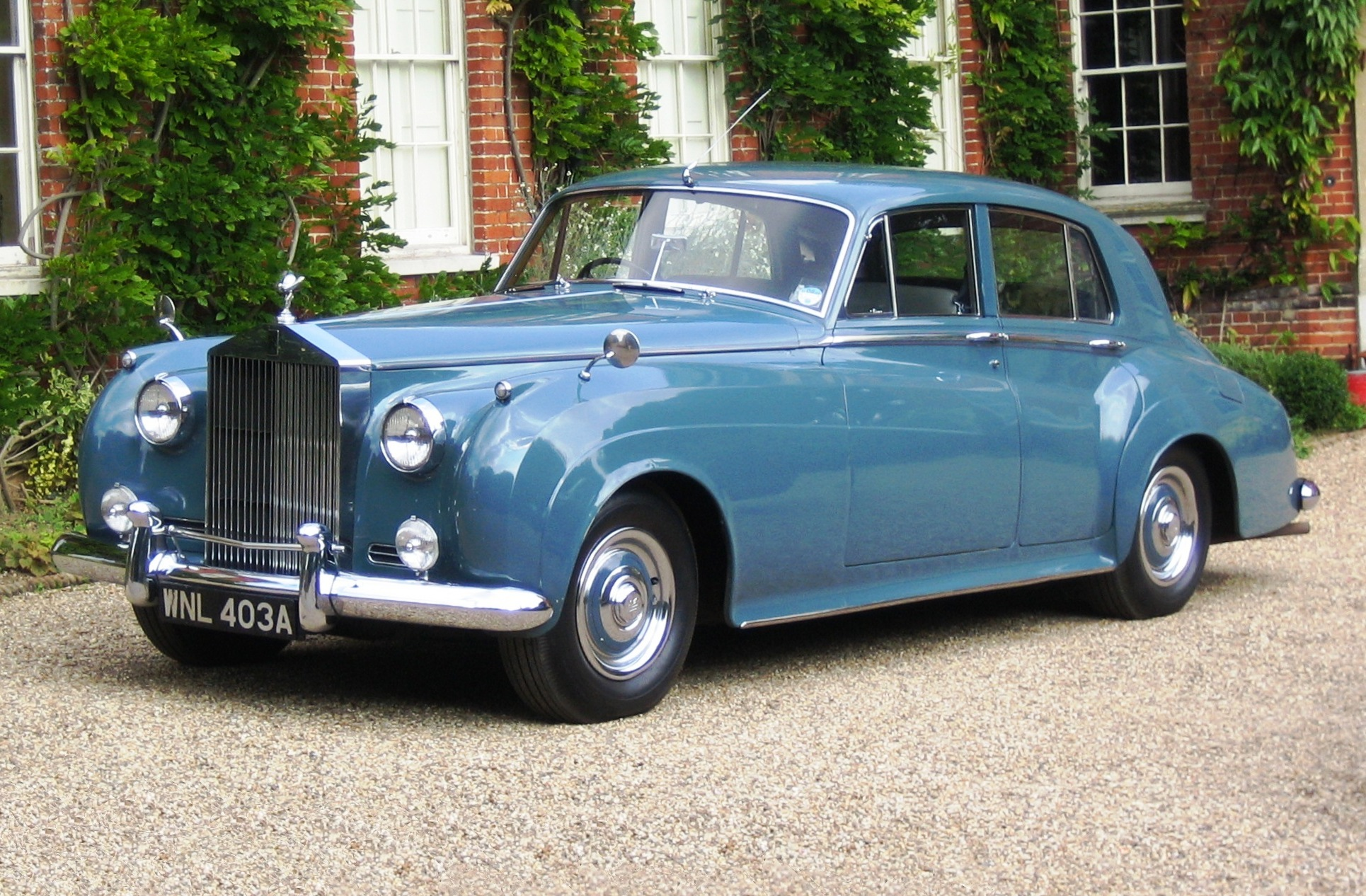
1959 Rolls-Royce Silver Cloud

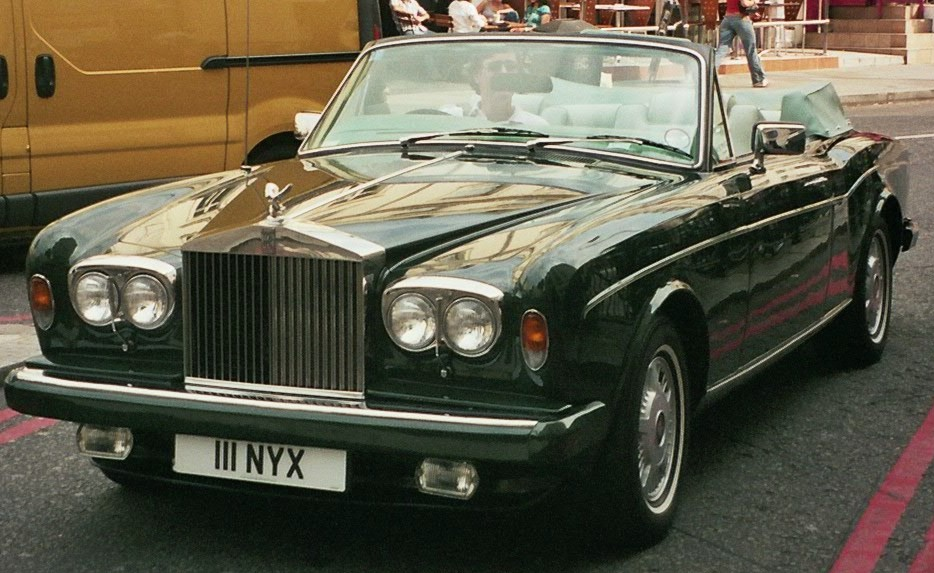
Rolls-Royce Corniche
drophead coupé
Mulliner-Park Ward 1971

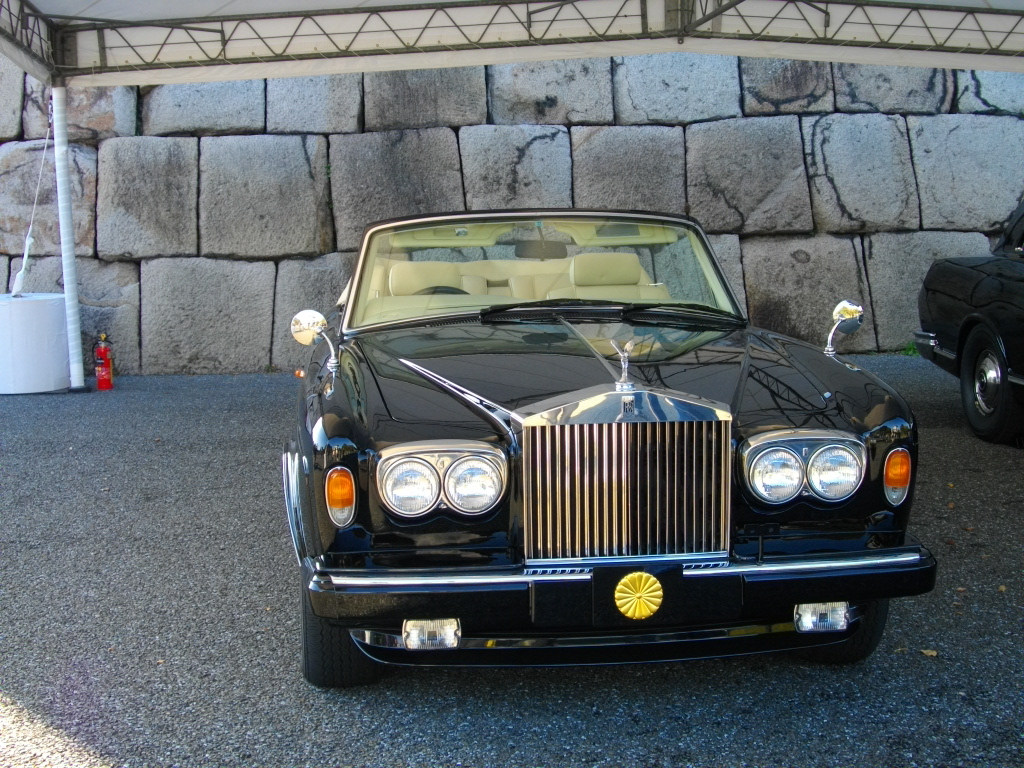
Rolls-Royce Corniche
Imperial Processional Car
The Emperor of Japan

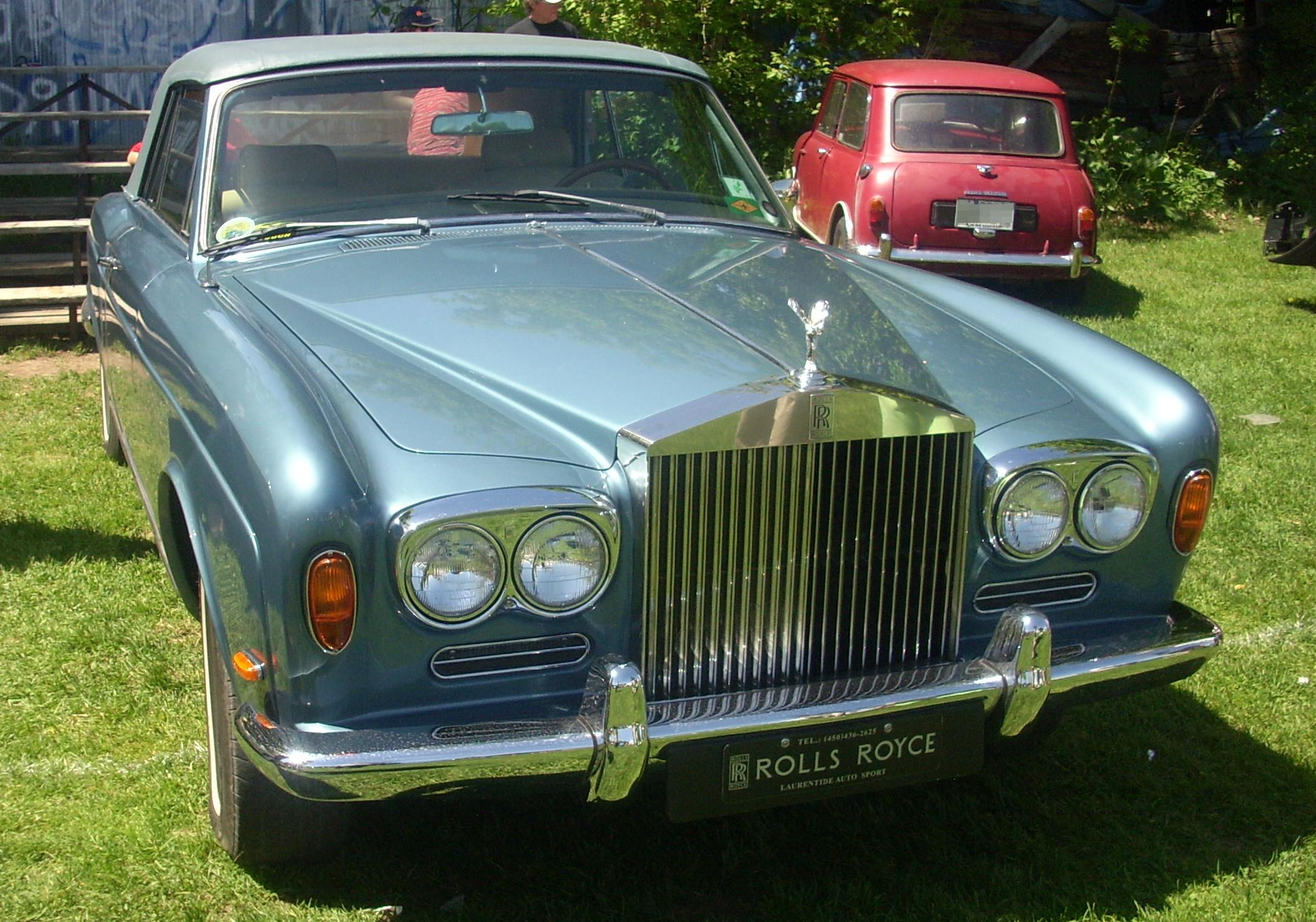
1975 Rolls-Royce Corniche

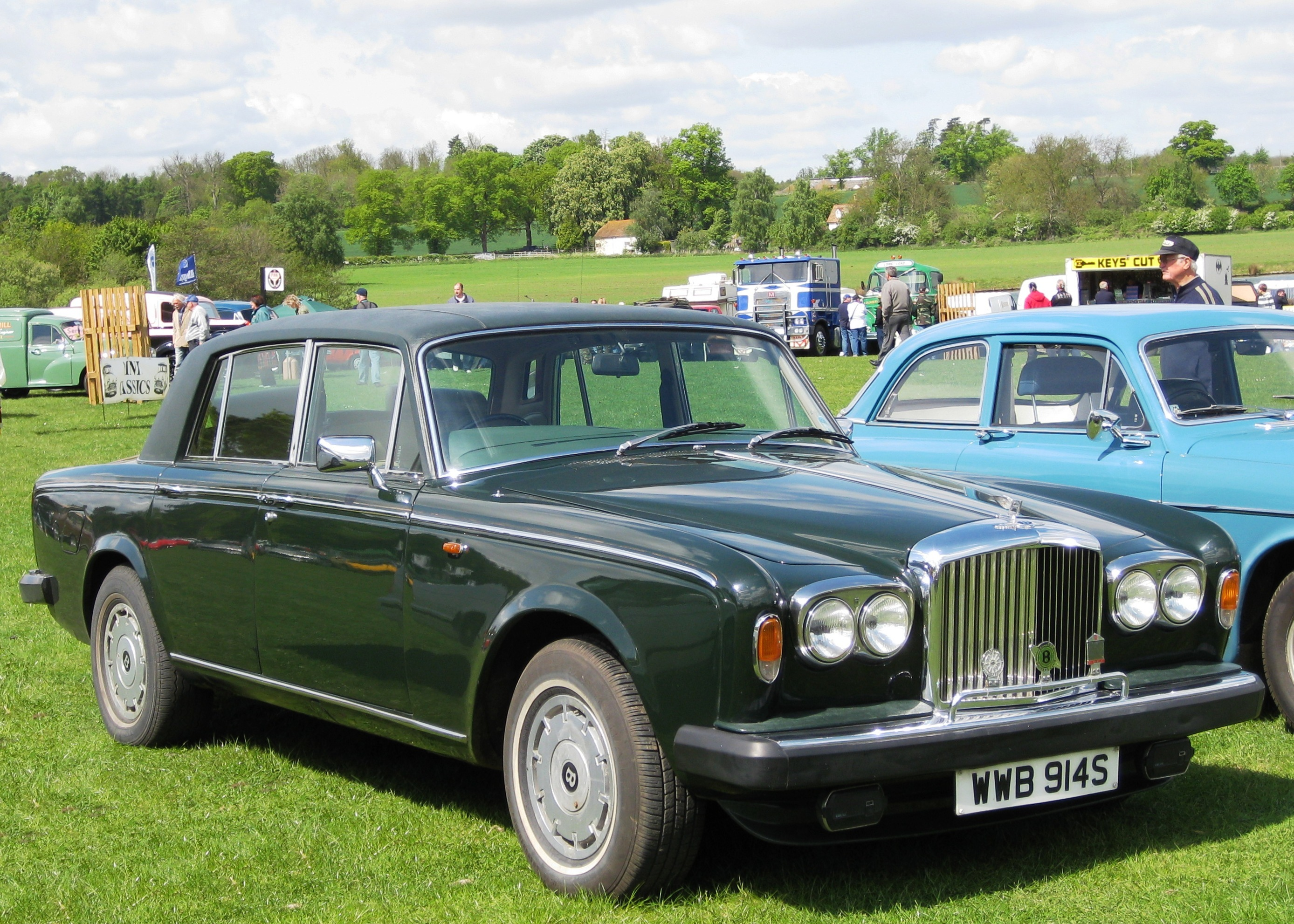
1977 Bentley T (T2 LWB)
