= Bentley Mark VI =

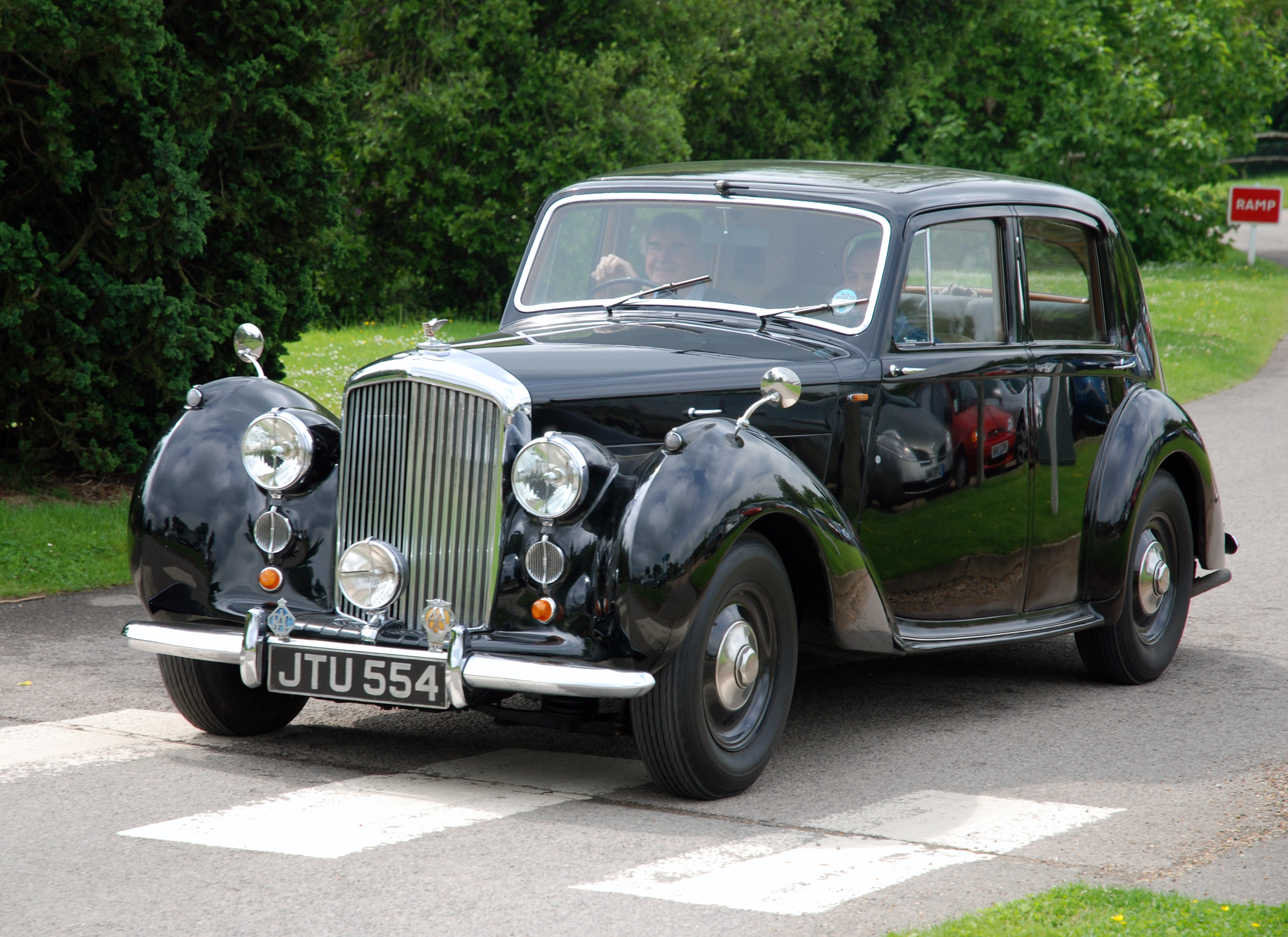
- 1947 standard steel sports saloon

Overview
- Manufacturer: Bentley Motors Limited (1931)
- Production: 1946–1952; 5208 produced
- Assembly: United Kingdom: Crewe, England (Bentley Crewe)

Body and chassis
- Class: Full-size luxury car
- Body style: 4-door saloon; 2-door saloon; 2-door drophead coupé; chassis only (for coachbuilt bodies)
- Layout: FR layout
- Related: Rolls-Royce Silver Dawn

Powertrain
- Engine: 4 1/4-litre 4.3 L (260 cu in) I6; 4 1/2-litre 4.6 L (280 cu in) I6
- Transmission: 4-speed manual

Dimensions
- Wheelbase: 120 in (3,048 mm)
- Length: 192 in (4,877 mm)
- Width: 70 in (1,778 mm)
- Height: 64.5 in (1,638 mm)
- Kerb weight: 4,078 lb (1,850 kg)

Chronology
- Predecessor: Mark V
- Successor: R Type

The Bentley Mark VI is an automobile from Bentley which was produced from 1946 until 1952.

The Mark VI 4-door standard steel sports saloon was the first post-war luxury car from Bentley. Announced in May 1946 and produced from 1946 to 1952 it was also both the first car from Rolls-Royce with all-steel coachwork and the first complete car assembled and finished at their factory. These very expensive cars were a genuine success; long-term, their weakness lay in the inferior steels forced on them by government's post-war controls.

In 1944 Rolls-Royce executive W. A. Robotham saw that there would be limited postwar demand for a Rolls-Royce or Bentley rolling chassis with a body from a specialist coachbuilder, and negotiated with the Pressed Steel Company a contract for a general-purpose body to carry four people in comfort on their postwar chassis behind a Rolls-Royce or Bentley radiator. Though he stretched the demand to 2000 per year, Pressed Steel were "nonplussed" by the small demand. Chassis continued to be supplied to independent coachbuilders, which produced four-door saloon, two-door saloon and drophead coupe models. Out of the coachbuilt cars the most sought after now are the 241 cars built by H.J. Mulliner. A single 1950 Standard Steel bodied MkVI chassis B39HP registration LLP 769 was supplied new converted internally by Mulliner into a six-seater limousine supplied to L.S. Lambourne Esq. The ex factory price was £2595 plus £140 for the outsourced conversion by Mulliner of the front seat to accommodate the wind up glass division in the custom bench seat.

This first Bentley factory finished car was given the name Bentley Mark VI standard steel sports saloon. This shorter wheelbase chassis and engine was a variant of the Rolls-Royce Silver Wraith of 1946 and, with the same standard steel body, became the cautiously introduced Silver Dawn of 1949. In 1952 both Rolls-Royce Silver Dawn and Bentley Mk VI standard steel bodies were modified to incorporate a boot of about twice the size and the result became known as the R Type, based on the chassis number at which the change took place. The name of the Rolls-Royce Silver Dawn was not changed after the modification that started with the "E" series in these cars.

A very few Mark VI engines and chassis were modified to provide higher performance and sold to be bodied by selected coachbuilders as the first Bentley Continentals (see below).

== Engine ==
The Mark VI 4 1/4-litre used an F-head straight-6 engine 4.3 L (4,257 cc/259 cu in) in size. The manufacturer refused to disclose a horse power value for the car (other than Tax Horsepower of 29.4 hp according to the old RAC formula) but an Autocar Magazine road test reproduced in 1950 reported that top gear provided "flexibility down to 6 mph (10 km/h)" and the ability to "climb a hill of 1 in 9 maximum gradient, complicated by bends", all of which supported the manufacturer's contention that power, along with low speed torque, were adequate.

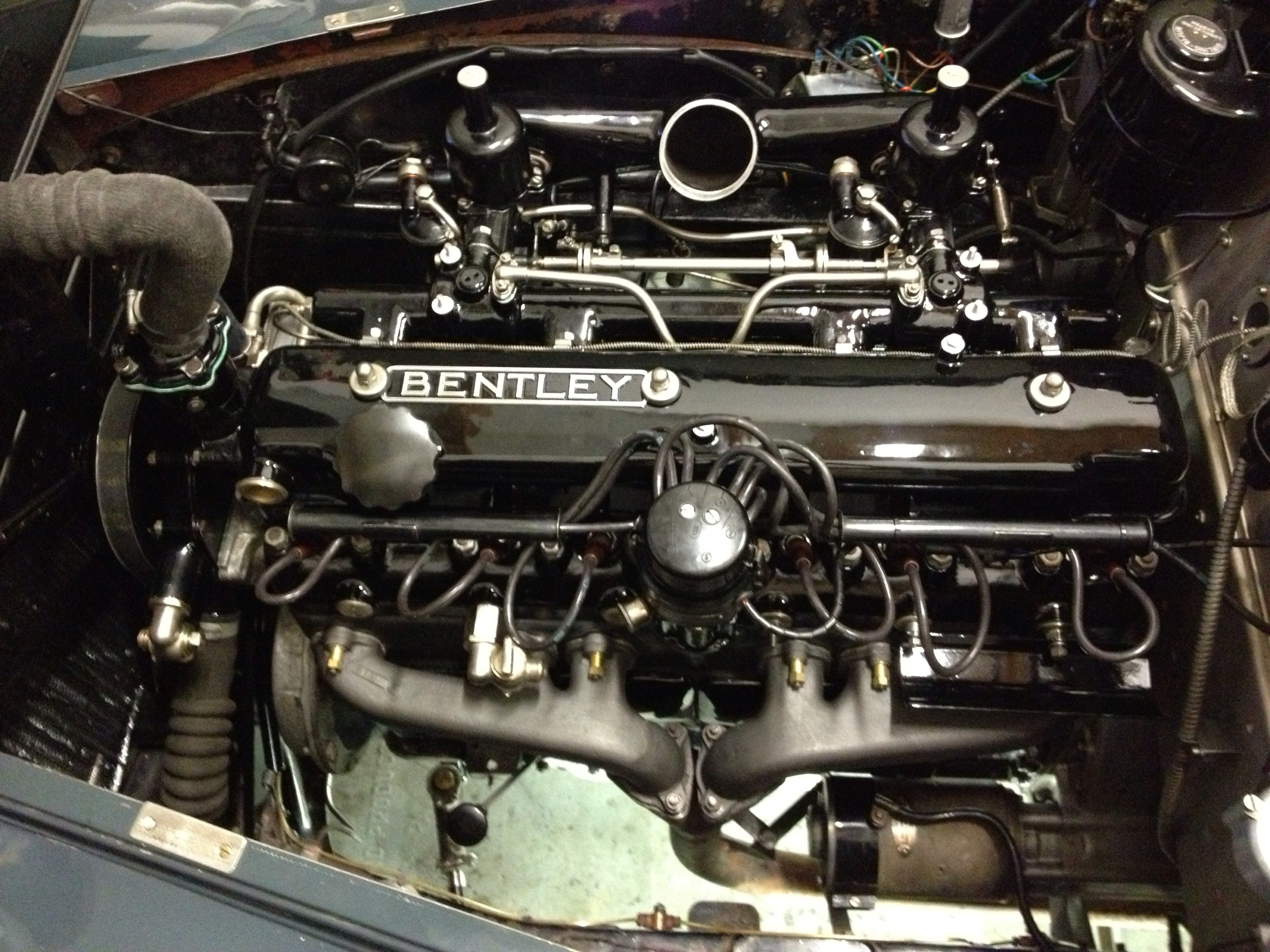
a 4¼ Litre engine

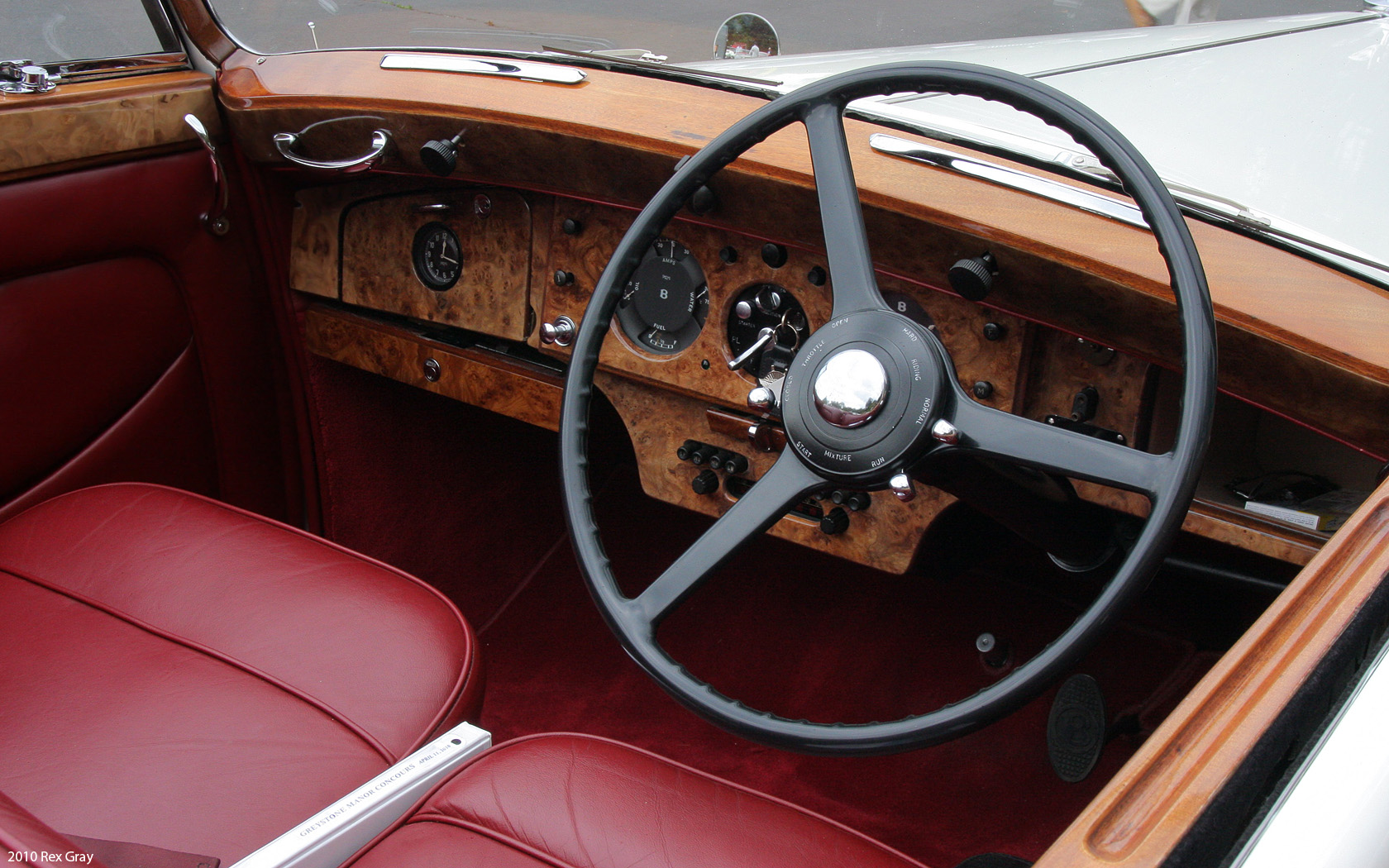
Interior

In 1951, a 4 1/2-litre, 4.6 L (4,566 cc/278 cu in) version of the engine was introduced. The increase in displacement was accomplished by increasing the bore from 3 1/2-inch to 3 5/8 inch. The later version is sometimes casually referred to as the "big bore" engine, the earlier version as the "small bore" version. The 4 1/2 L version of the engine is as well equipped with a Vokes 30 (later: Vokes 62) full flow oil filter (some earlier 4 1/4 L cars have since been modified to a full flow filtration system).

Carburation in RHD (right hand drive) cars were two horizontal constant-vacuum SU carburetors (type H4 up to B81HP, type H6 from B83 HP on). LHD (left hand drive) cars had a single dual downdraught Stromberg carburetor type AAV26M and a different inlet manifold as fitted in the Rolls-Royce Silver Dawn and Silver Wraith.

A four-speed synchromesh manual transmission was fitted in all Bentley MK VI with the change lever to the right of the driver on RHD cars and on the column on LHD versions.

4 1/4-litre cars had chassis numbers from B 1 AJ through B 400 LJ, with the final two letters indicating the series in which it was built. The "big bore" cars serial numbers begin with B 1 MB (although B 2 MD was the first big bore Mark VI built) and ended with B 300 PV (although B 301 PU was the last one built). Each alphabetic series only contained either even or odd numbers, and 13 was always skipped for the odd-numbered sequences.

The 4.3 L (260 cu in) was referred to as the 4 1/4 L and can be quickly identified from its single exhaust in RHD cars. The 4.6 L (280 cu in) is known as the 4 1/2 L and features a twin exhaust in RHD cars. In LHD cars the (much less restrictive) twin exhaust system was only fitted with the introduction of the R-type. In addition for "standard steel" Mark VI saloons the single hinged ventilation flap centrally mounted on the top of the bonnet, directly ahead of the windscreen was replaced, on later cars, with two hinged ventilation flaps, mounted at or slightly below knee height, one on each side of the bonnet, ahead of the front doors. The oil filler cap is another way to identify engine type; a plastic cap is typical of a "small bore" engine, a metal cap of a "large bore" engine.

== Chassis and running gear ==
The chassis used leaf springs at the rear and independent coil springing at the front. A control on the steering wheel centre adjusts the hardness of the rear springing by hydraulically adjusting the rear dampers. This is done via opening a check valve that provides pressure by diverting transmission oil to the dampers. A pedal-operated central lubrication system type Bijur-Girling allows oil to be applied to moving parts of the suspension from a central reservoir by using a foot pedal. The 12.25 in (311 mm) drum brakes were assisted by the traditional Rolls-Royce mechanical servo at the transmission.

== Standard Steel Saloon ==
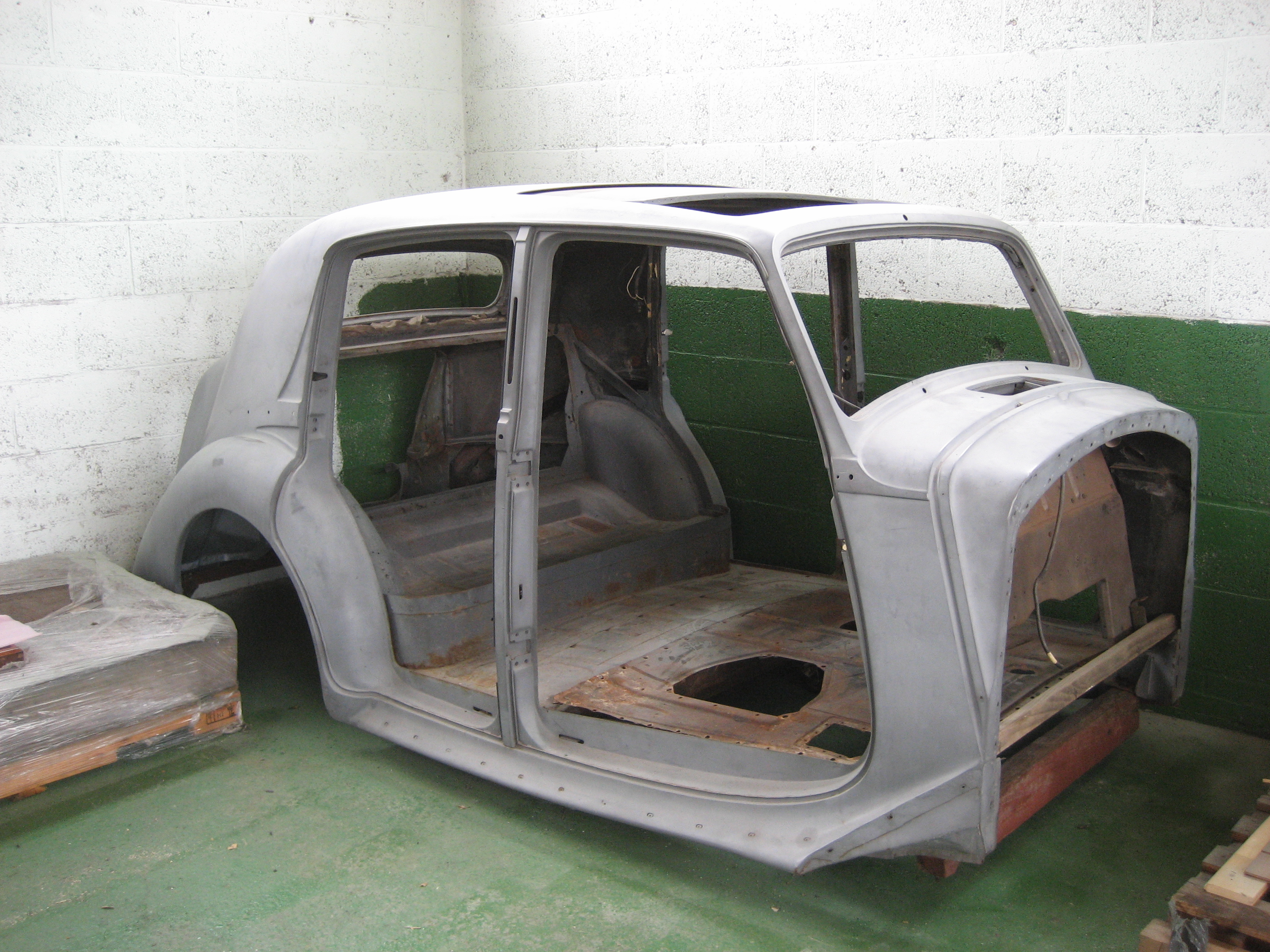
The all steel body of an early Mark VI

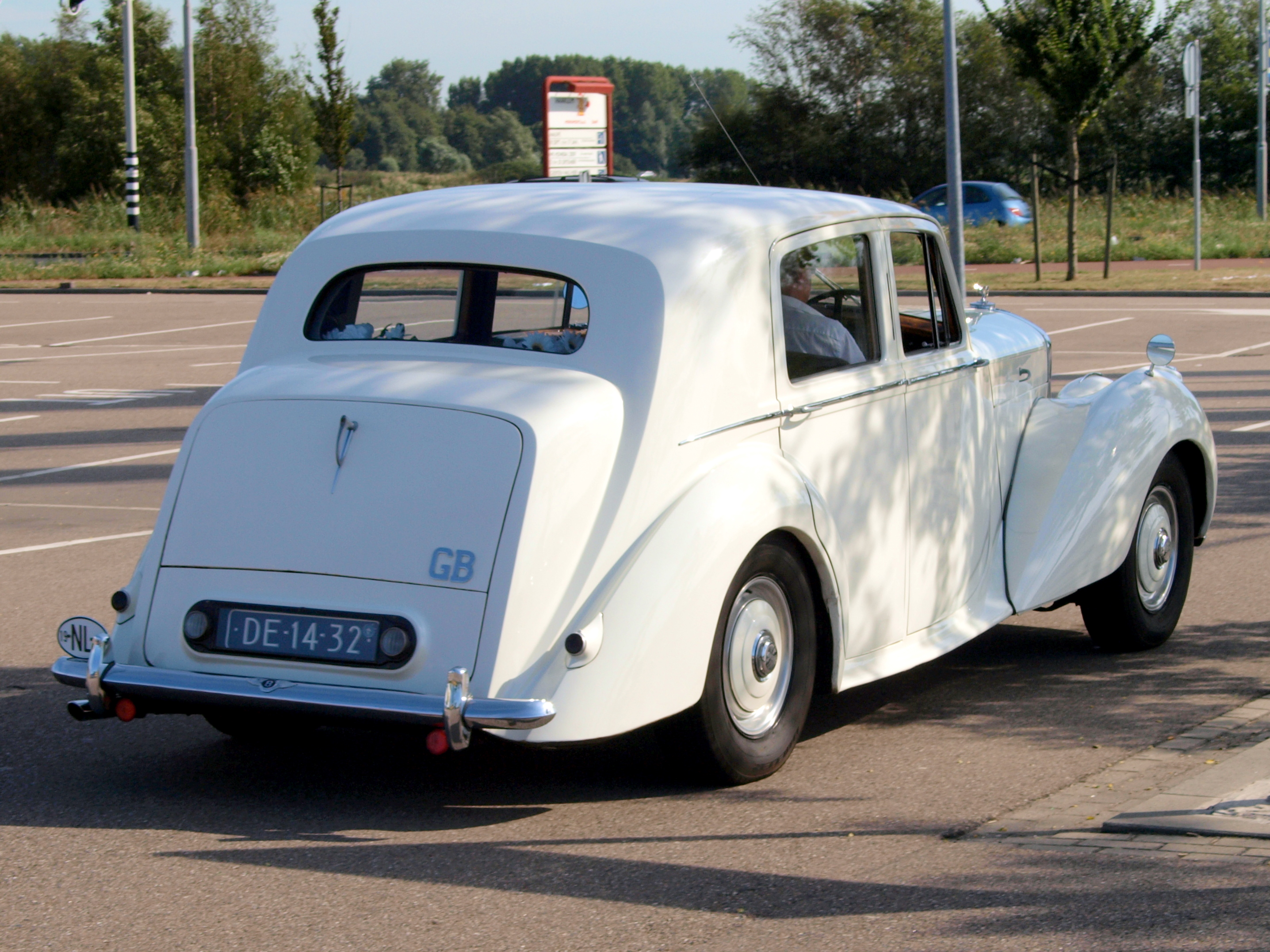
Bentley Mark VI "standard steel" saloon, rear three quarters

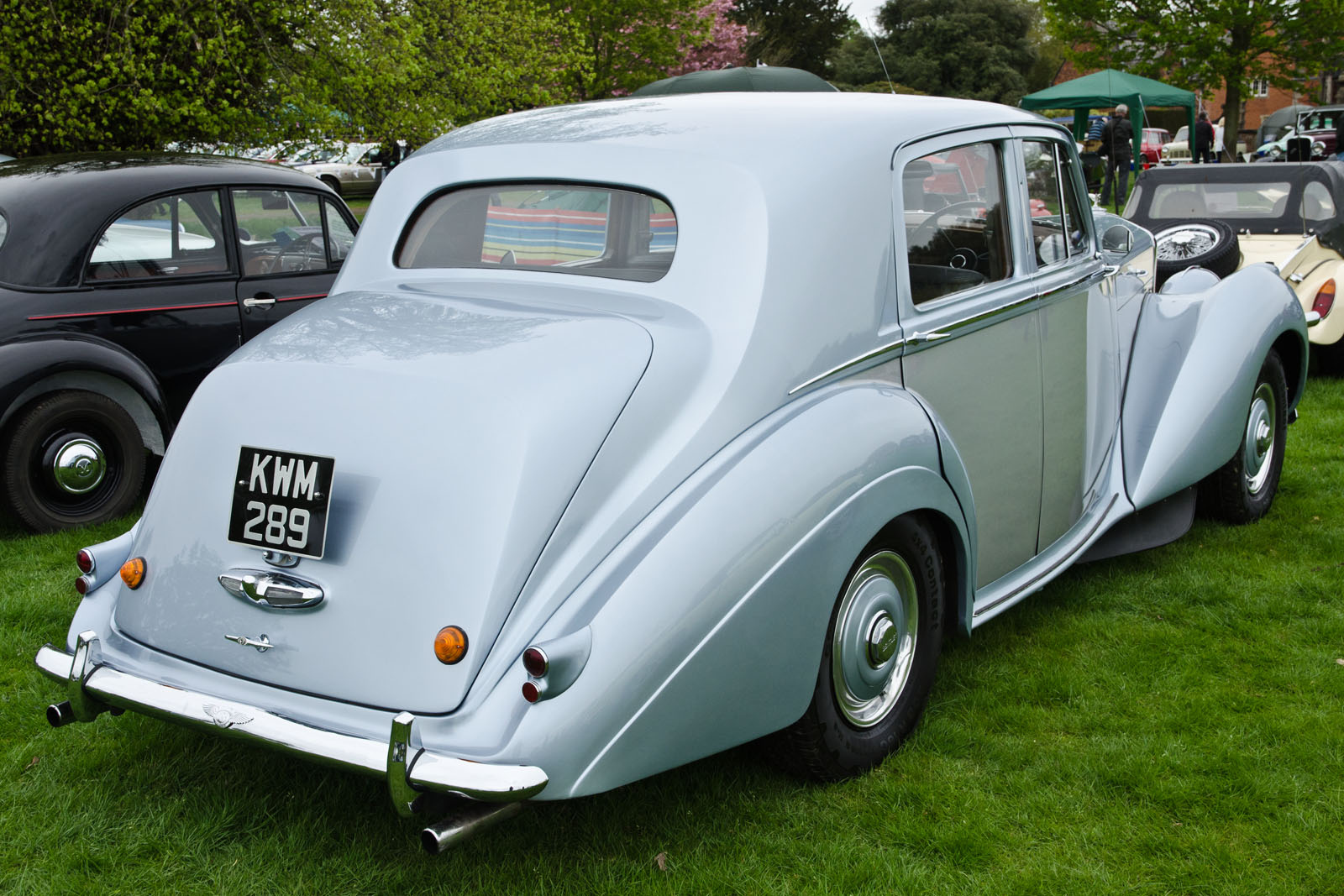
The Bentley R-type replaced the Mark VI towards the end of 1952, inheriting the body shape of the earlier design as far back as the C-pillar. The principal difference was a much larger boot with a larger opening, which reflected changes in car design and usage, especially the key US and "British dominion" export markets, more generally.

Employing its experience with the steel bodies made in short runs since 1936 by then partly-owned subsidiary Park Ward the Car Division of Rolls-Royce offered their lowest priced chassis with a factory-supplied body all-steel so it could be exported all over the world. The factory bodies with a Gurney-Nutting-Blatchley refined shape were made by Pressed Steel Ltd of Cowley and sent to the Bentley works at Crewe for painting and fitting out with traditional wood and leather. They featured rear hinged "suicide" doors at the front with concealed hinges, a sliding sunroof, a permanently closed windscreen with an electric defrosting and demisting unit hidden in the scuttle and a second heater that made use of the coolant and was fitted with an electric fan beneath the left front seat. Twin screen wipers were fitted and provision was made for the fitting of a radio with a short and flexibly mounted aerial that could be swung up above the centre of the screen.

=== Road test ===
A 4.6-litre, factory bodied car tested by The Motor magazine in 1951 had a top speed of 100 mph (160 km/h) and could accelerate from 0-60 mph (97 km/h) in 15.0 seconds. A fuel consumption of 16.5 miles per imperial gallon (17.1 L/100 km; 13.7 mpg_{‑US}) was recorded. The test car cost £4,473 including taxes.

=== Commercial ===
The Mark VI was introduced at a time of steel shortage across Europe which translated into a serious shortage of new cars for sale on the UK market. A Used Car report in 1951 of a three-year-old example with 10,450 miles (16,815 kilometres) on the odometer noted that a car which had, when new, retailed for £4,038 including sales taxes, was now offered for sale at £5,335. This was seen as a comment on the quality of the car but also on the continuing shortage of cars for sale.

By the end of 1952 order-books had shrunk and the Mark VI was replaced by the R-Type, featuring an extended boot/trunk supported by a chassis that was extended by six inches behind the rear wheels. In addition, an automatic transmission option was now available, an automatic choke along with other less visible modifications were added and former export-only options were now available to the home-market. The R-type led up to the introduction of the completely redesigned S series in 1955.

Bentley Mark VI Production volumes:

- 1946-1951 4 1/4 L: 4000 (including 832 with coachbuilt bodies)
- 1951-1952 4 1/2 L: 1202 (including 180 with coachbuilt bodies)

== Bentley Continental ==
A Mark VI chassis (at first referred to within the works as Corniche II) was developed by Ivan Evernden and J P Blatchley in 1950 and 1951 carrying a larger engine with a higher compression ratio and modified fuel and exhaust systems, a close ratio gearbox and much higher final drive ratio.

By special arrangement with Bentley 2-door bodies were fitted having a lower frontal area and of significantly lighter construction, the first – made by H J Mulliner – developed in conjunction with Evernden and Blatchley. The first still luxurious car was more than 10% lighter than the standard car. They were the most expensive production cars in the world and the world's fastest 4/5-seater saloons with a top speed above 120 mph.

These chassis were produced between June 1952 and April 1953 and bear the chassis numbers BC1A to BC26A, with the prototype, totalling 27 cars. The engine compression was reduced on the last 8 cars. The bulk of the chassis were clothed by H J Mulliner but some were bodied in Europe. Only the 27 cars were built before the R designation was added to the chassis series identification.

== Gallery ==
The standard steel saloon and some of the alternatives provided by independent coachbuilders

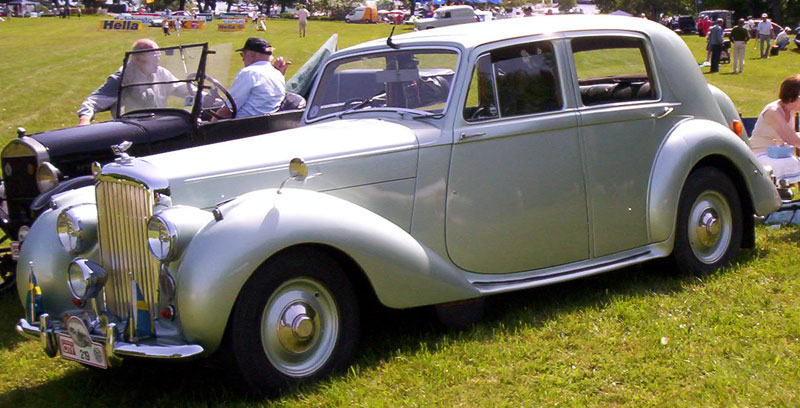
standard steel 4-door
sports saloon

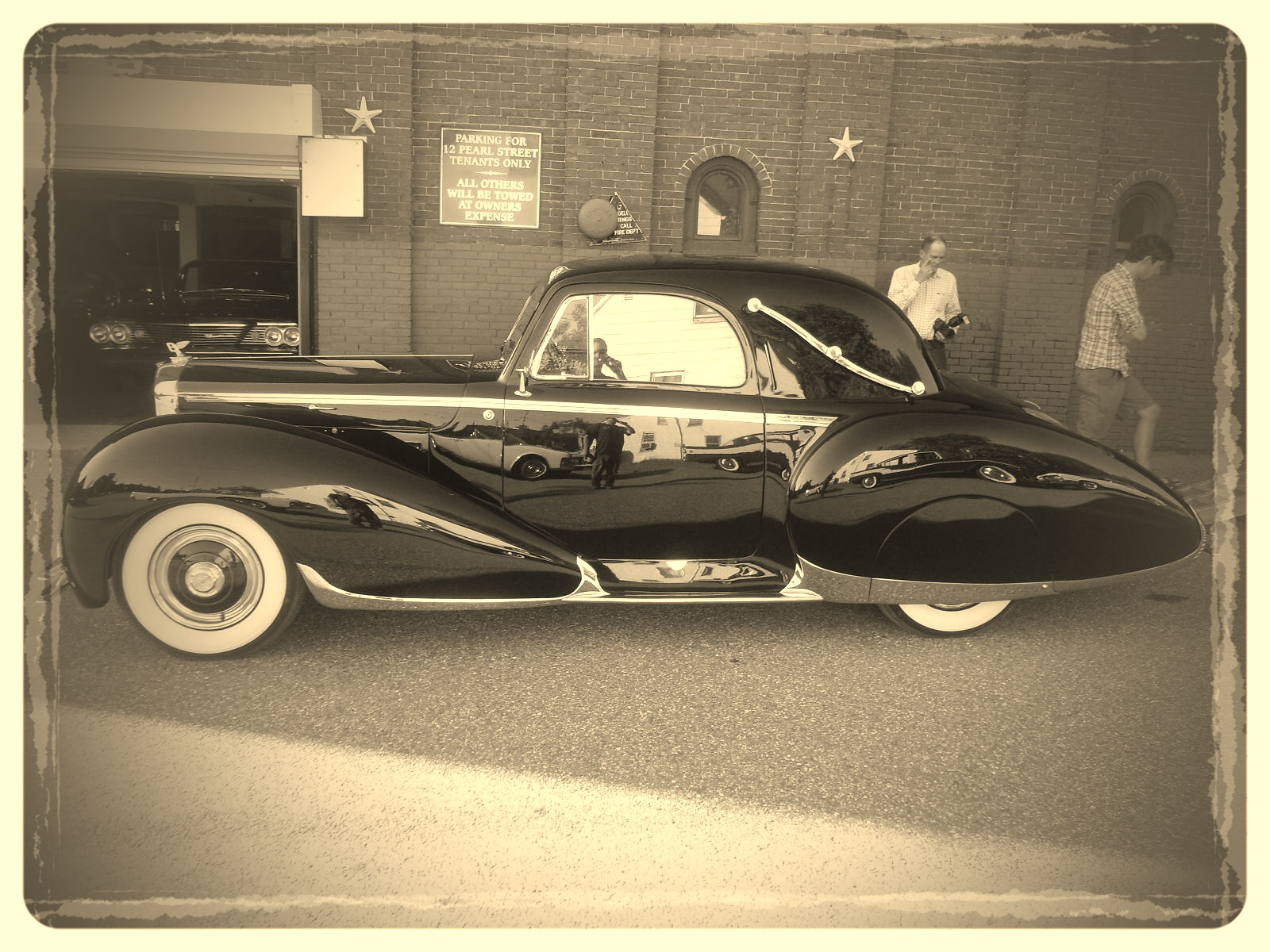
Figoni & Falaschi Paris
fixed-head coupé 1947

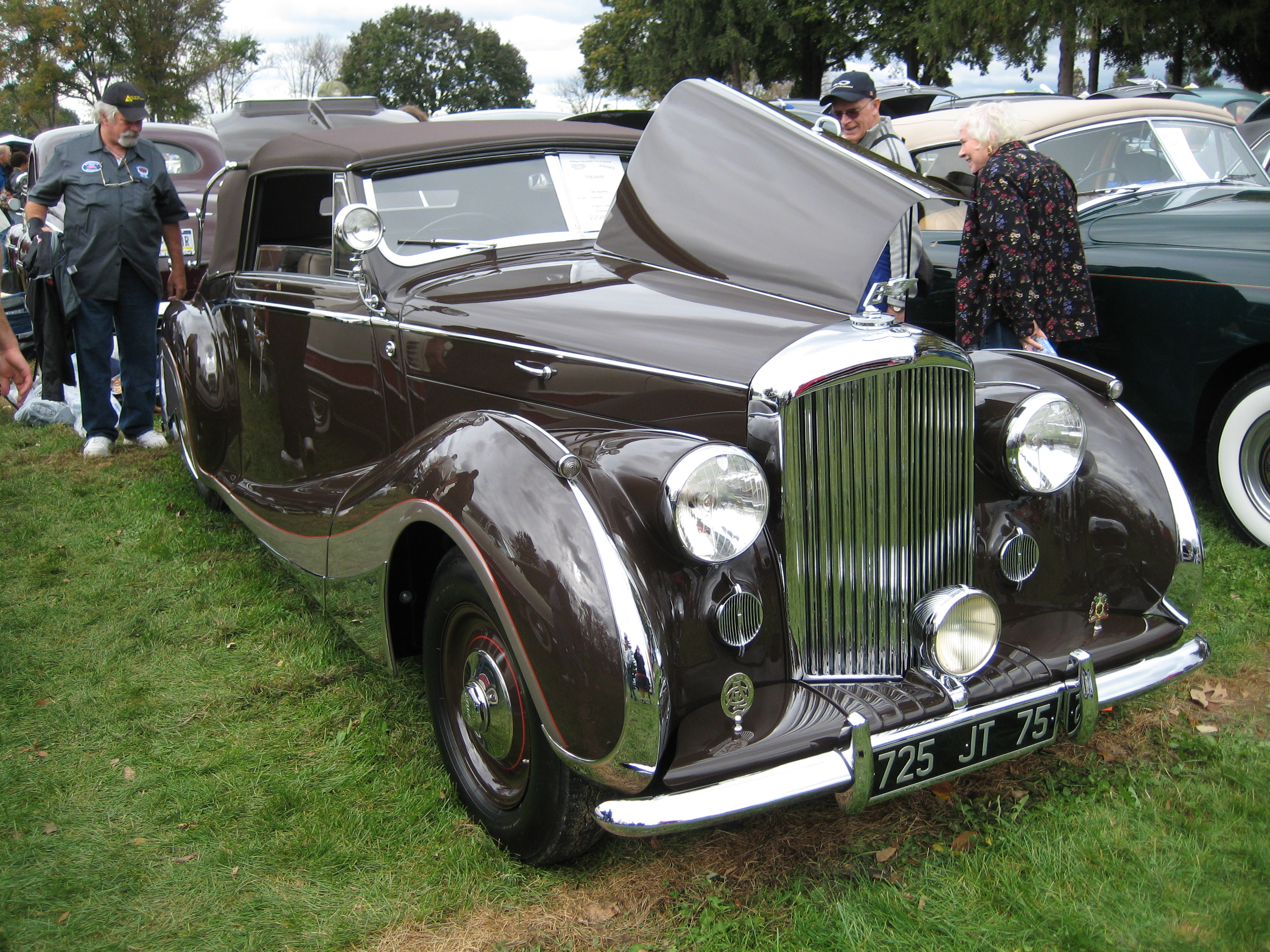
Franay Paris
drop-head coupé 1947

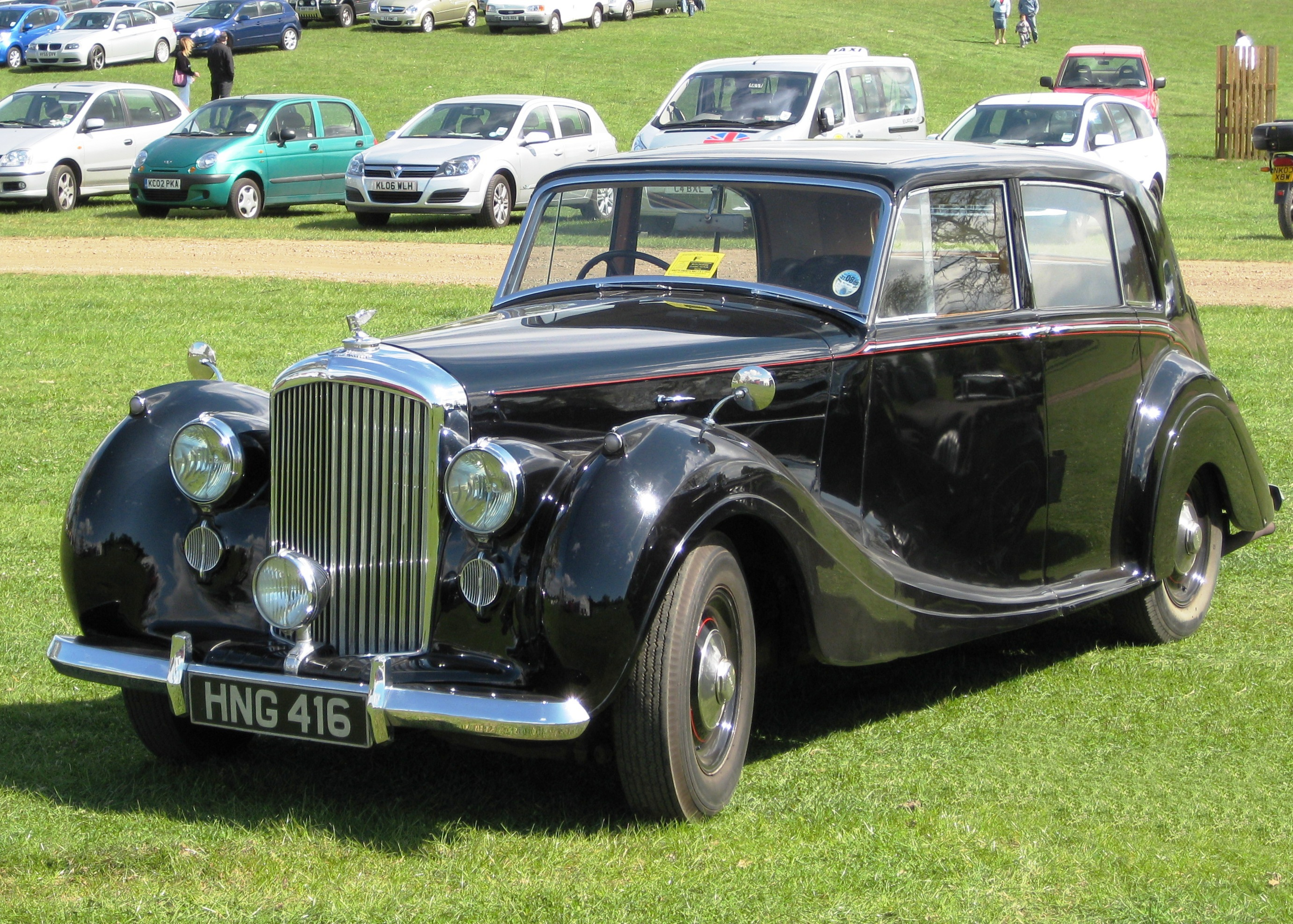
Freestone & Webb
saloon 1947

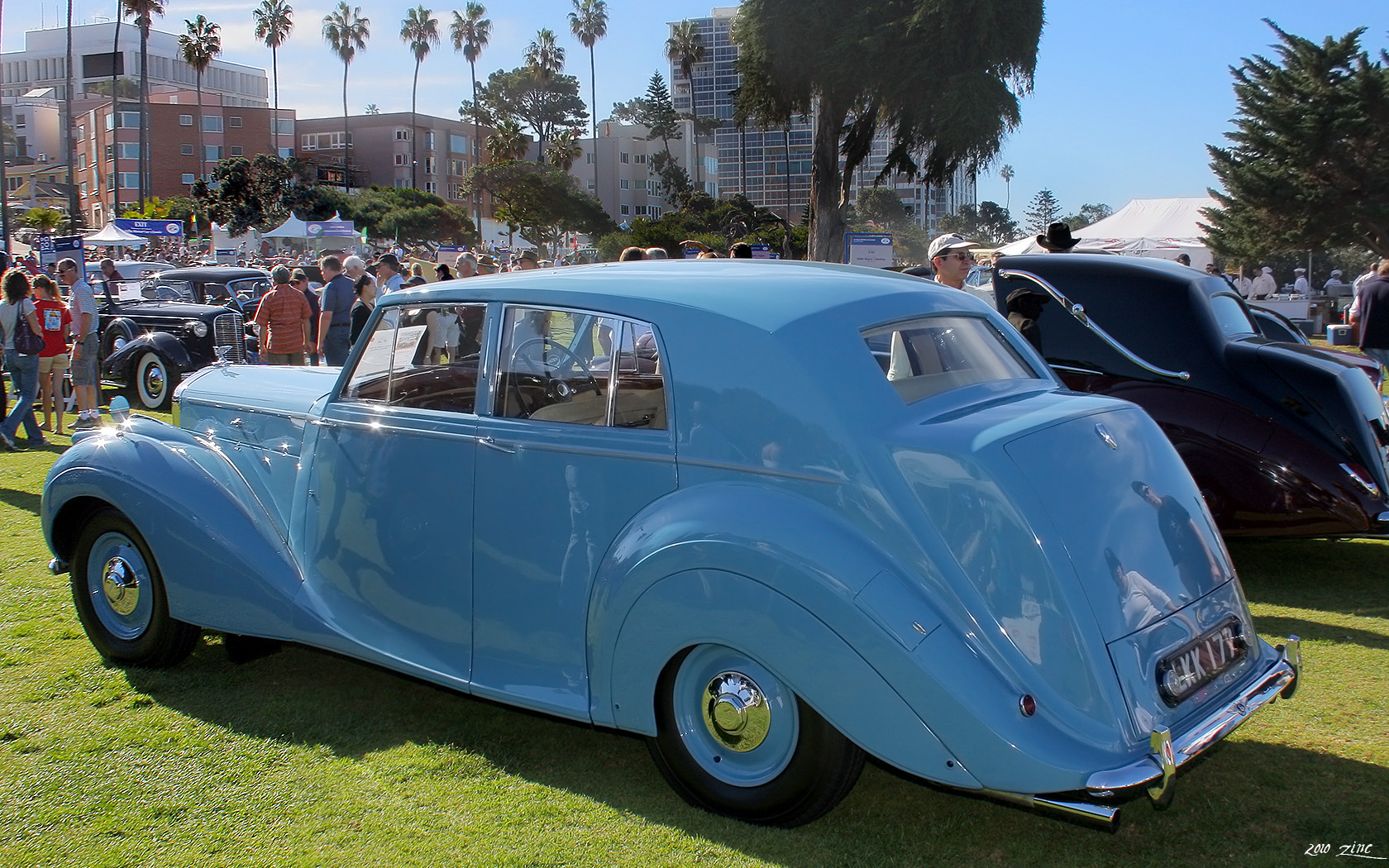
James Young
sports saloon 1948

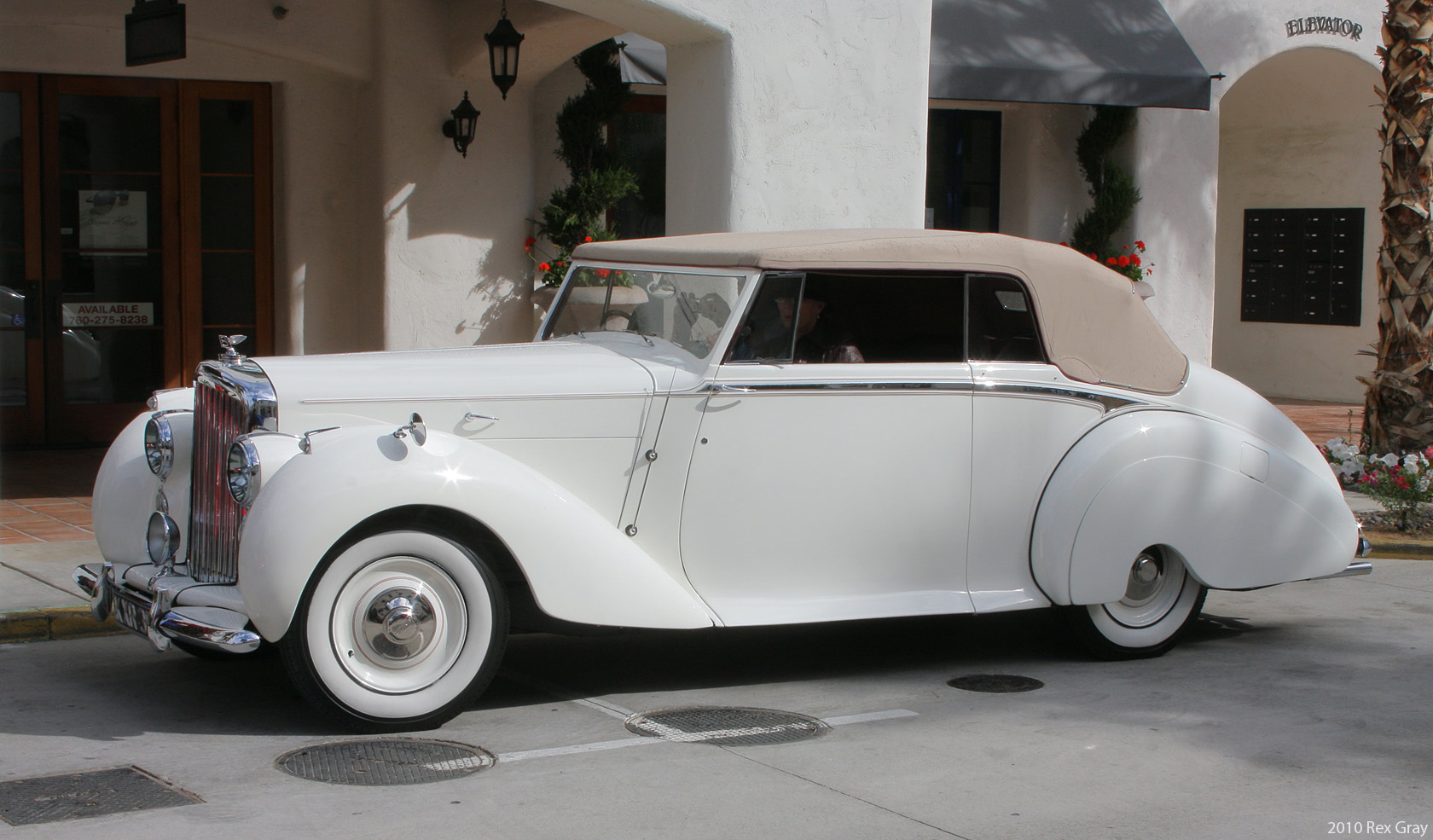
Park Ward
drophead coupé 1949

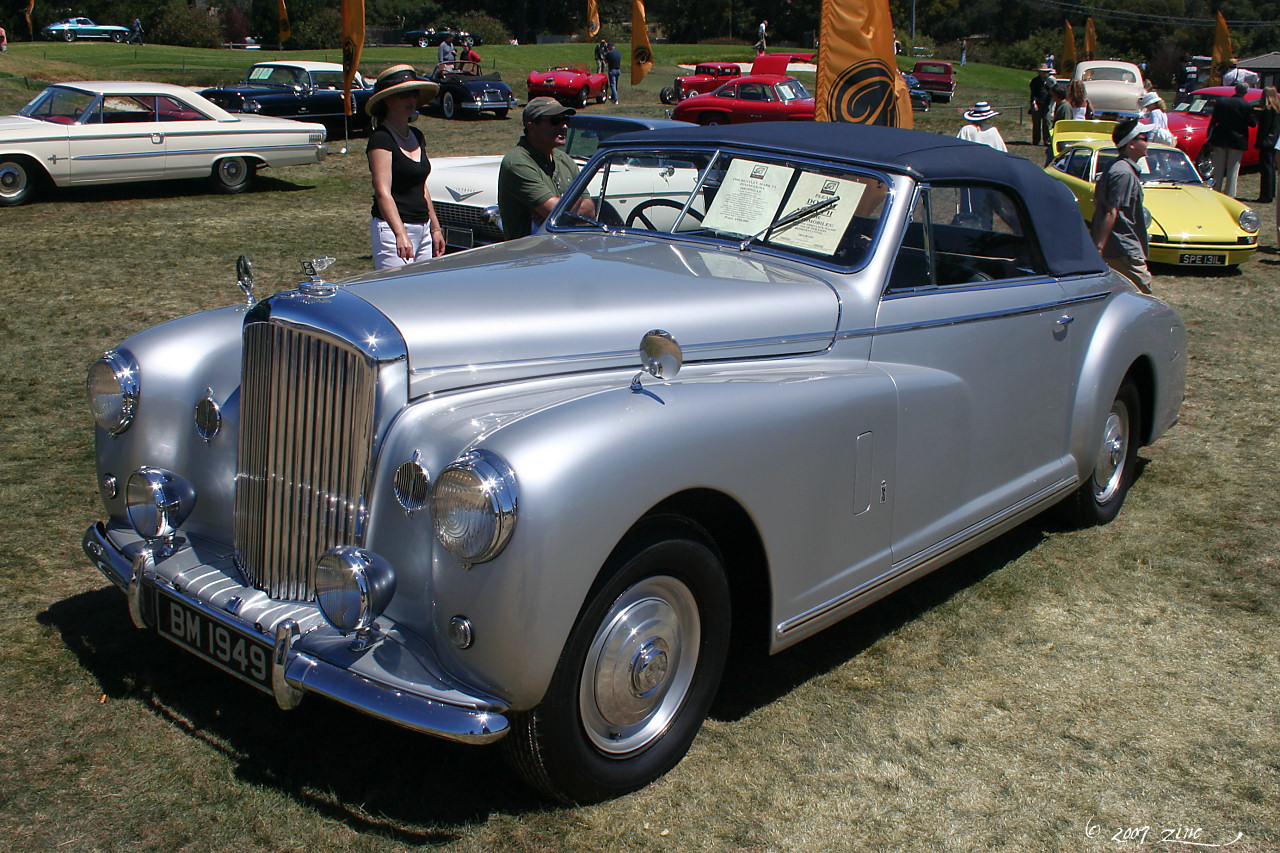
Stabilimenti Farina
drophead coupé 1949

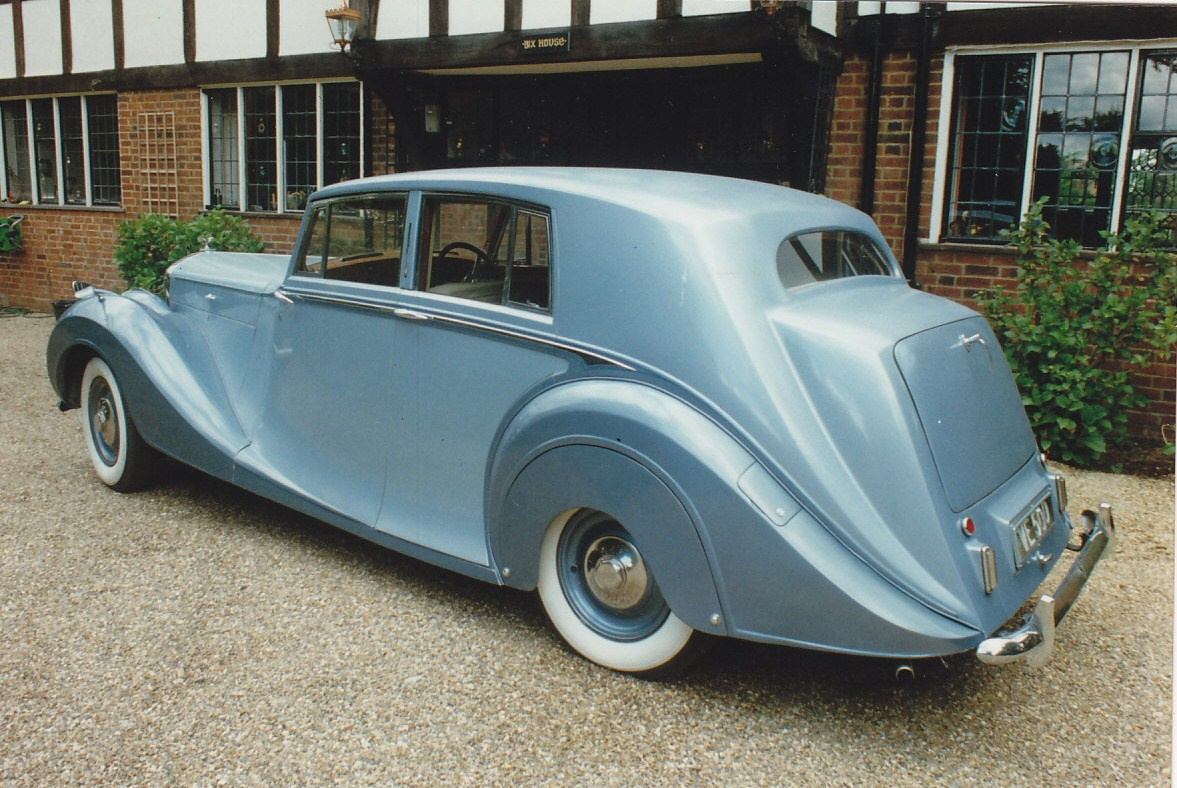
Hooper
sports saloon 1950

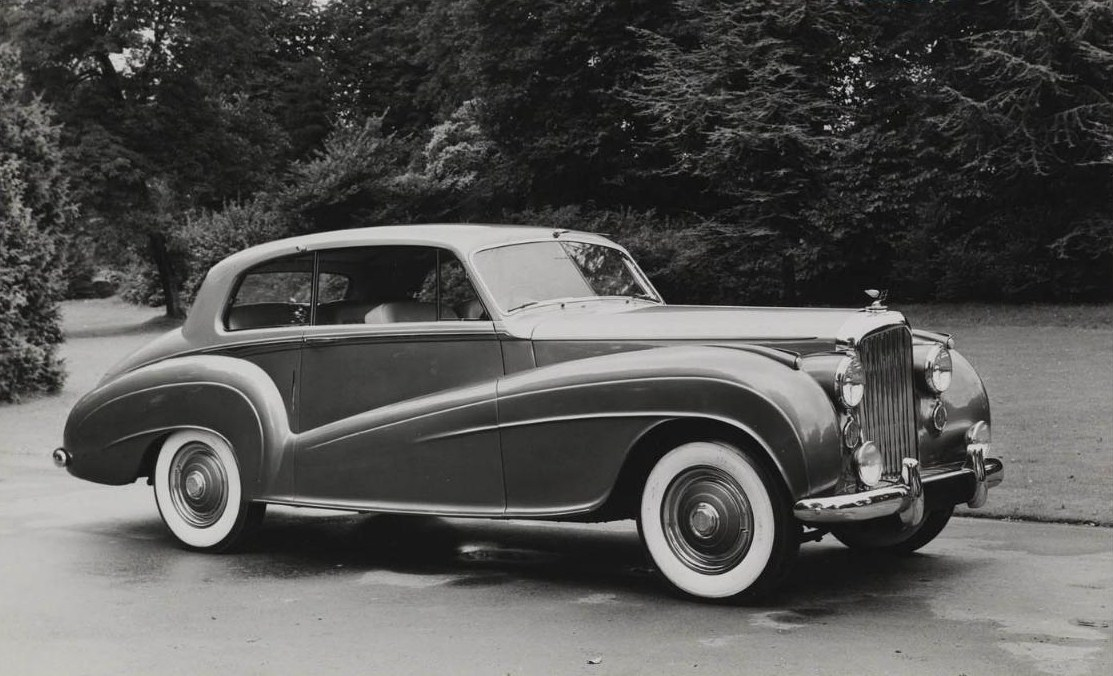
H.J. Mulliner & Co.
saloon 1951

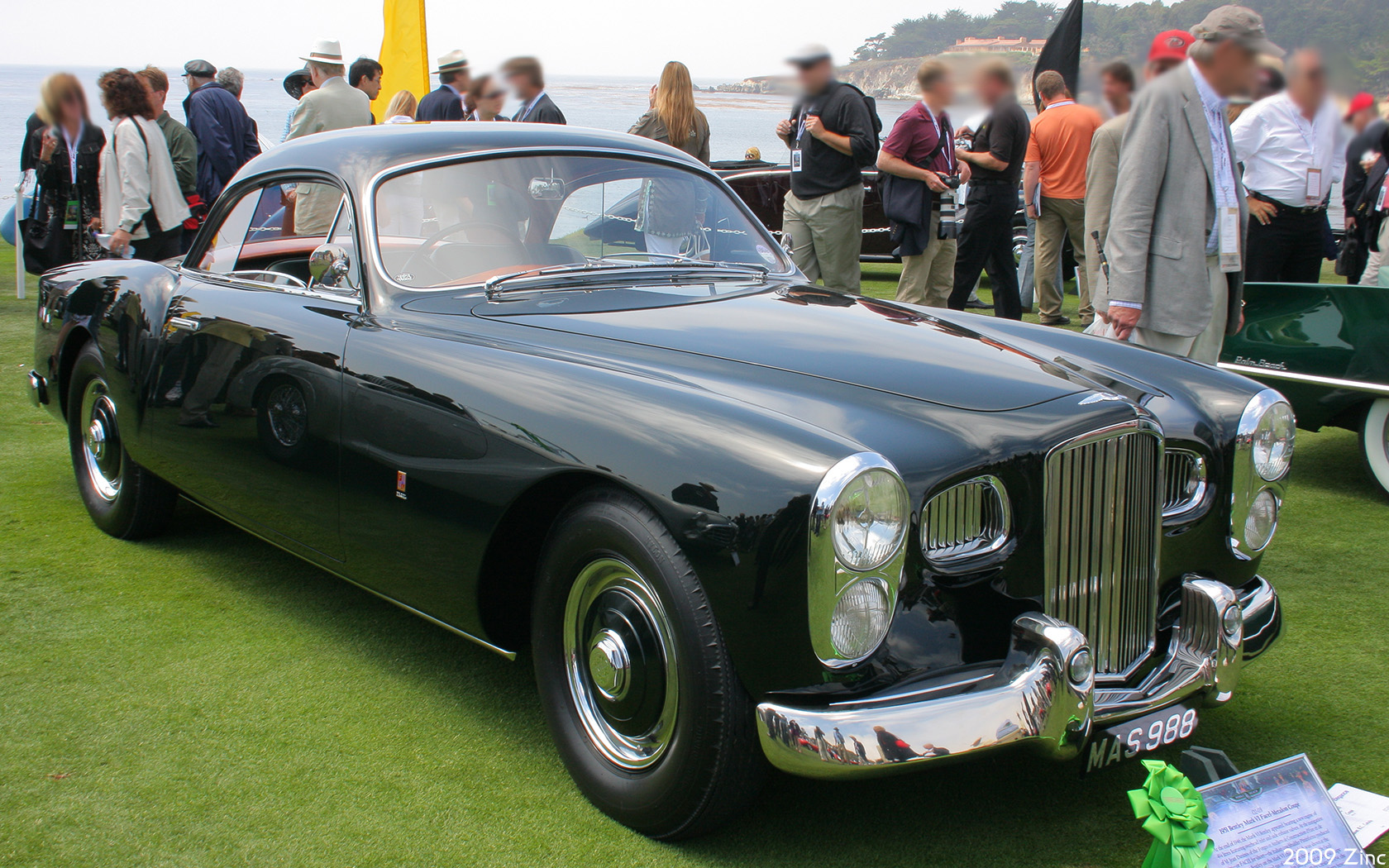
Facel-Métallon Cresta II
fixed head coupé 1951
by Battista Pininfarina

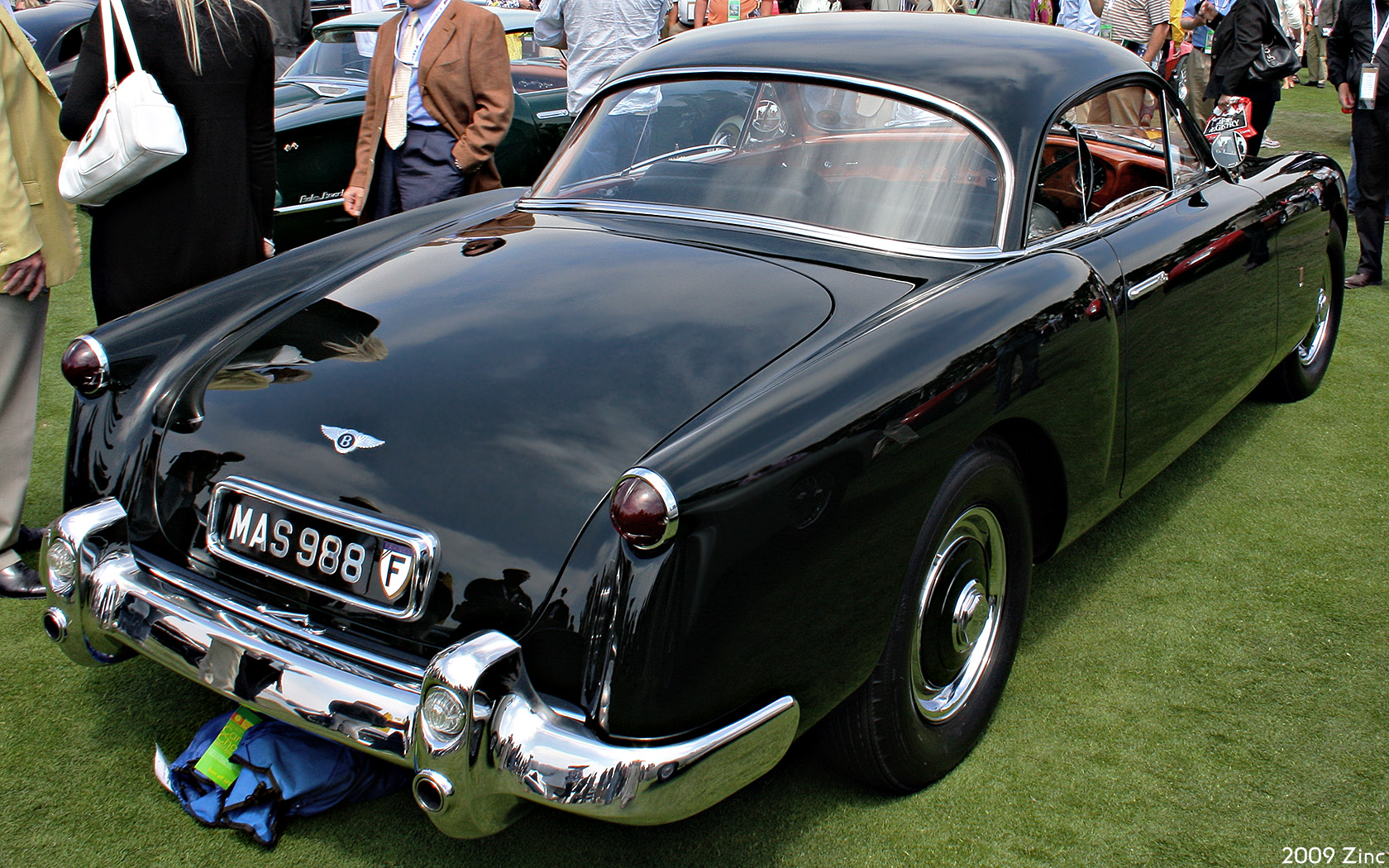
Cresta II rear view

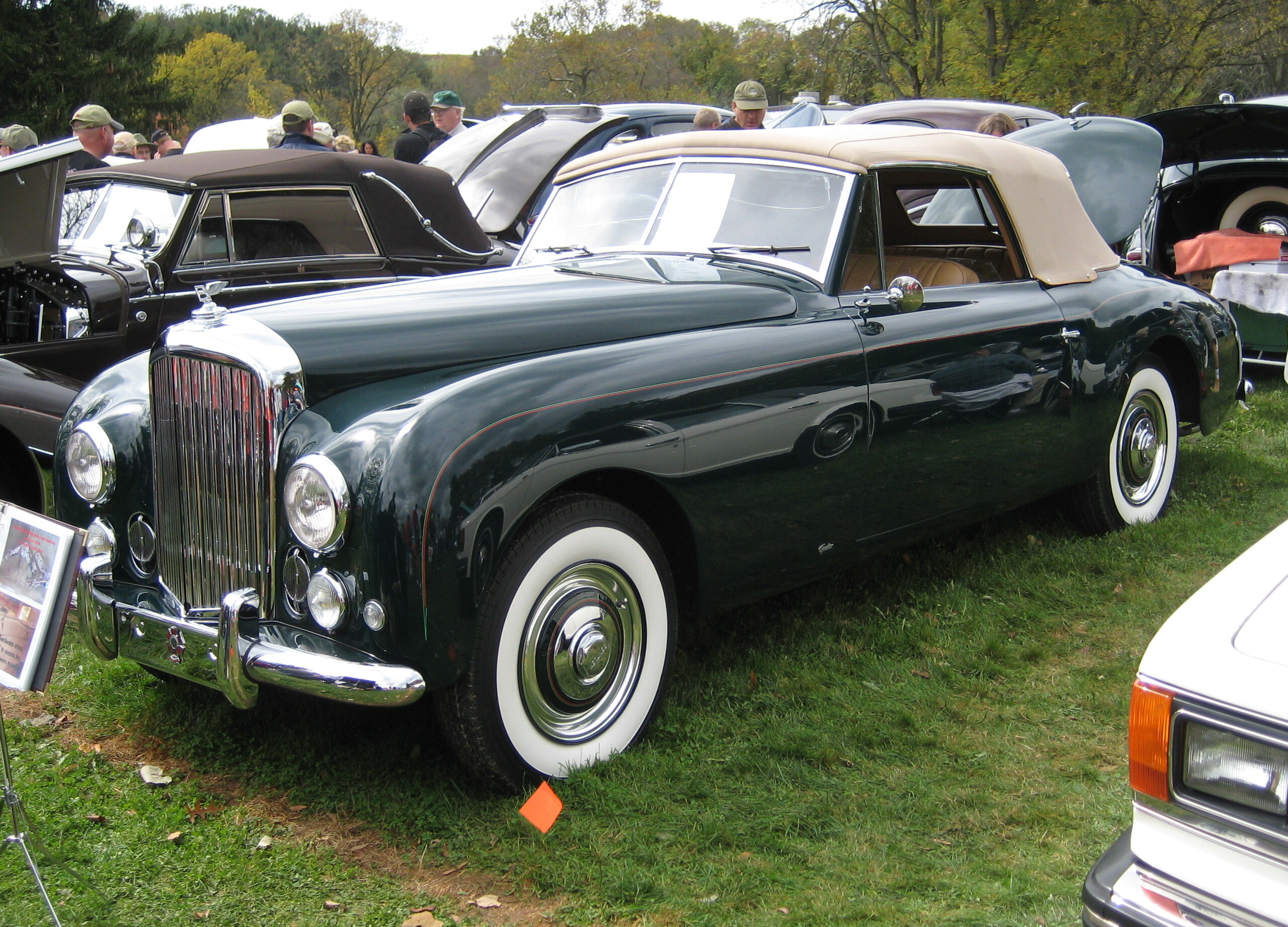
Graber Wichtrach drop-head coupé 1953

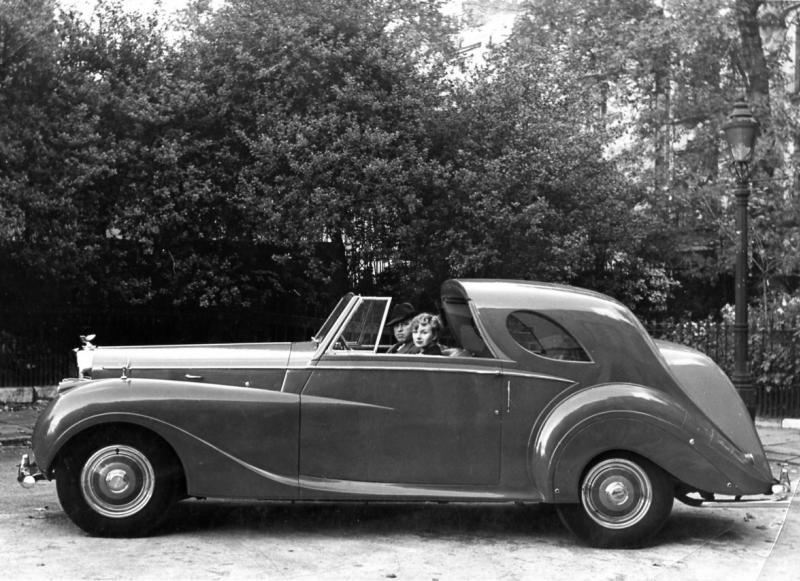
Gurney Nutting
coupé de ville

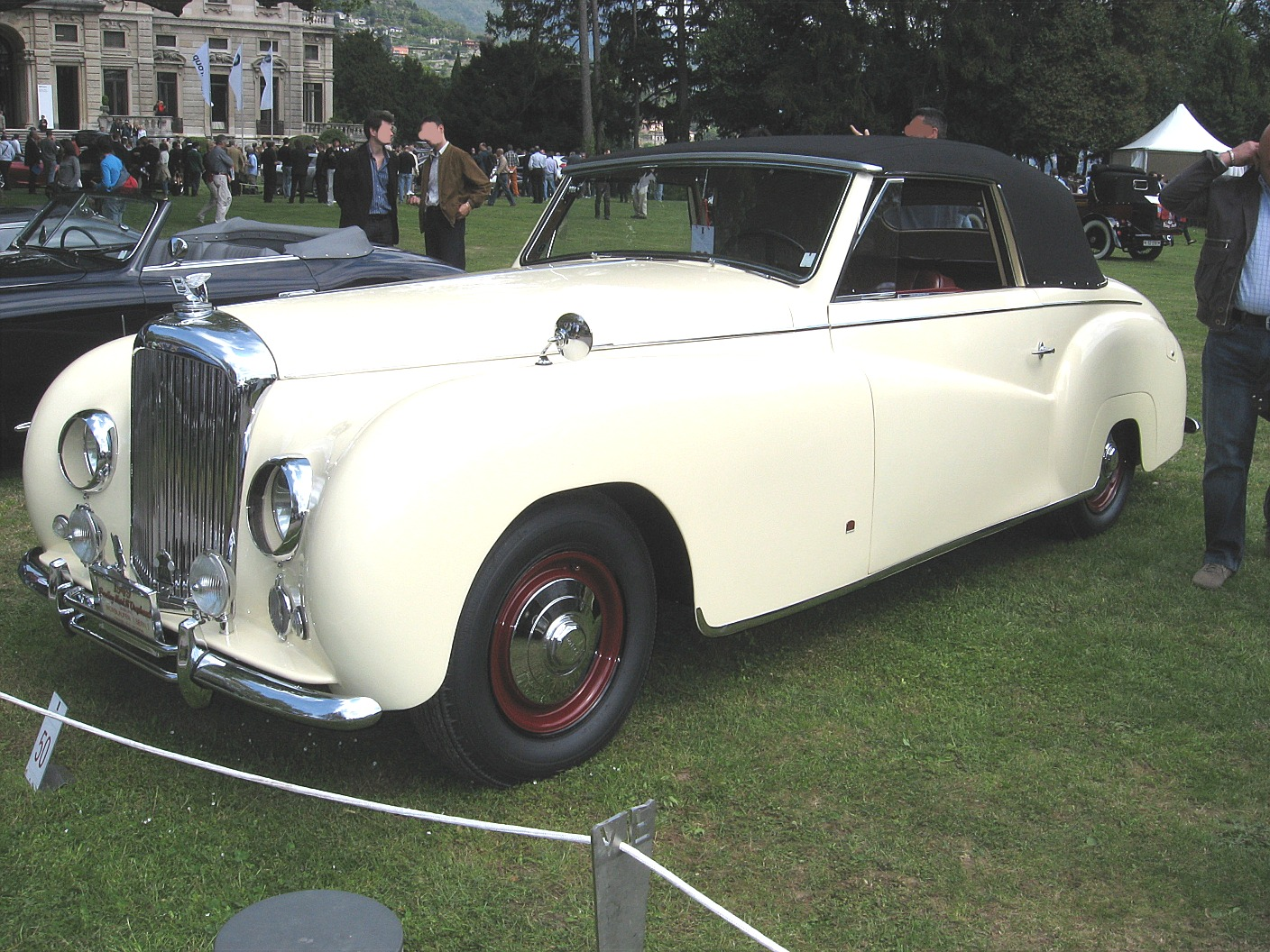
Carosserie Worblaufen Fritz Ramseier aka Ramseier Brothers
Drop-head coupé 1949

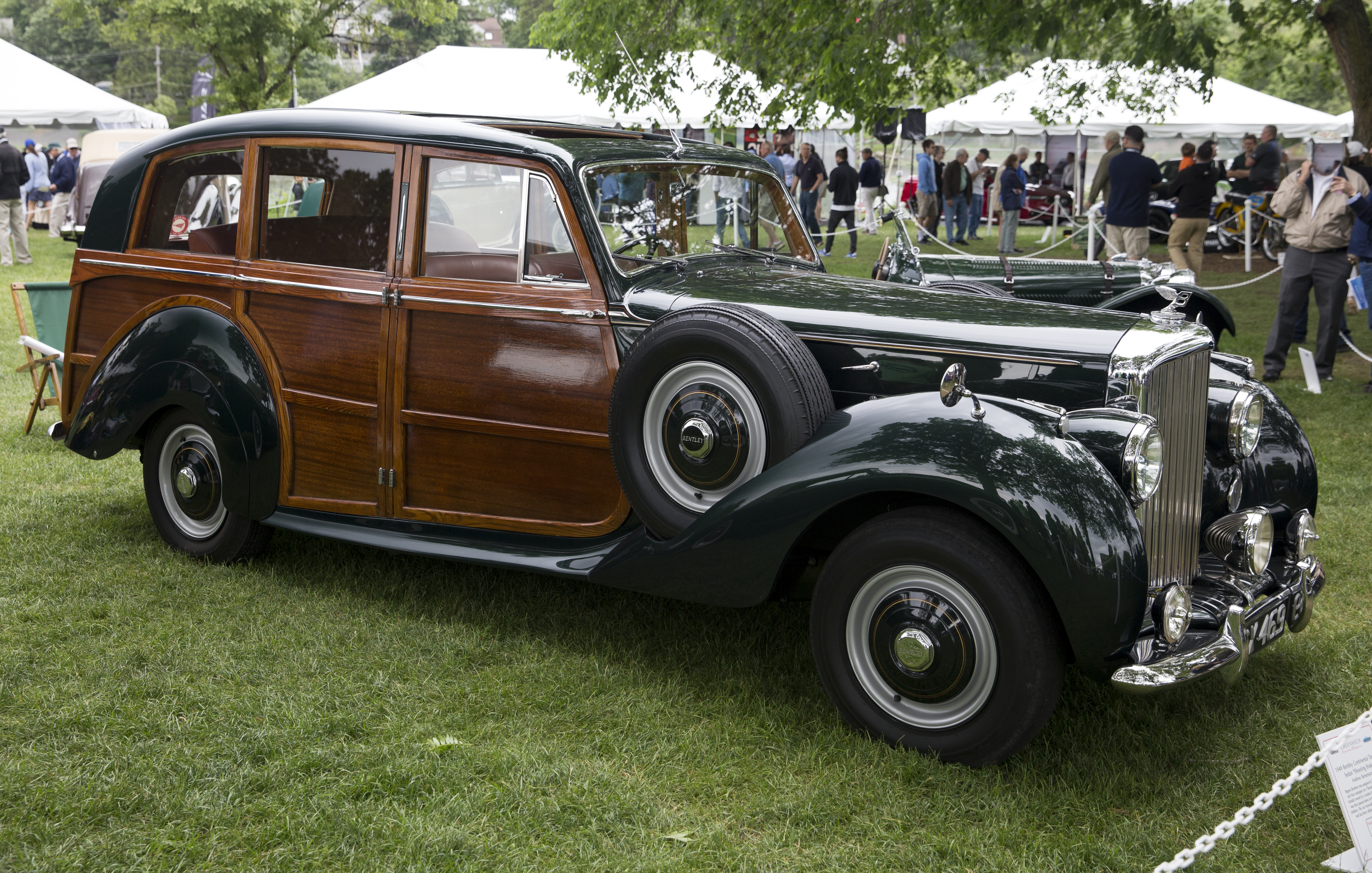
Rippon Bros shooting brake 1949
