= Bentley Continental =

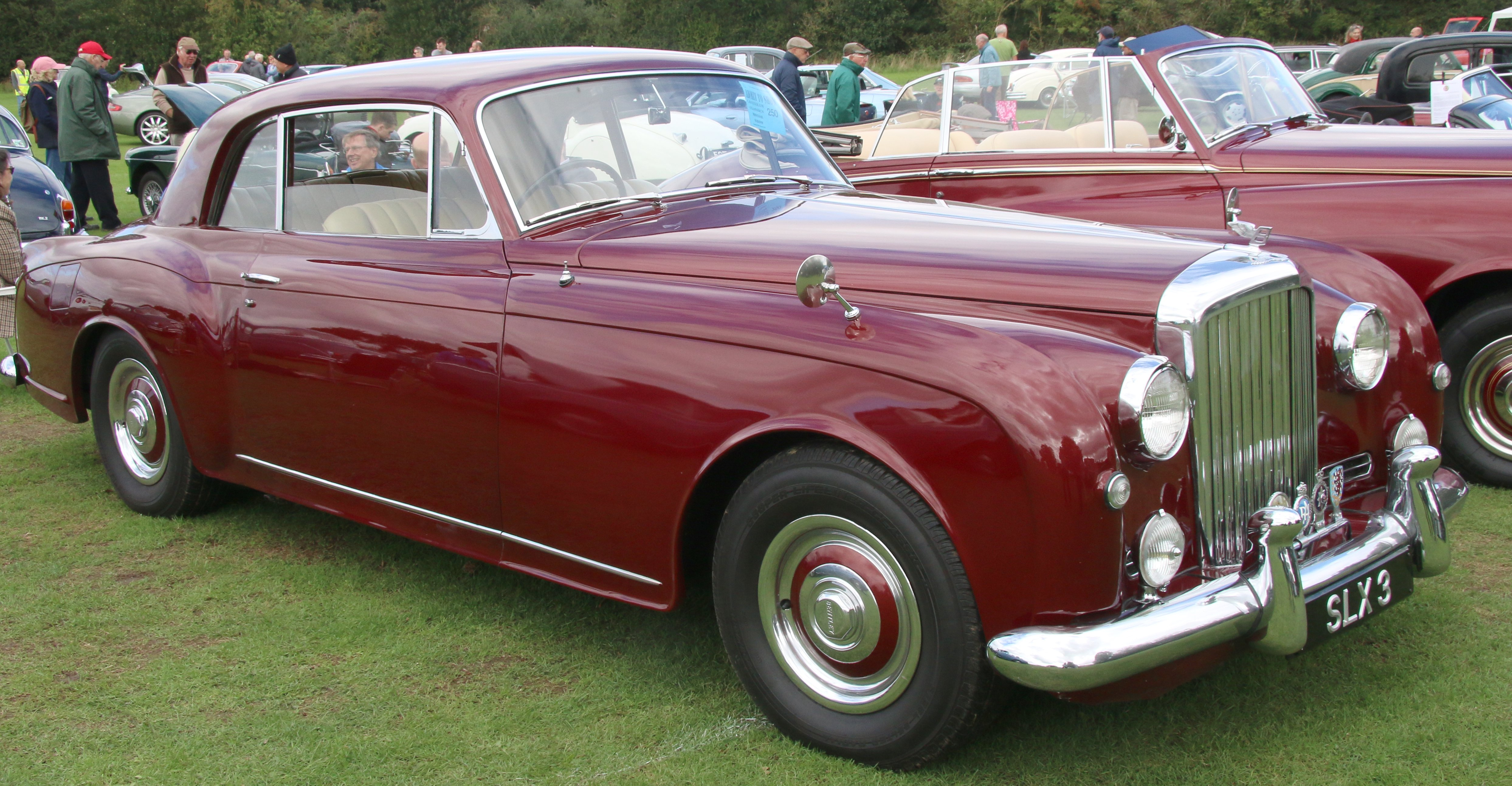
- 1956 Bentley S1 Continental by Park Ward

Overview
- Manufacturer: Bentley Motors
- Production: 1952–1965; 1984–2002; 2003–present

Body and chassis
- Body style: 2-door coupé; 2-door convertible; 4-door saloon (Flying Spur)
- Layout: FR layout

Bentley Continental refers to several models of cars produced by Bentley Motors. Originally, it referred to a special chassis for engines more powerful than the usual offering, supplied to a selected number of coachbuilders for the fitting of very light-weight coachwork designed under Rolls-Royce supervision.

The model name Continental had already been used by Rolls-Royce for models intended and geared for long-distance, high-speed touring on roads and of a style then only available in continental Europe. 1930s to 1950s advertising for even the Standard Steel Bentley saloons carried the slogan the Silent Sports Car. The Continental model was a lighter, faster, more nimble high-performance version, for high-speed travel in great comfort.

The Continental name has since been re-used by Bentley for unrelated automobiles from 1984 onward.

== 1952 to 1965 ==
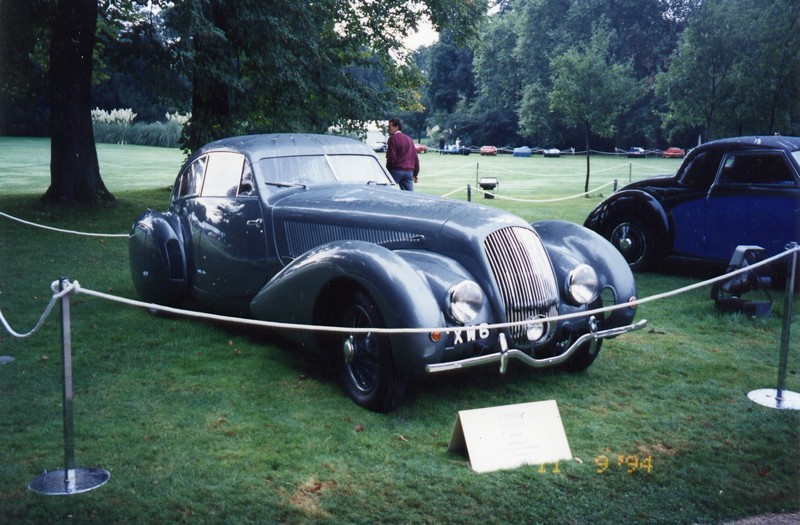
1938 'Embiricos' Bentley by Pourtout of Paris, a prototype Bentley Continental

Following the break brought about by the Second World War, Bentley resumed production of civilian automobiles, relocating its plant from Derby to Crewe. There, Bentley engineers produced R-Type Continentals for three years, from June 1952 to April 1955. These cars were derivatives of the Standard Steel R-Type, the second series in Bentley's postwar luxury lineup.

The R-Type Continental's chassis was specially built incorporating special components, including a high-performance engine, and fitted with very special light-weight bodies designed and built under the close supervision of Rolls-Royce. One of the world's most expensive automobiles, only about 208 R-Type Continentals were built in total. In 2015, a 1952 R-Type Continental, in unrestored condition, sold for over US$1 million.

After the R-Type Continental, the Continental S1 (1955–1959), S2 (1959–1962), and S3 (1962–1965) were delivered, beginning in March 1955. The first S1 was well received, and 49 were built. The S2 was delivered from July 1959, and it debuted with a new L Series V-8 engine.. It also incorporated previously optional amenities, such as air conditioning and power steering. The S3, delivered from September 1962, was distinguishable principally by having four headlamps instead of two in the front wings. This series of the Continental ended with deliveries in November 1965, after the September 1965 introduction of the unitary construction T-series.

=== Production timeline ===
Grand Touring cars:

- 1952–1955 Bentley R-Type Continental
- 1955–1959 Bentley S1 Continental
- 1959–1962 Bentley S2 Continental
- 1962–1965 Bentley S3 Continental

Production closed with the introduction of the unitary construction Bentley T-series.

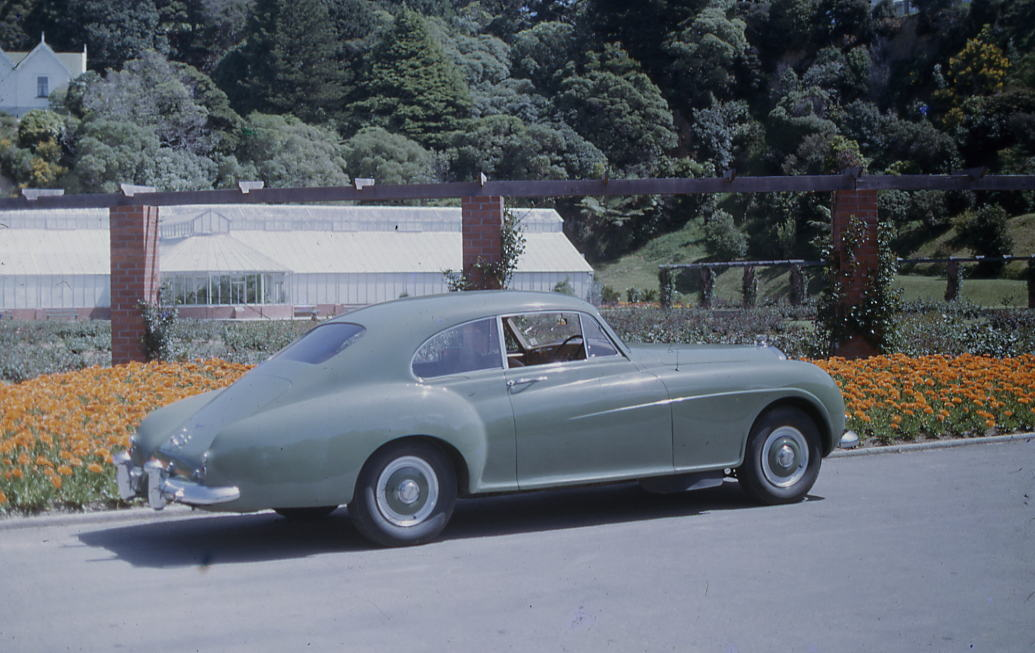
1953 R-Type by H. J. Mulliner & Co.

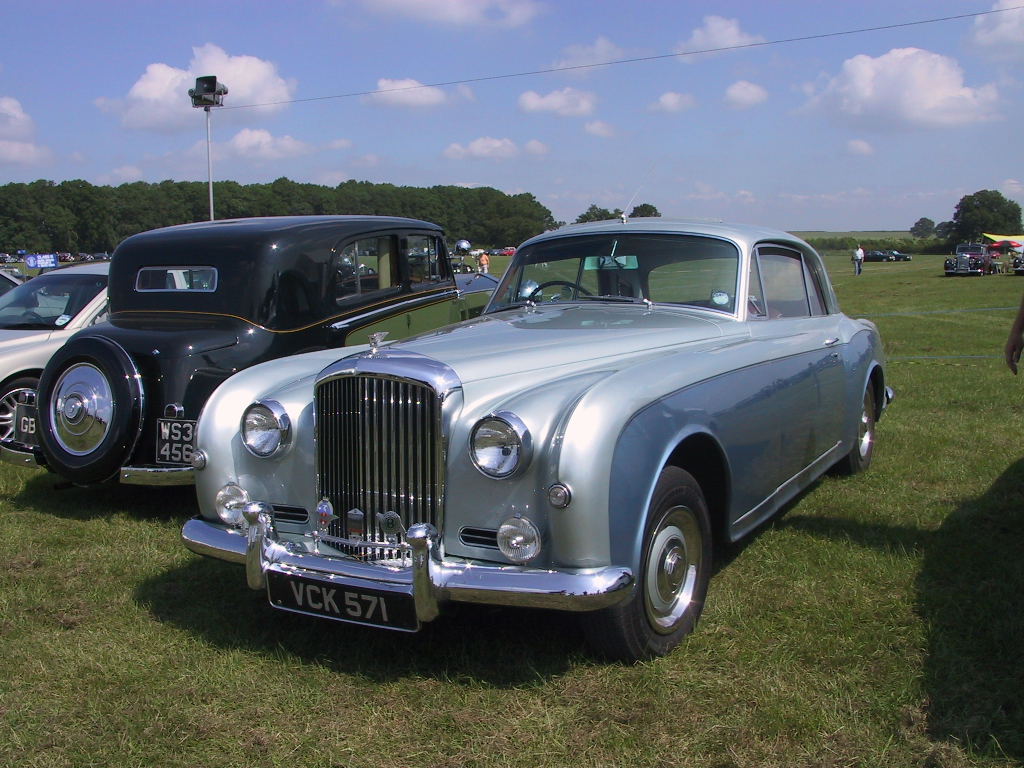
1957 S1 by Park Ward

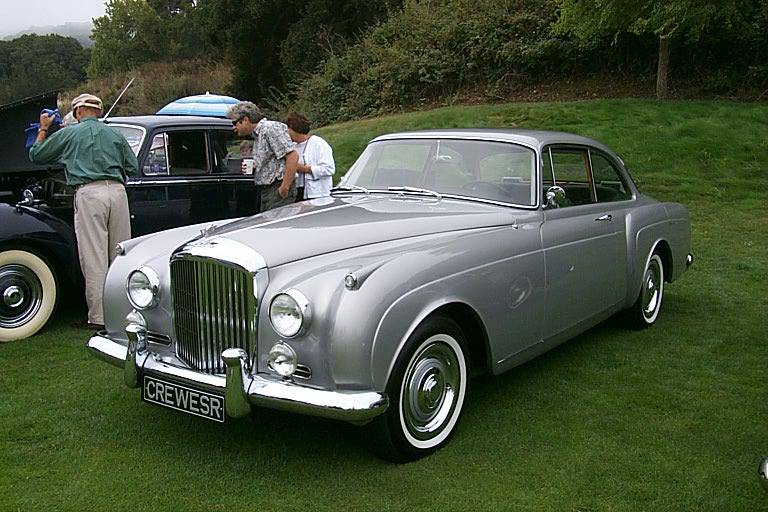
Bentley Continental S2

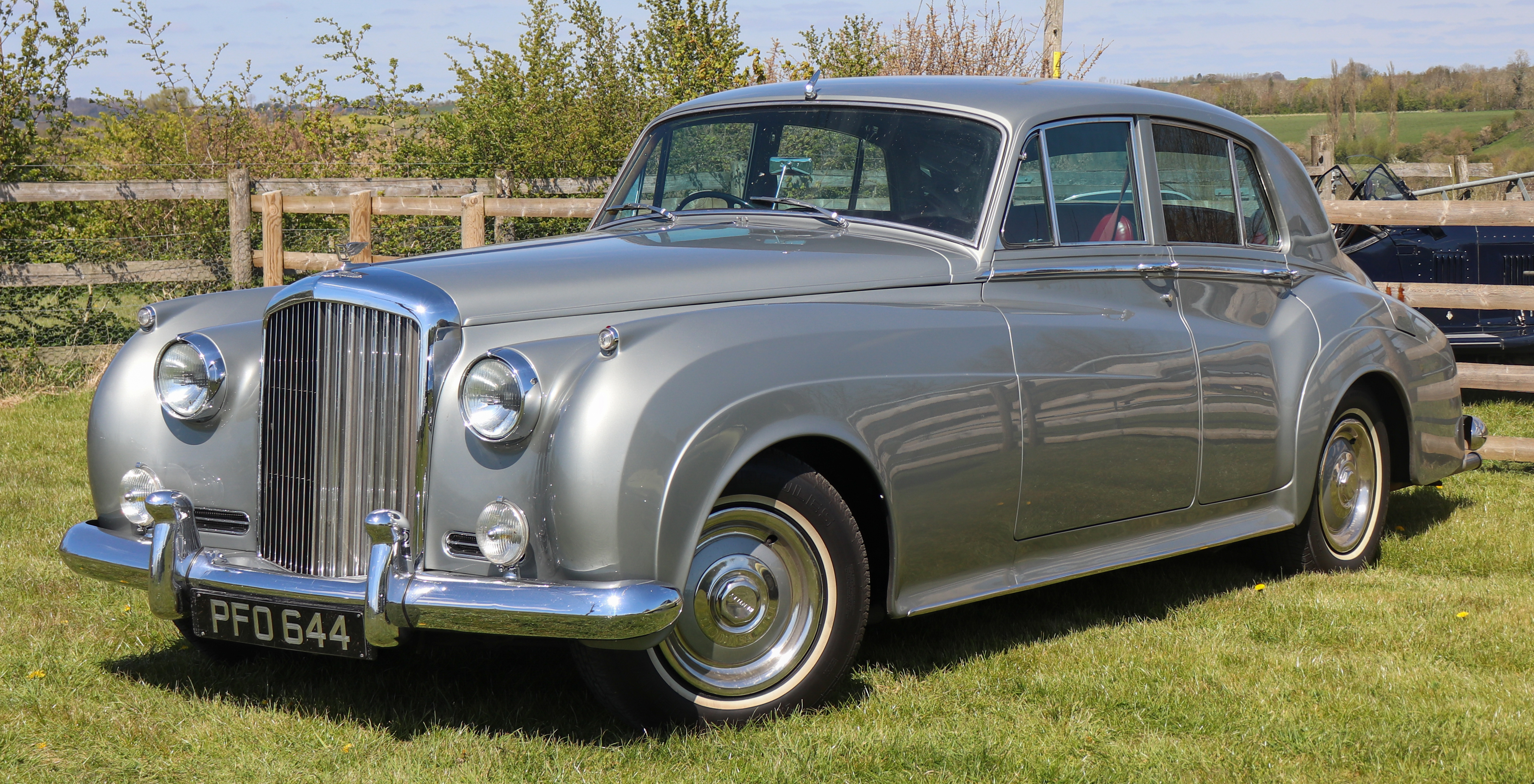
1961 Bentley S2 Standard saloon

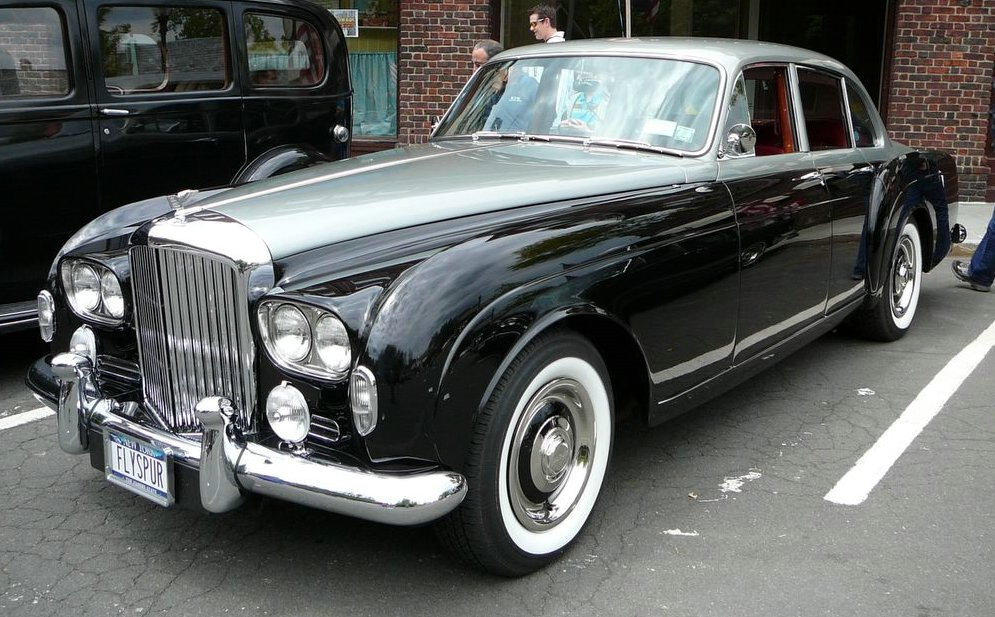
1962 S3 saloon, Mulliner's Flying Spur

== 1984 to 2002 ==
The Continental nameplate was revived in 1984. The following cars with non-standard and distinctive bodywork were produced until 2002:

- 1984–1995 Bentley Continental
- 1991–2002 Bentley Continental R
- 1994–1995 Bentley Continental S
- 1996–2002 Bentley Continental T
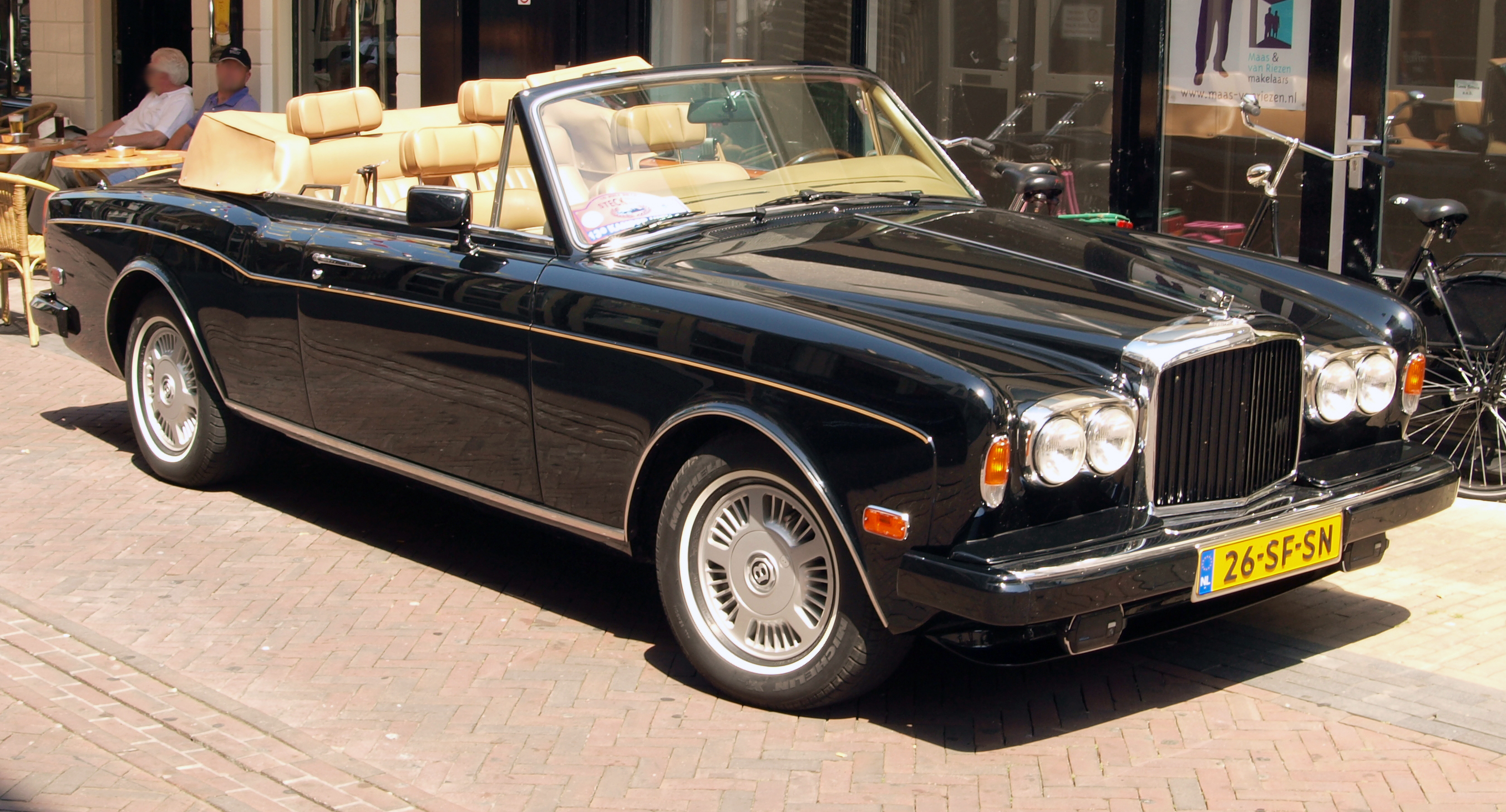
1988 Continental

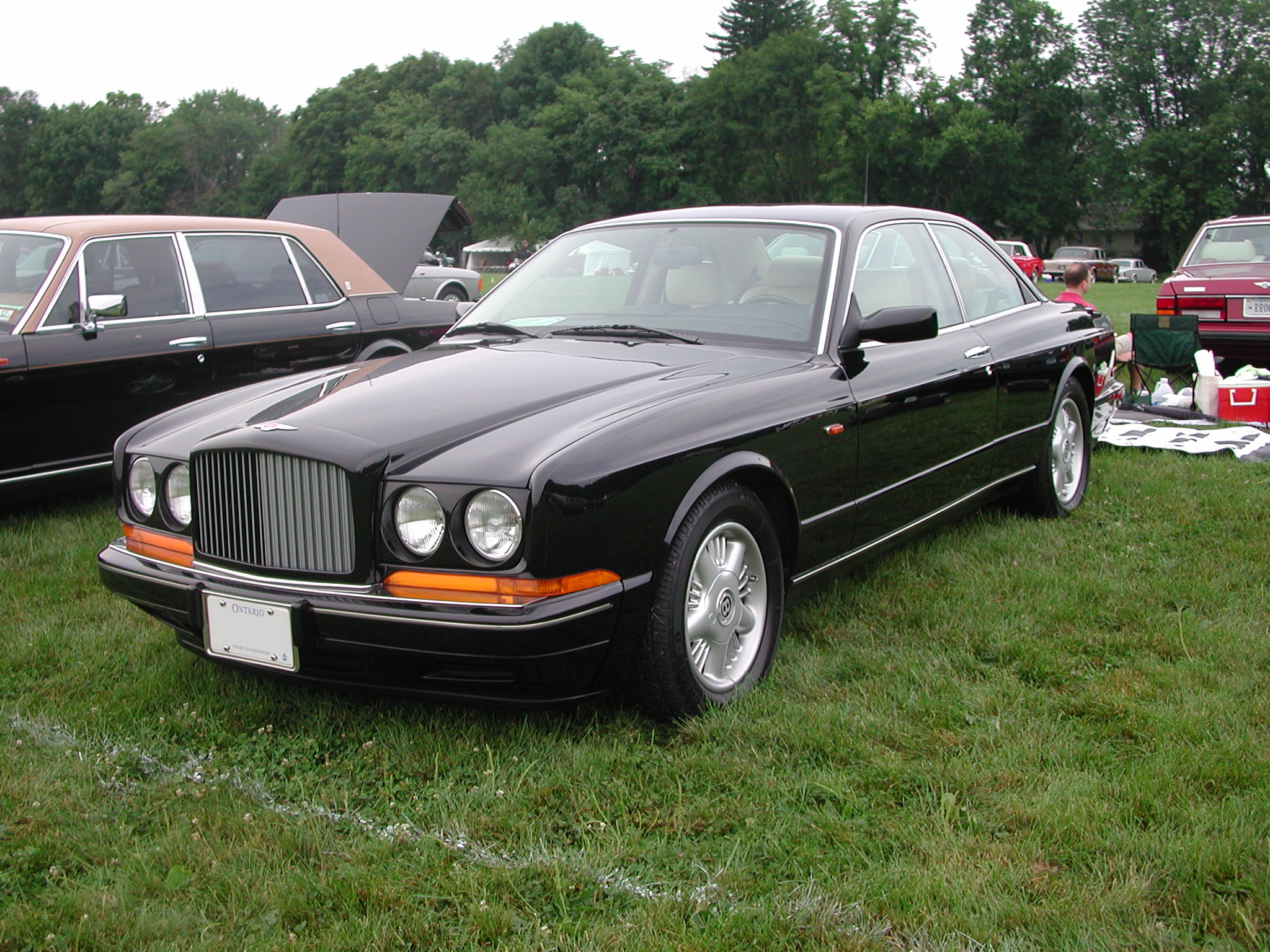
1998 Continental R

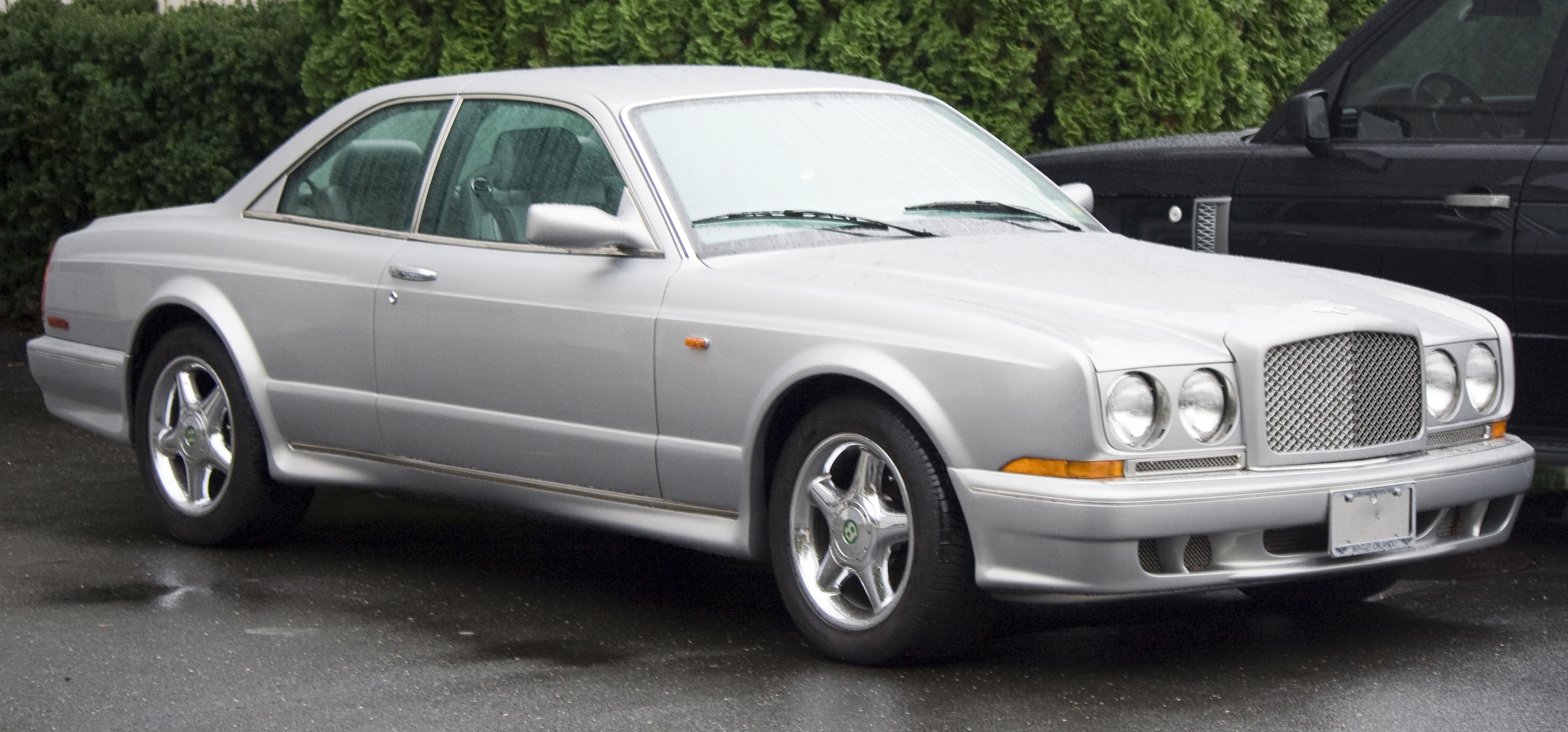
2000 Continental R

== 2003 to present ==
Bentley Continental
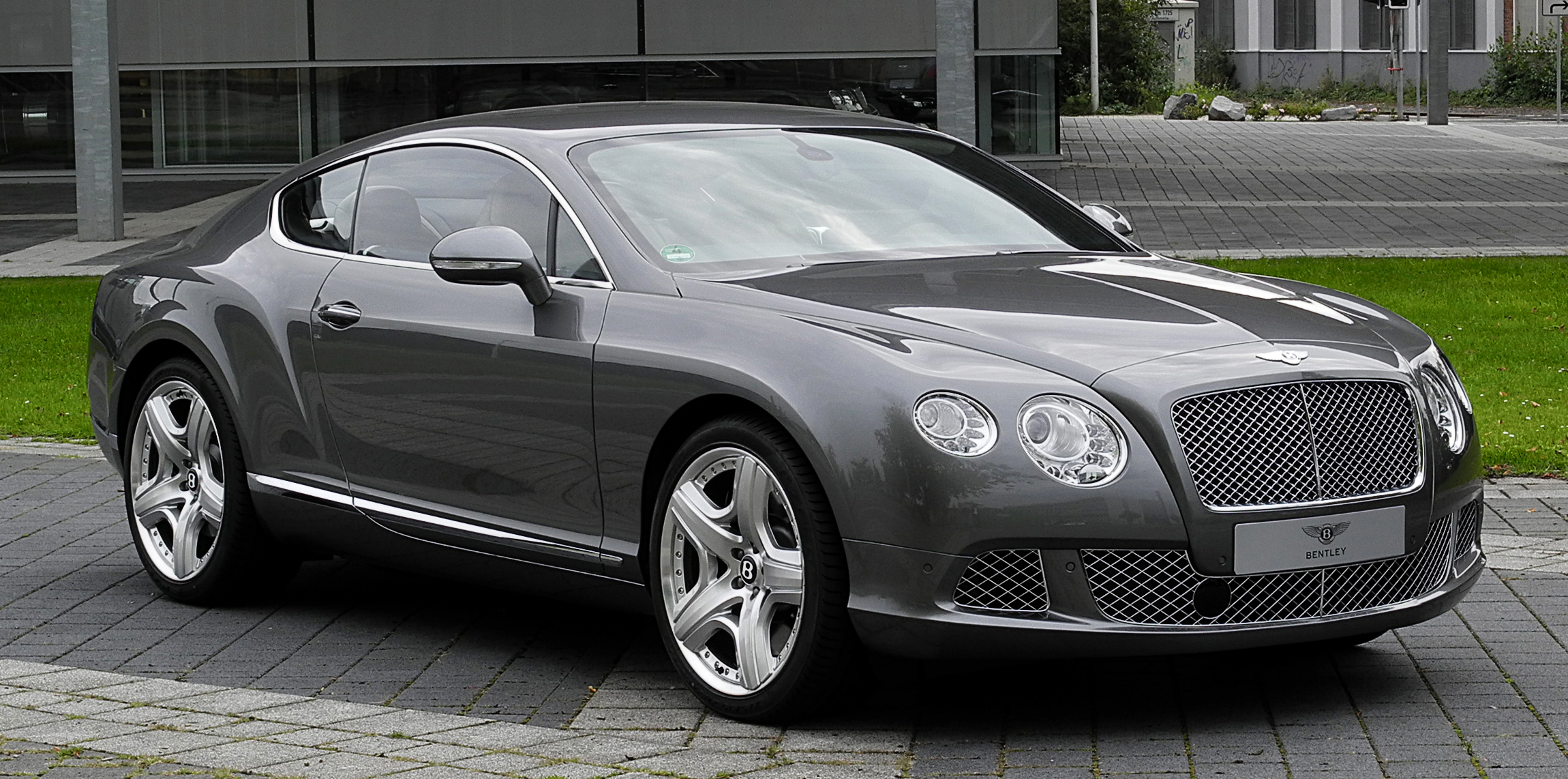
- 2013 Bentley Continental GT (II)

Overview
- Manufacturer: Bentley Motors
- Production: 2003–present

Body and chassis
- Body style: 2-door coupé 2-door convertible
- Layout: FR layout

Three versions of the Continental have been sold following Vickers' sale of Bentley to Volkswagen:

- 2003–present Bentley Continental GT
- 2006–present Bentley Continental GTC
- 2005–2013 Bentley Continental Flying Spur

The next-generation Bentley Continental is scheduled for 2018, and it will include a plug-in hybrid variant. Bentley will borrow the plug-in hybrid powertrain from the Porsche Cayenne S E-Hybrid.

Components for Bentley Continental will be sourced from Volkswagen's plants in Germany and Slovakia, with stampings from Volkswagen's factory in Bratislava. Porsche's plant in Leipzig will be responsible for assembling bodies-in-white, alongside Porsche's Panamera. Bentley's factory in Crewe will carry out final assembly.

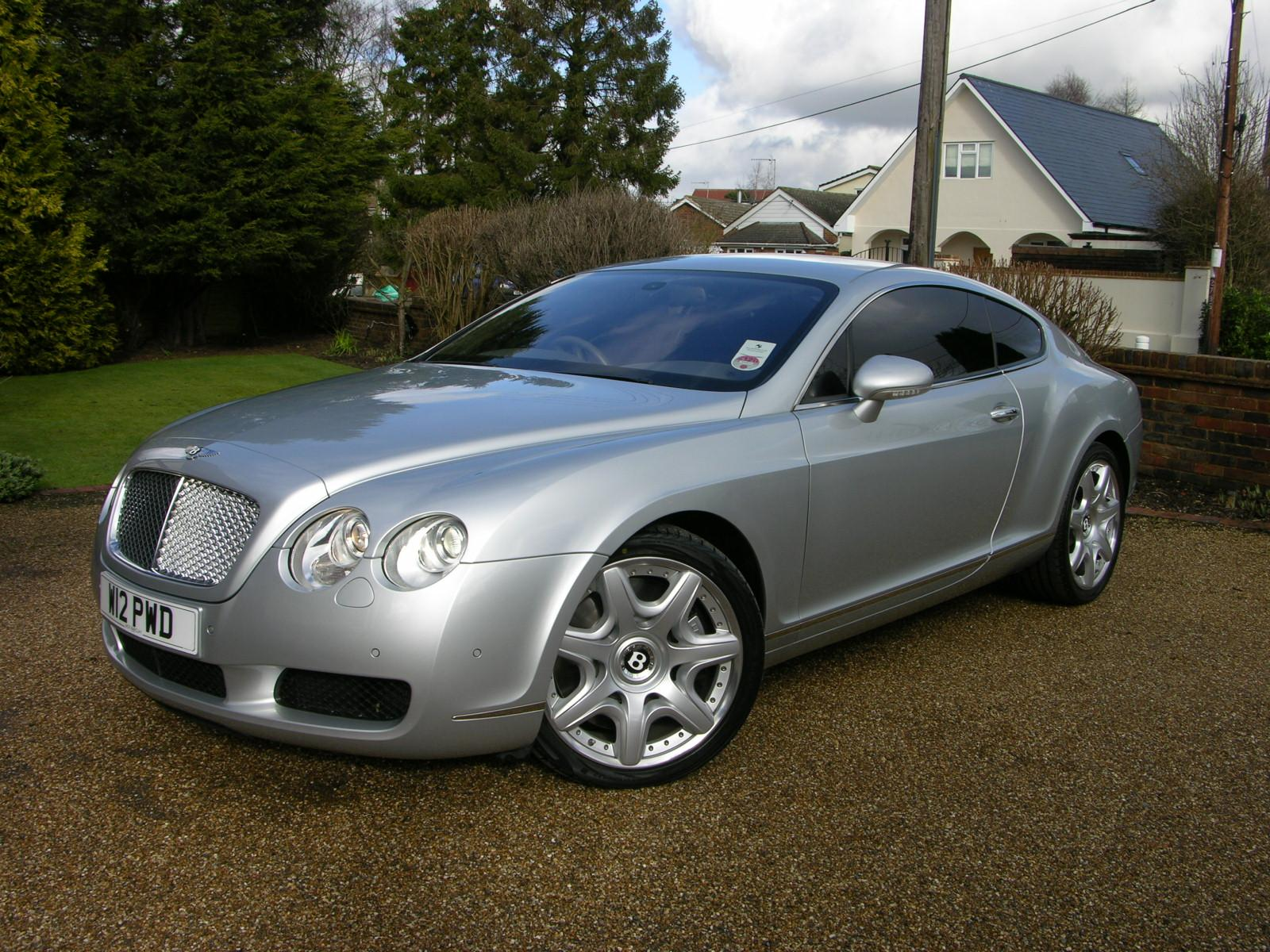
2005 GT
