= Rolls-Royce Corniche =

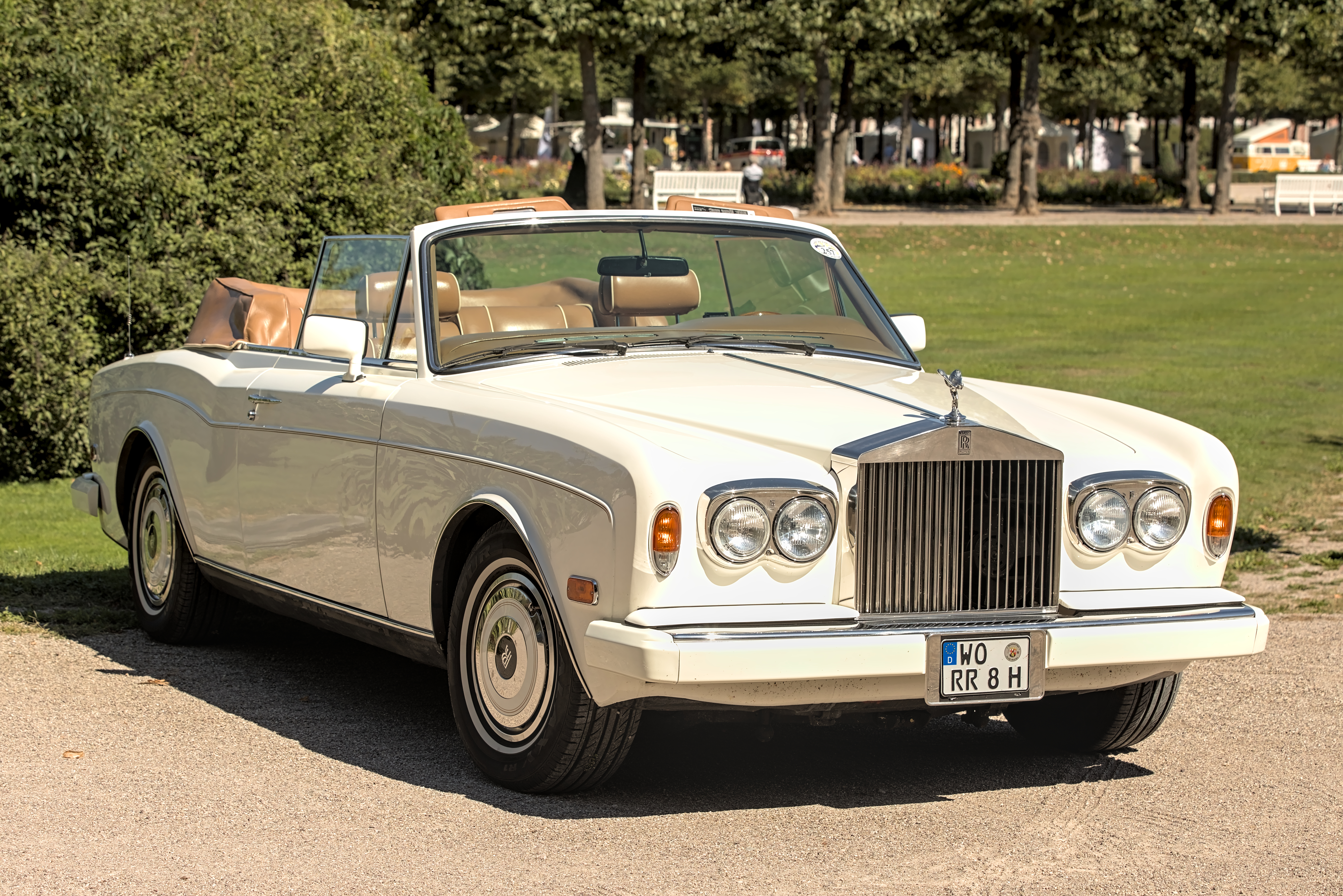
- Rolls-Royce Corniche II

Overview
- Manufacturer: Rolls-Royce Ltd (1971–1973); Rolls-Royce Motors (1973–1995)
- Production: 1971–1995 (6,823 produced); Rolls-Royce: 6,262 produced; Bentley: 561 produced
- Designer: Bill Allen

Body and chassis
- Body style: 2-door coupé (1971–1980); 2-door convertible
- Layout: FR layout

Powertrain
- Engine: 6.75 L L410 OHV V8

Chronology
- Predecessor: Silver Shadow two-door
- Successor: Corniche V; Bentley Azure (Bentley Continental)

The Rolls-Royce Corniche is a two-door, front-engine, rear wheel drive luxury car produced by Rolls-Royce Motors as a hardtop coupé (from 1971 to 1980) and as a convertible (from 1971 to 1995 and 1999 to 2002).

The Corniche was a development of the Mulliner Park Ward two-door versions of the Rolls-Royce Silver Shadow. These were designated the 2-door Saloon and Drophead Coupé, and were introduced in 1965 and 1966 respectively. Production remained in London at Mulliner Park Ward; the new name was applied in March 1971.

A Bentley version of the Corniche was also produced. It became known as the Bentley Continental from 1984 to 1995.

The Corniche draws its name from the experimental 1939 Corniche prototype. The name originally comes from the French word corniche, a coastal road, especially along the face of a cliff, most notably the Grande Corniche along the French Riviera above the principality of Monaco.

No other car conveyed an image of the idle rich better than the Corniche for its entire 30 year run of production.

== 1939 experimental Corniche ==
1939 Bentley Corniche prototype recreation
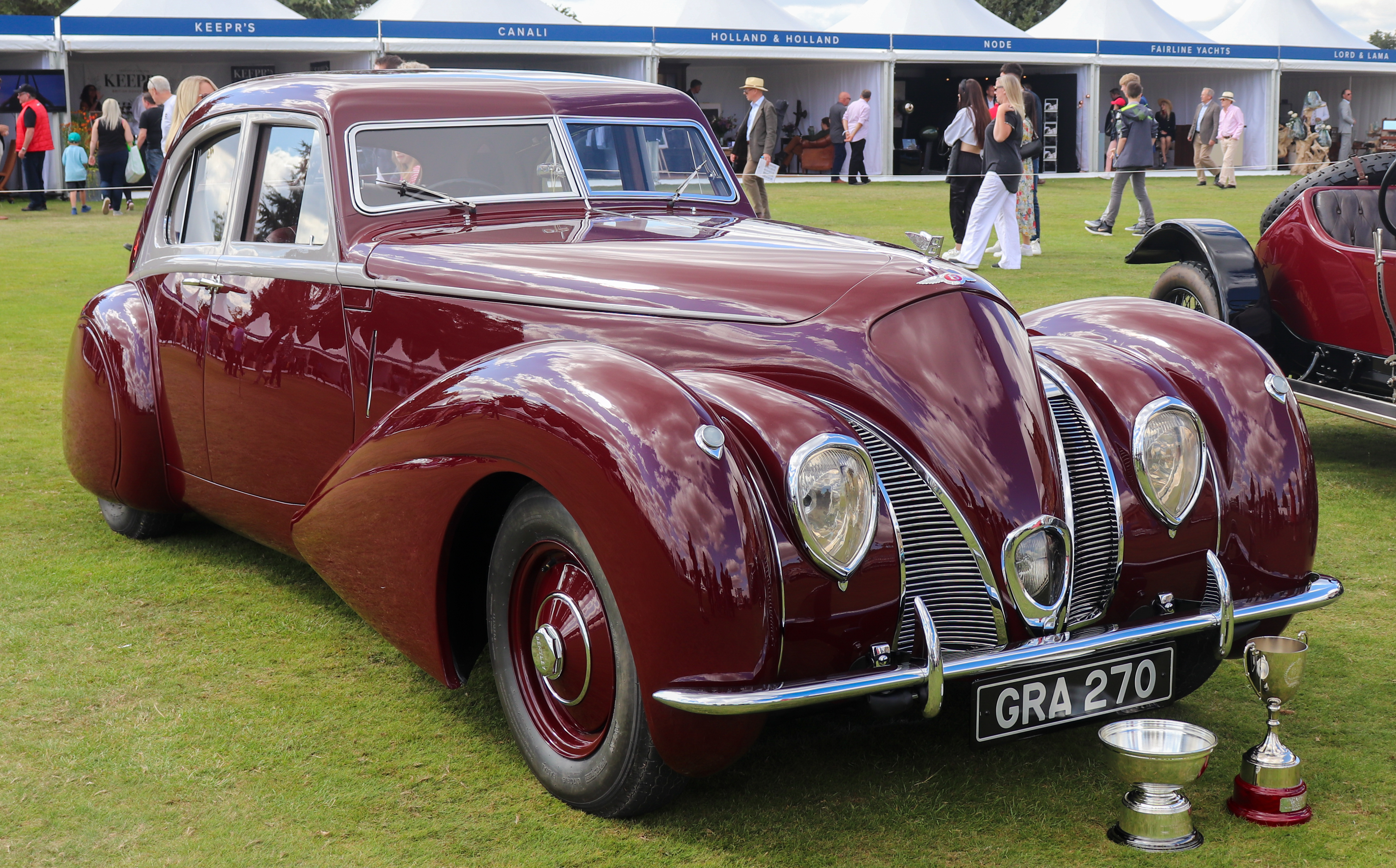
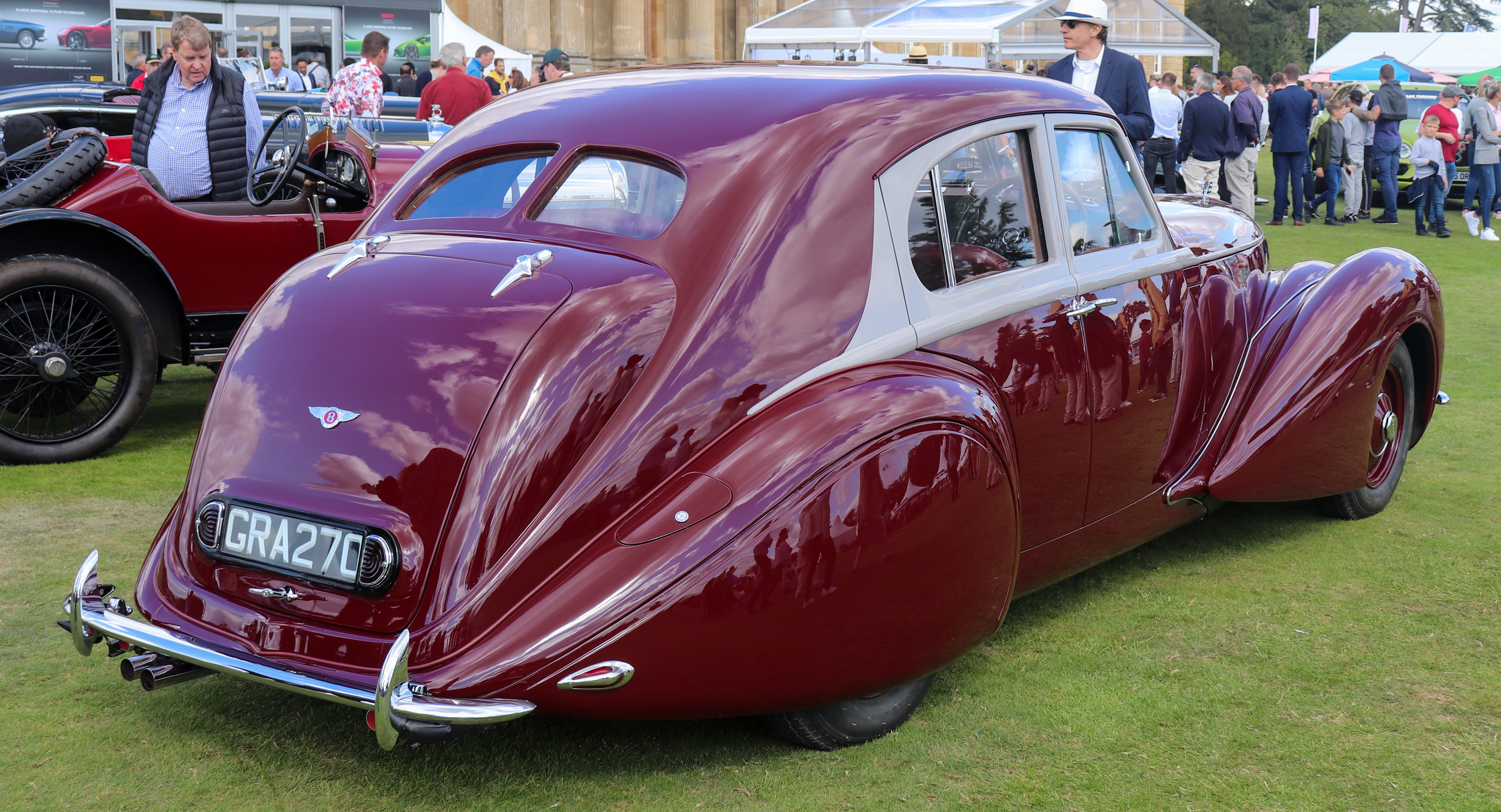

The first car bearing the Corniche nameplate was a 1939 prototype based on the Bentley Mark V, featuring coachwork designed in collaboration with several third parties, most prominent of which was acclaimed French designer Georges Paulin. It was built by Parisian firm Carrosserie Vanvooren.

It underwent 15,000 miles (24,000 km) of endurance testing in Continental Europe before being destroyed by a bomb at a dock in Dieppe while awaiting shipment back to England. No production model was ever manufactured because of the onset of World War II, but the company registered the name for future use. The unique car was fully re-created by Bentley's Mulliner division to join the company's heritage fleet; construction of the recreation was completed in 2019.

== Corniche I (1971–1987) ==
Corniche I
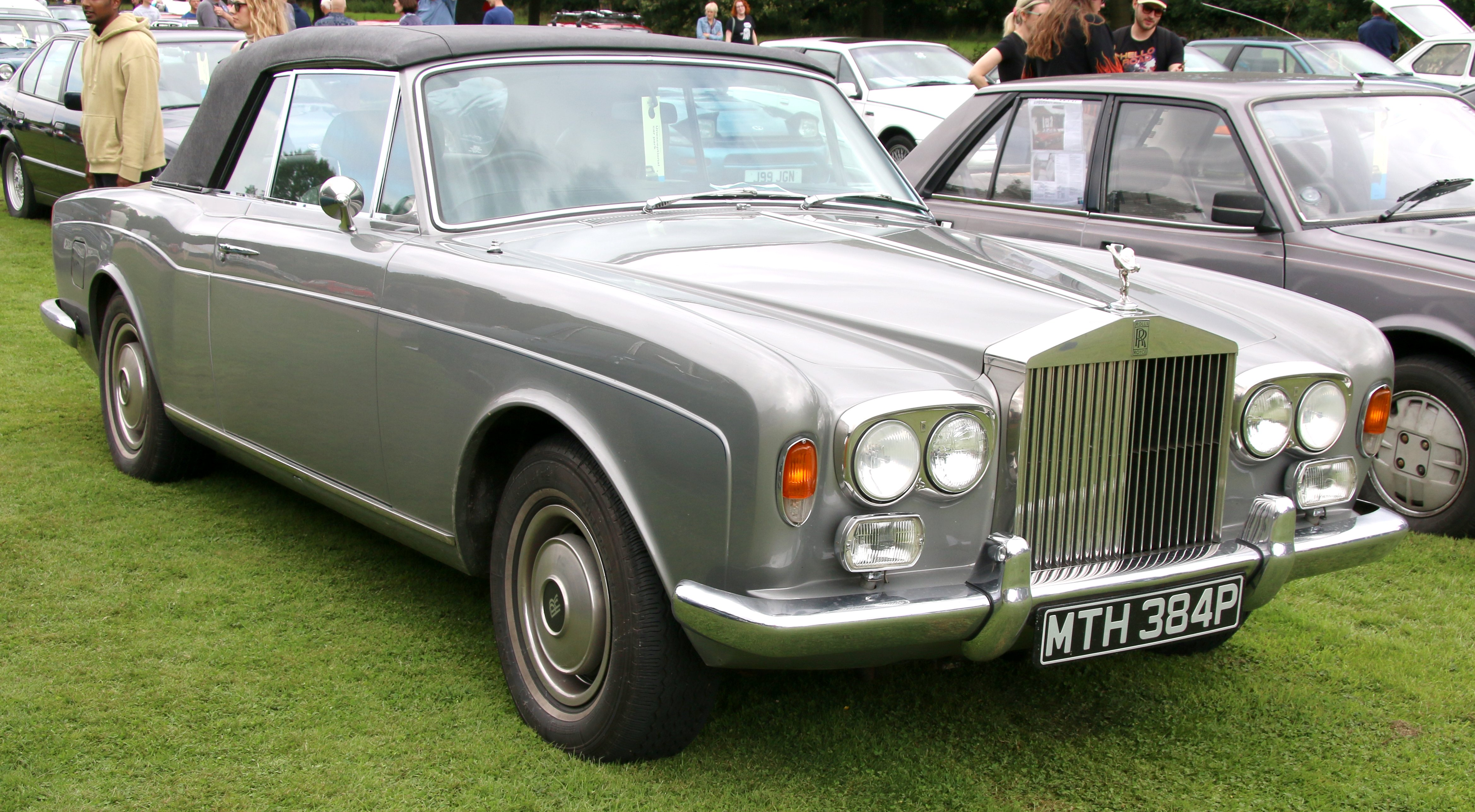
- Rolls-Royce Corniche convertible

Overview
- Production: 1971–1987
- Assembly: United Kingdom: London, England

Body and chassis
- Body style: 2-door coupé; 2-door convertible
- Related: Bentley T-series; Rolls-Royce Silver Shadow; Rolls-Royce Camargue

Powertrain
- Engine: 6.75 L L410 OHV V8
- Transmission: 3-speed automatic

Dimensions
- Wheelbase: 1971–1973: 119.75 in (3,042 mm); 1974–1979: 120 in (3,048 mm); 1979–1987: 120.5 in (3,061 mm)
- Length: 203.5 in (5,169 mm)
- Width: 72 in (1,829 mm)
- Height: 58.75 in (1,492 mm)
- Kerb weight: 4,816 lb (2,185 kg)

The Corniche, available as either a coupé or convertible, used the standard Rolls-Royce V8 engine with an aluminium-silicon alloy block and aluminium cylinder heads with cast iron wet cylinder liners. The bore was 4.1 in (104.1 mm) and the stroke was 3.9 in (99.1 mm), with a displacement of 6.75 L (6,750 cc/411 cuin). Twin SU carburettors were initially fitted, but were replaced with a single Solex 4A1 four-barrel carburetor introduced in 1977. De-smogged export models retained the twin SUs until 1980, when Bosch fuel injection was added.

A three-speed automatic transmission (a Turbo Hydramatic 400 sourced from General Motors) was standard. A four-wheel independent suspension with coil springs was augmented with a hydraulic self-levelling system (using the same system as did Citroën, but without pneumatic springs, and with the hydraulic components built under licence by Rolls-Royce), at first on all four, but later on the rear wheels only. Four wheel disc brakes were specified, with ventilated discs added for 1972.

The car originally had a wheelbase of 119.75 in (3,042 mm). It was extended to 120 in (3,048 mm) in 1974 and 120.5 in (3,061 mm) in 1979. The Corniche was different from other Silver Shadows in that it had exclusive half wheel covers with stainless steel trim (for brake cooling), a 3-spoke steering wheel with a wood rim, and Rolls Royce's first standard tachometer.

The Corniche immediately became a status symbol for celebrities upon its release. Paul McCartney, Frank Sinatra and Tom Jones all bought one. David Bowie, Michael Caine, Elton John and Dean Martin put their names on two-year-long waiting lists. It has been seen in countless films and television shows from Beverly Hills, 90210 to Dynasty, and Dirty Rotten Scoundrels to The Player.

The Corniche received a mild restyling in the spring of 1977. Mechanical differences included rack-and-pinion steering, alloy and rubber bumpers, an aluminium radiator, an oil cooler, and a bi-level air conditioning system. Later changes included a modified rear independent suspension in March 1979. In March 1981, after the Silver Spirit had gone on sale, the fixed-roof version of the Corniche and its Bentley sister were discontinued. For 1985 there were also cosmetic and interior changes.

Corniche models received Bosch KE/K-Jetronic fuel injection in 1977. This engine, called the L410I, produced approximately 240 PS (177 kW; 237 hp) at just above 4,000 rpm for a top speed of 190 km/h (118 mph).

The Bentley version was updated in July 1984 with a new name, the Continental. It received revised and color-coded bumpers, rear view mirrors, a new dash, and improvements to the seats.

Production totaled 1,090 Rolls-Royce Corniche Saloons, 3,239 Rolls-Royce Corniche Convertibles, 69 Bentley Corniche Saloons and 77 Bentley Corniche Convertibles.

While the classic styling of the Corniche remains a symbol of wealth, Jeremy Clarkson mocked James May's Corniche as "just a Ford Zephyr with a chrome nose" during a 2009 Top Gear competition between his Mercedes 600 Grosser and May's 1972 Corniche I.

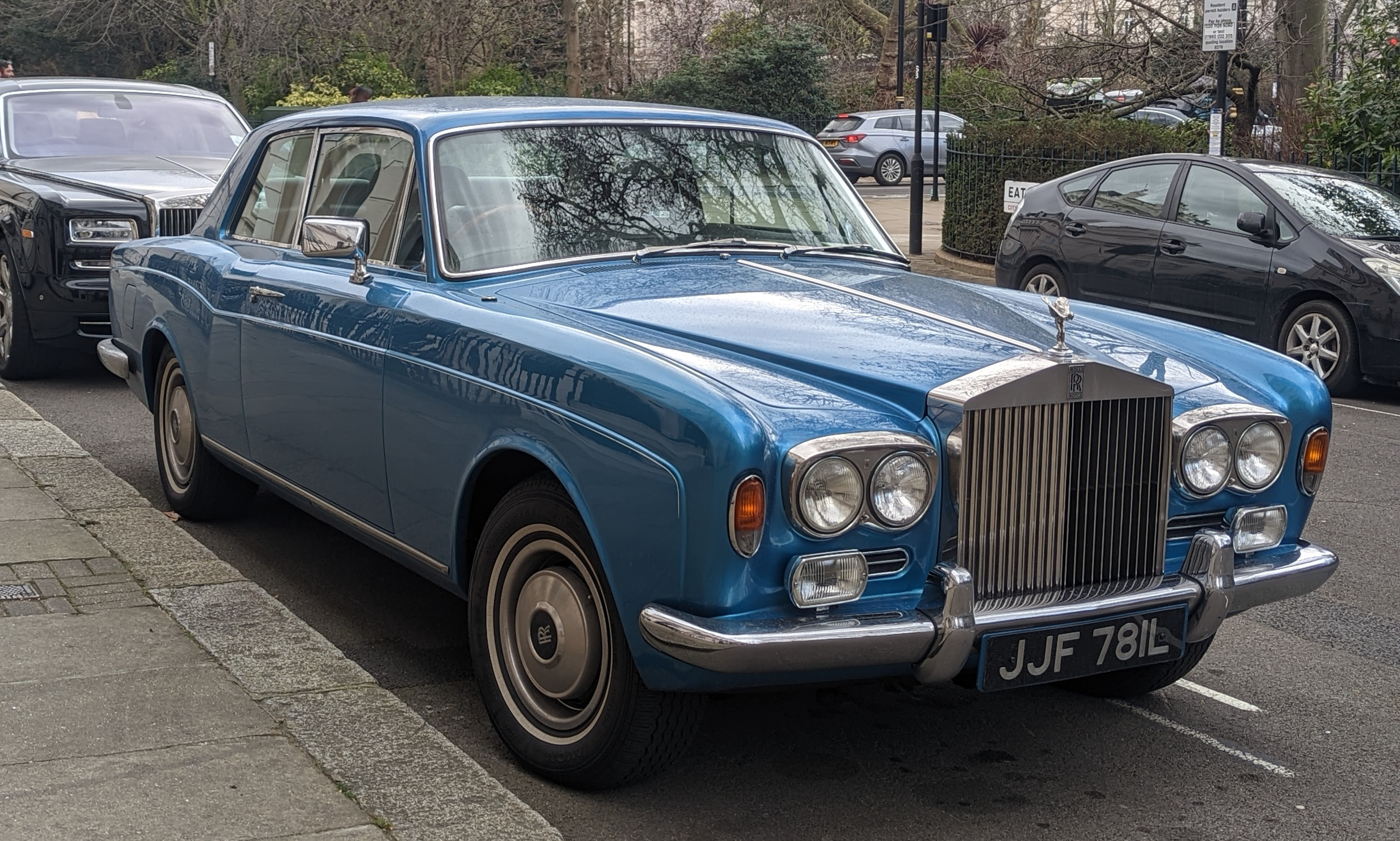
1971–1973 Rolls-Royce Corniche coupé (Europe)

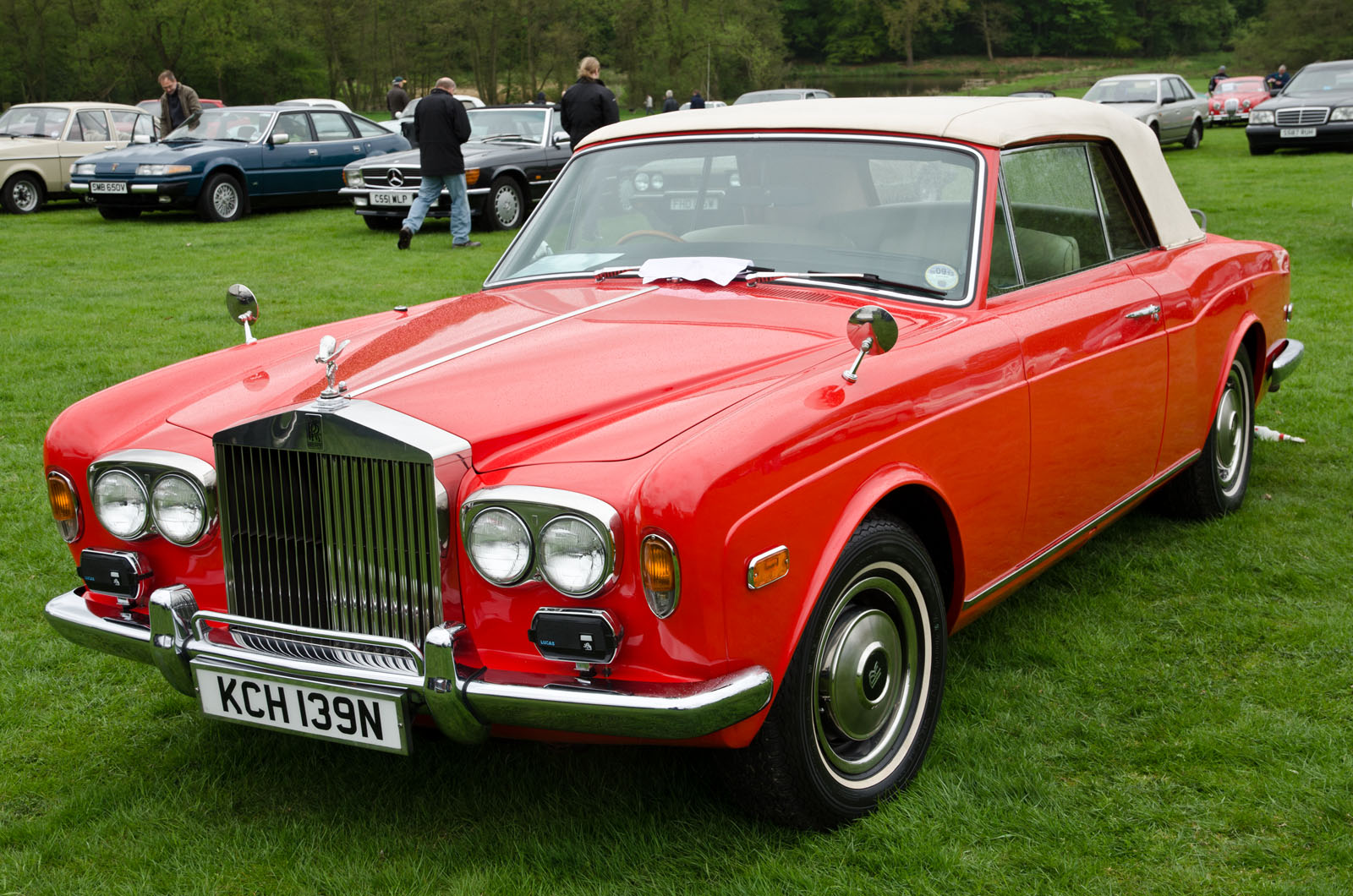
1974–1977 Rolls-Royce Corniche convertible (Europe)

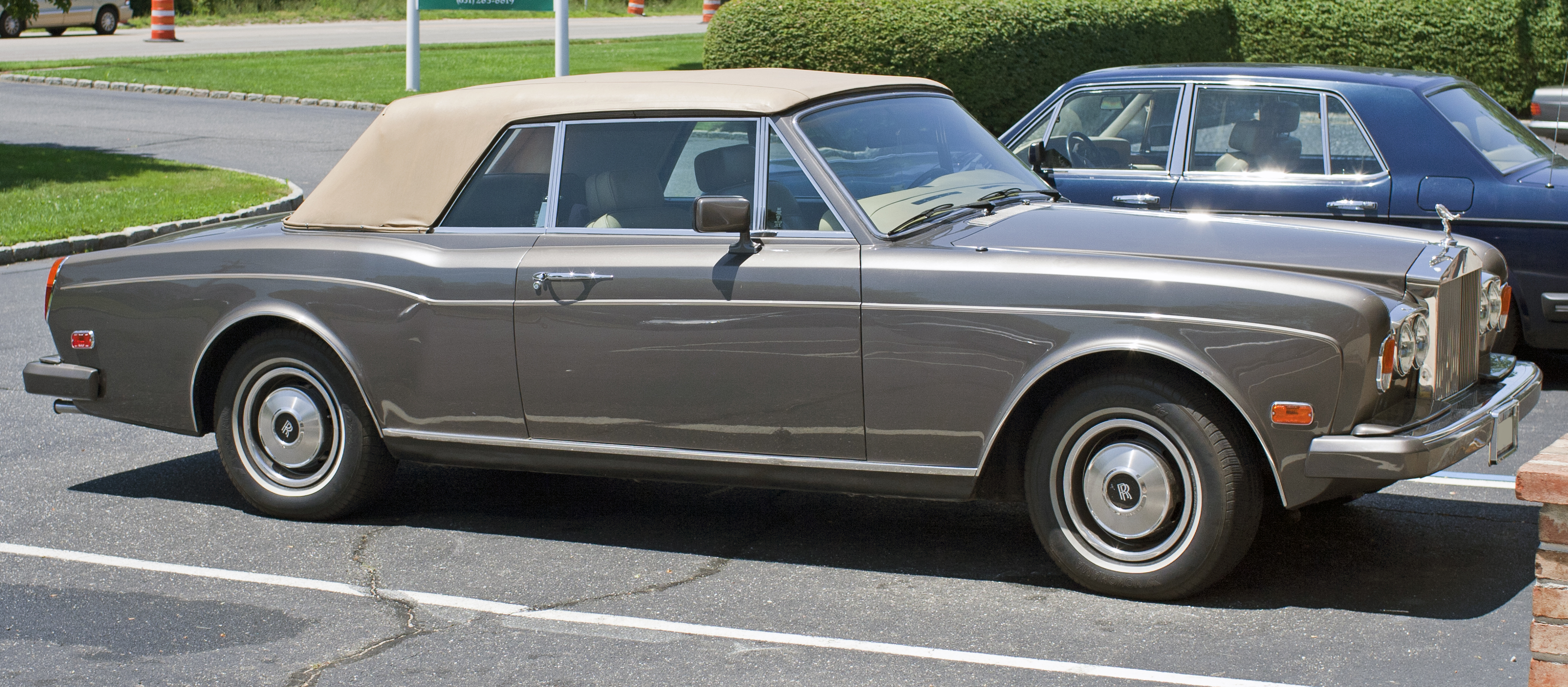
1985 Rolls-Royce Corniche convertible (North America)

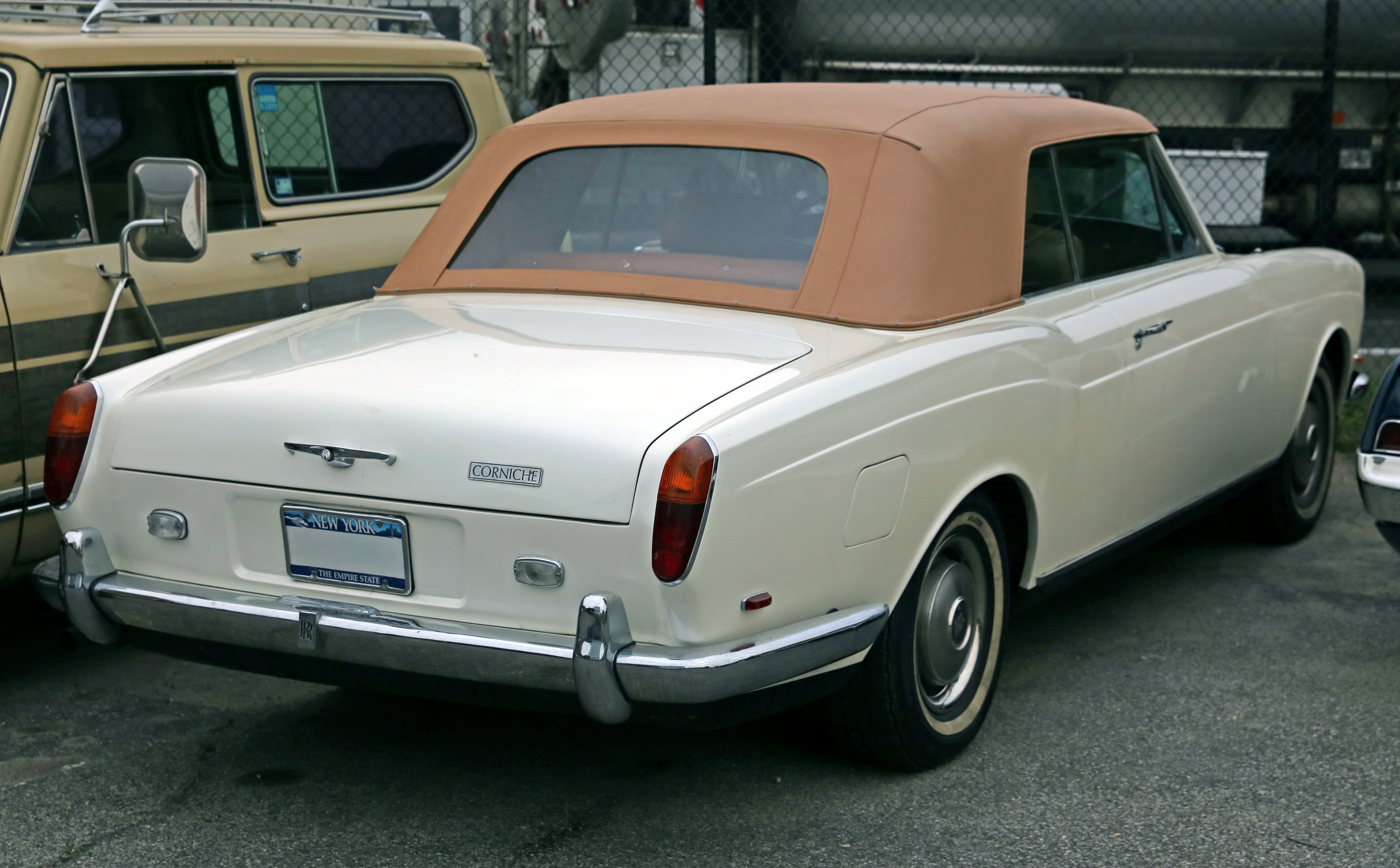
1971 Rolls-Royce Corniche convertible (rear view)

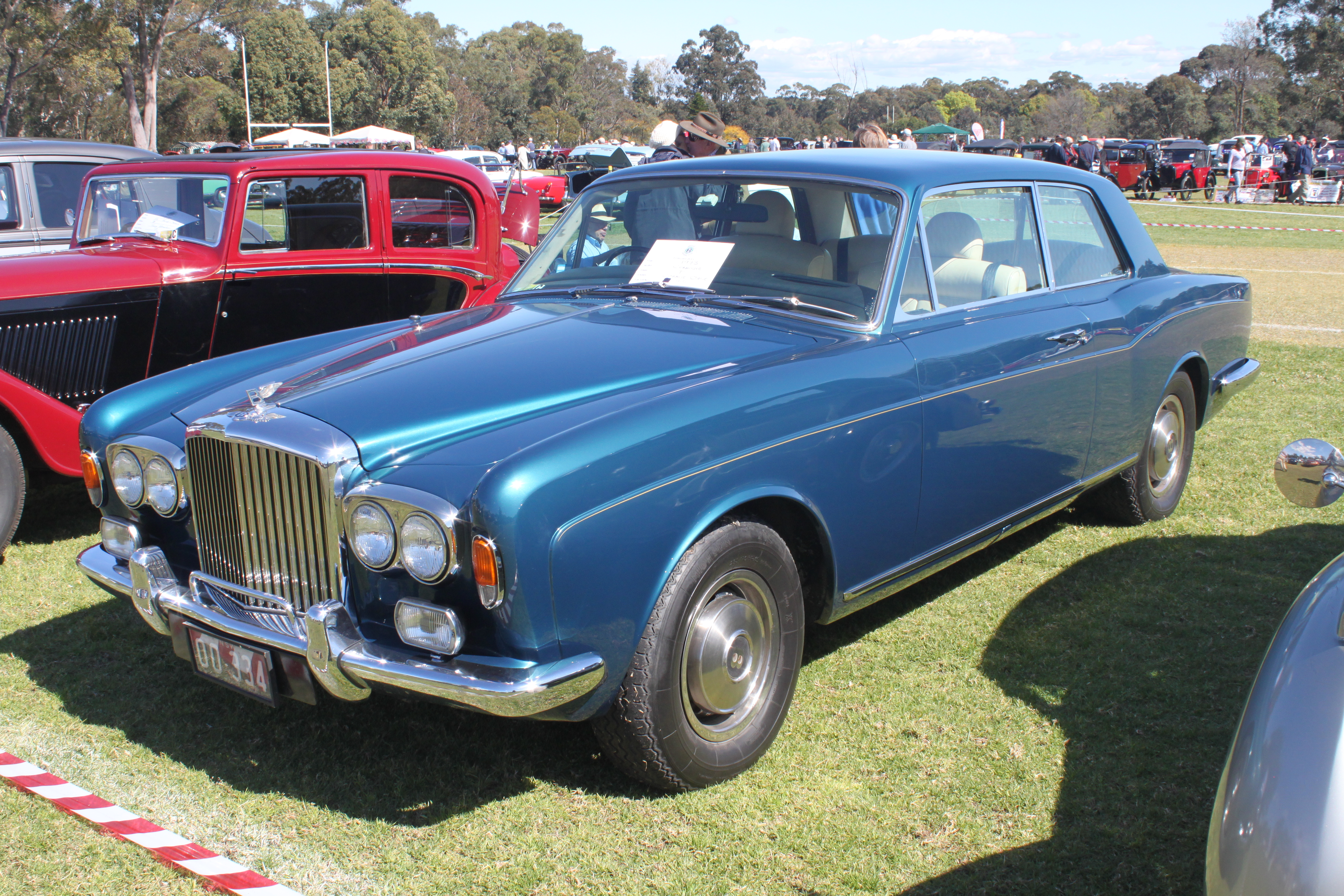
1973 Bentley Corniche coupé

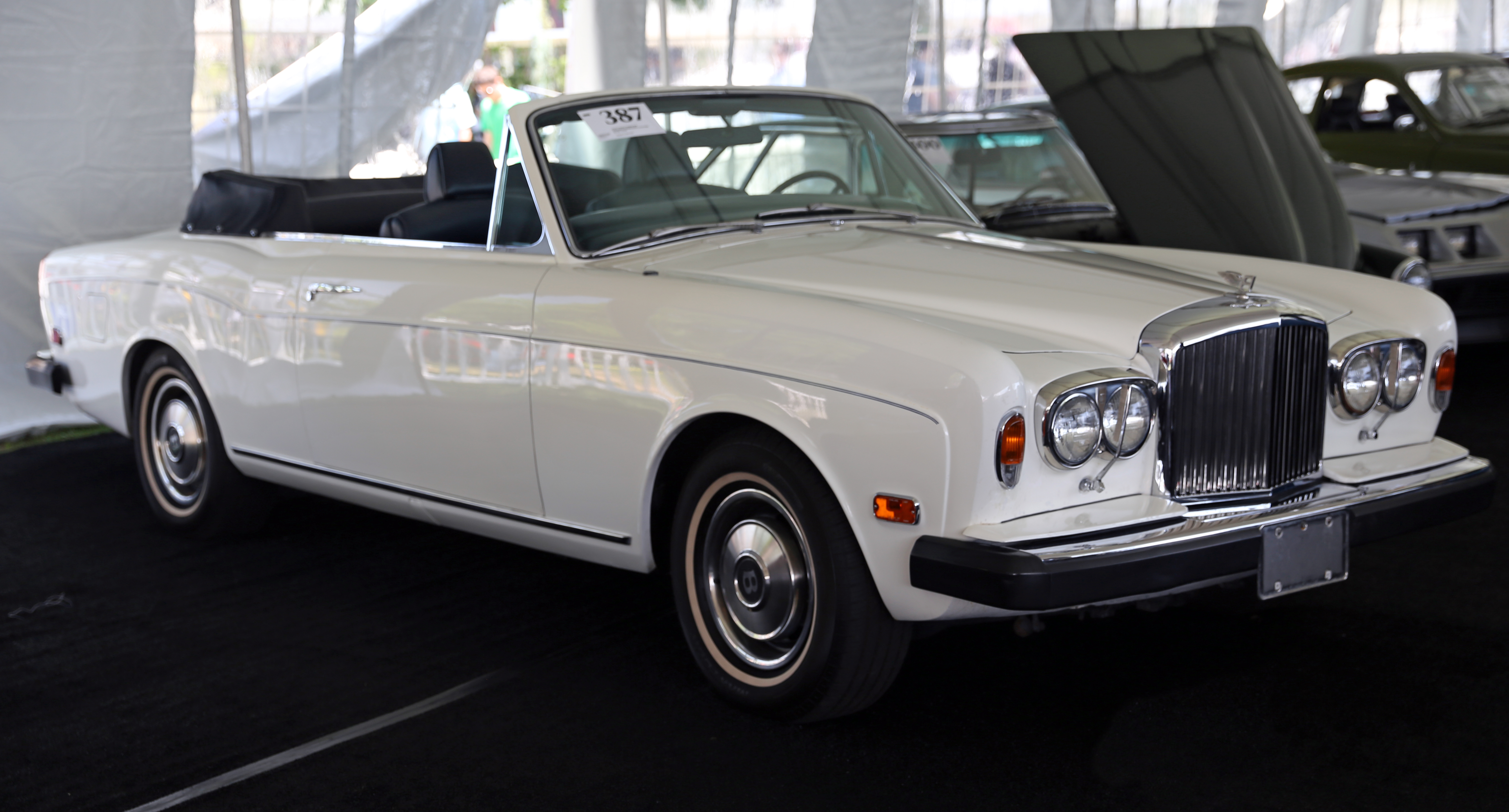
1974 Bentley Corniche convertible (US Spec)

== Corniche II (1986–1989) ==
Corniche II
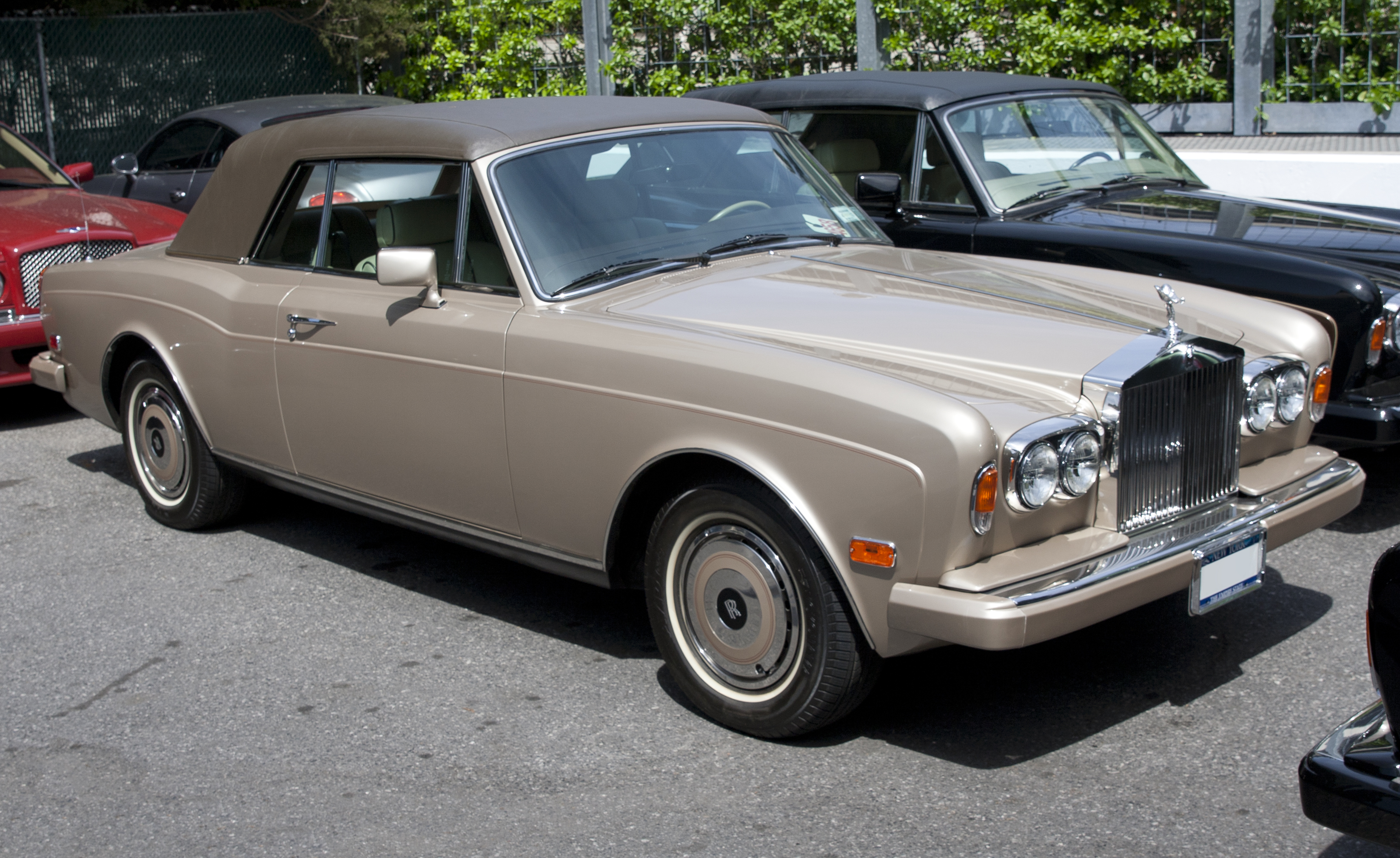
- 1989 Rolls-Royce Corniche II

Overview
- Production: 1986–1989
- Assembly: United Kingdom: London, England

Body and chassis
- Body style: 2-door convertible
- Related: Bentley Continental

Powertrain
- Engine: 6.75 L L410/L410I OHV V8
- Transmission: 3-speed automatic

Dimensions
- Wheelbase: 120.5 in (3,061 mm)

The Corniche II name was applied for the United States market from 1986 and for other markets from 1988. Anti-lock brakes were added for 1988, but air bags would not be available until the Corniche III. Also new for 1988 were some detail changes to the interior. In 1988, it received a new reverse warning lens type and pattern around the rear license plate, as well as newly designed seats and redesigned instrumentation.

1,234 examples of the Corniche II were produced.

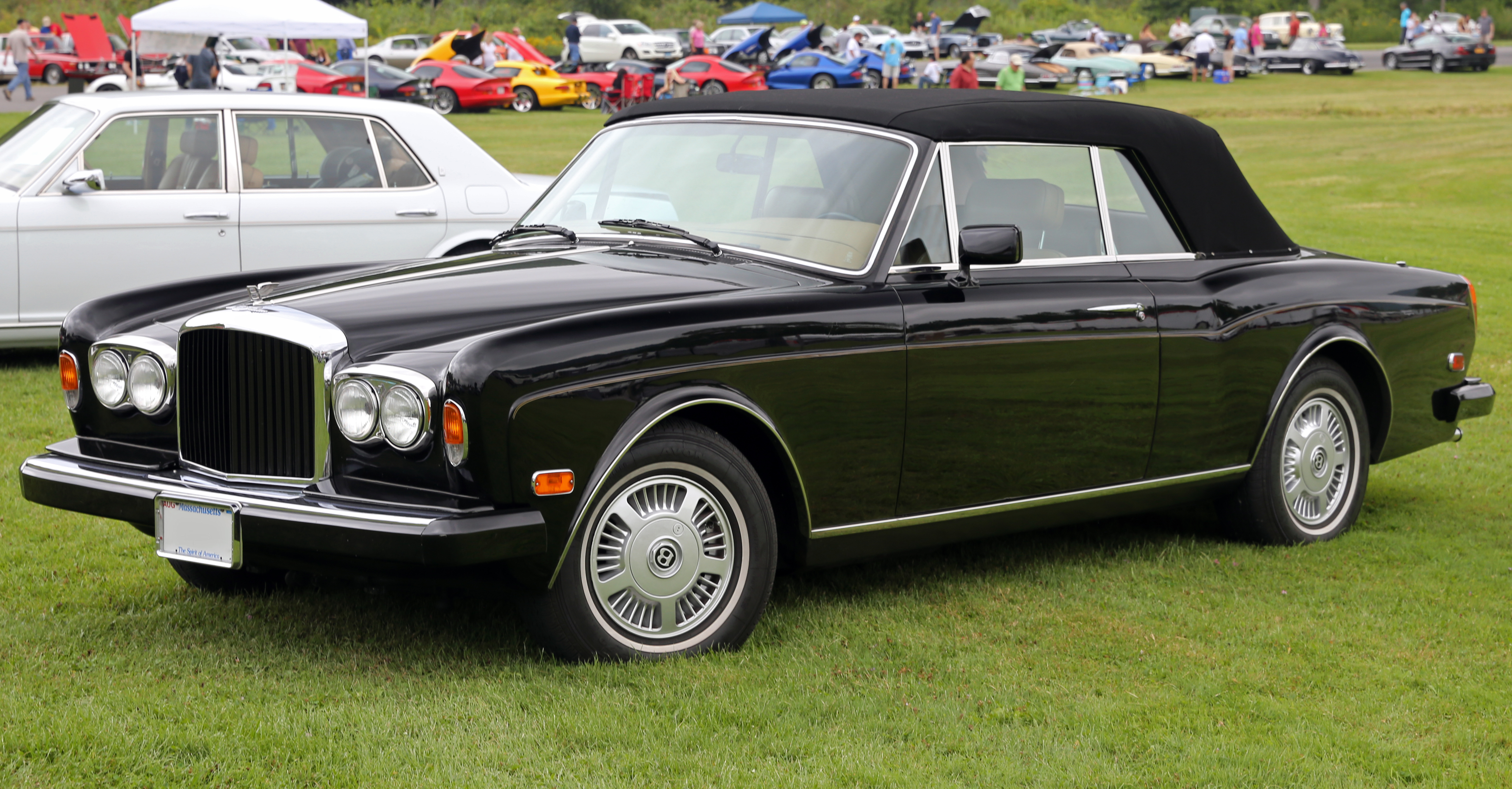
1987 Bentley Continental

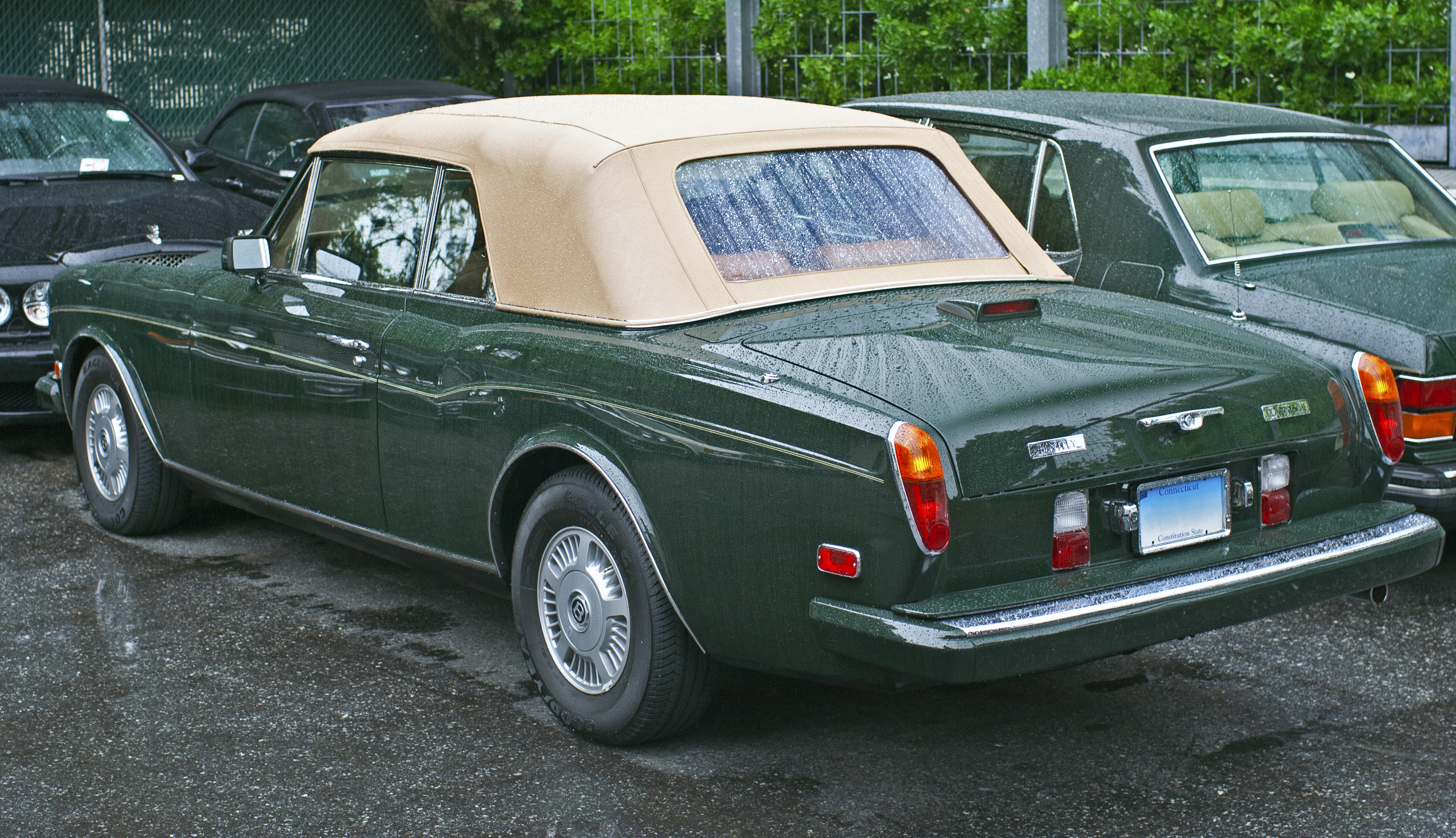
1988 Bentley Continental (rear view; US)

== Corniche III (1989–1993) ==
Corniche III
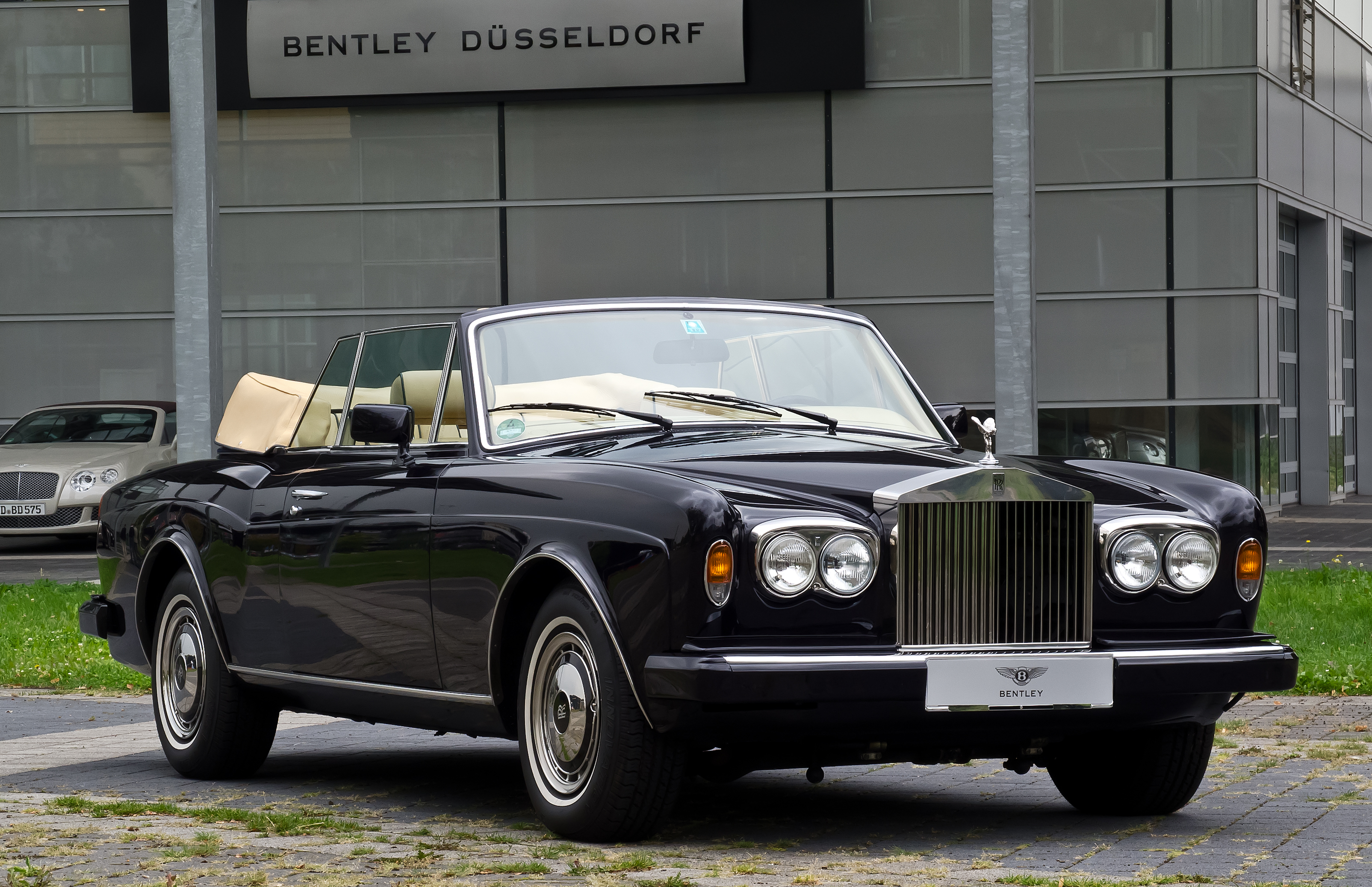
- Rolls-Royce Corniche III

Overview
- Production: 1989–1993
- Assembly: United Kingdom: London, England

Body and chassis
- Related: Bentley Continental

Powertrain
- Engine: 6.75 L L410I OHV V8
- Transmission: 3-speed automatic

Dimensions
- Wheelbase: 120.5 in (3,061 mm)
- Length: 207.0 in (5,258 mm)
- Width: 72.3 in (1,836 mm)
- Height: 59.8 in (1,519 mm)

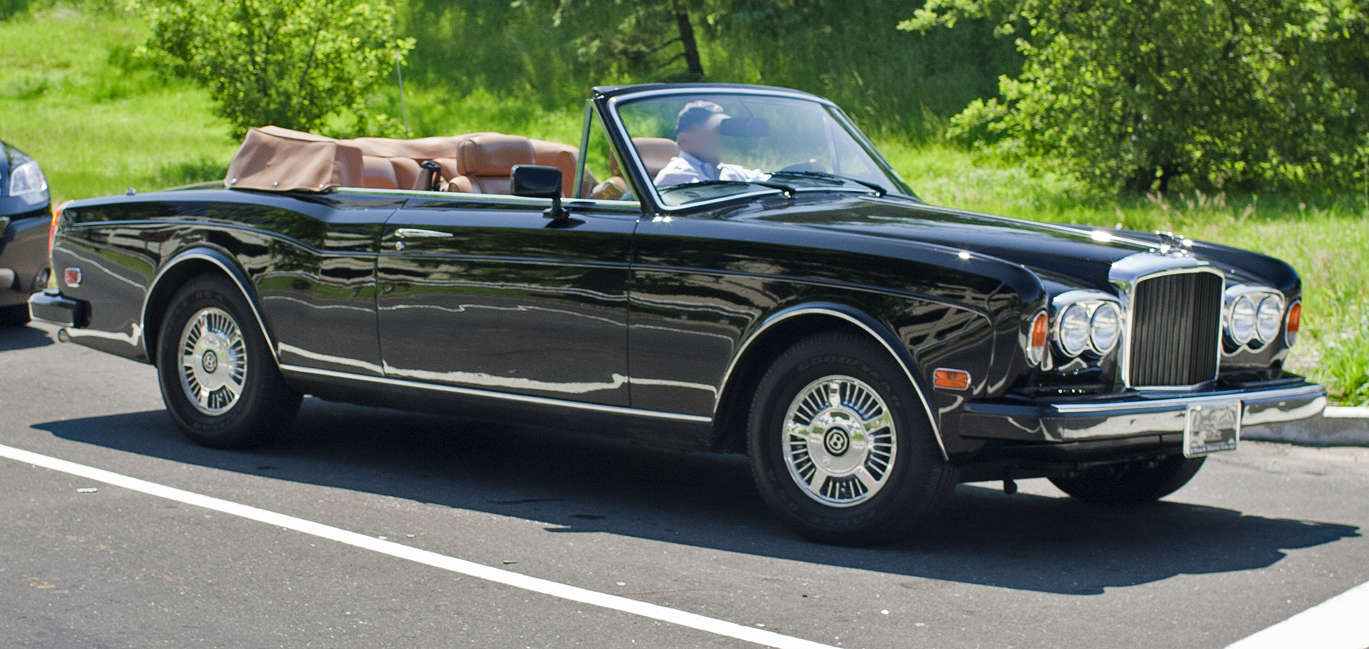
1990 Bentley Continental

The Corniche III was introduced at the 1989 Frankfurt Motor Show with new alloy wheels, color-coded bumpers, a more advanced suspension system, air bags and MK-Motronic fuel injections. Minor interior changes included a revised dashboard, console and seats. 452 examples were made.

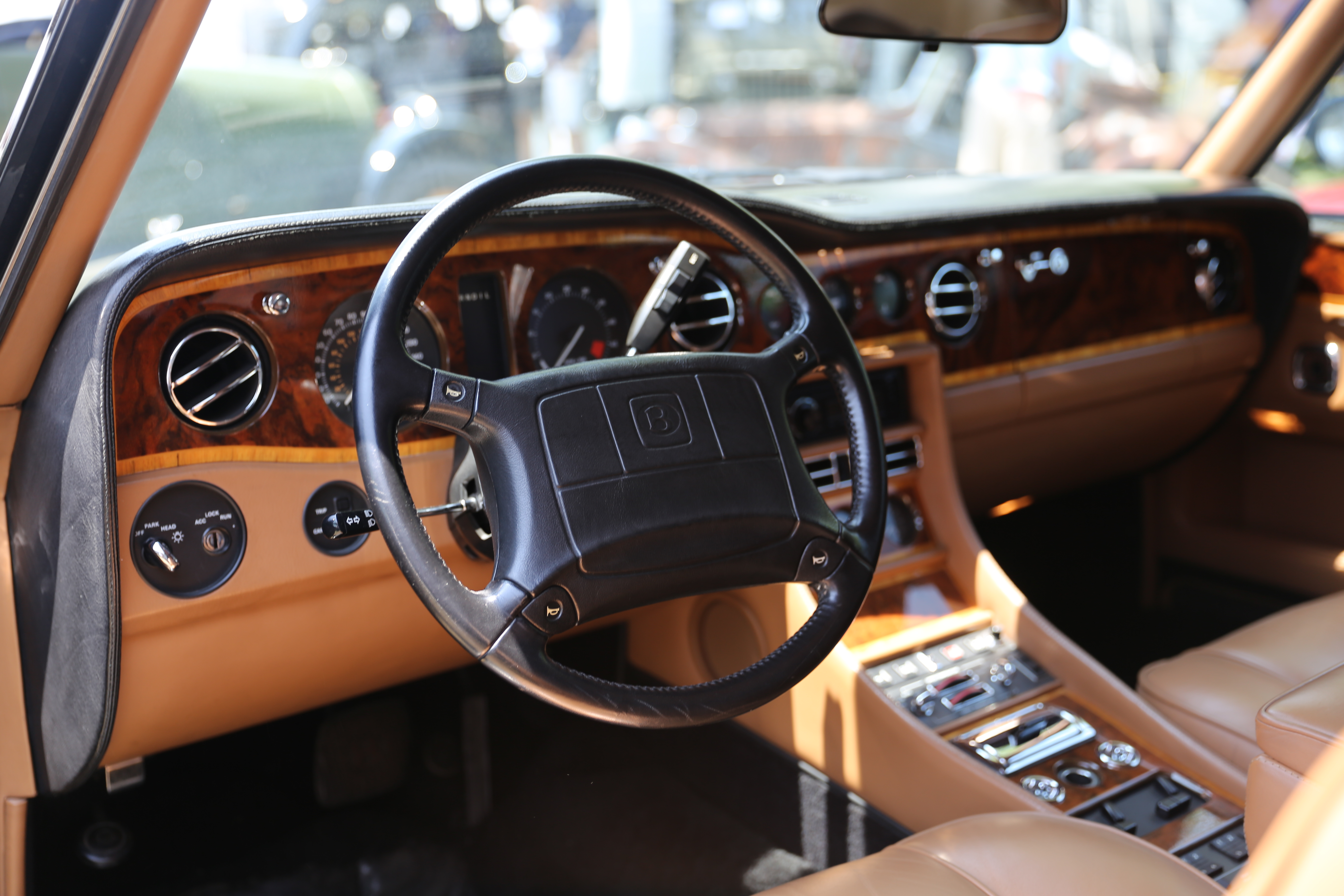
The revised, airbag-equipped dashboard, Continental Example shown (1990)

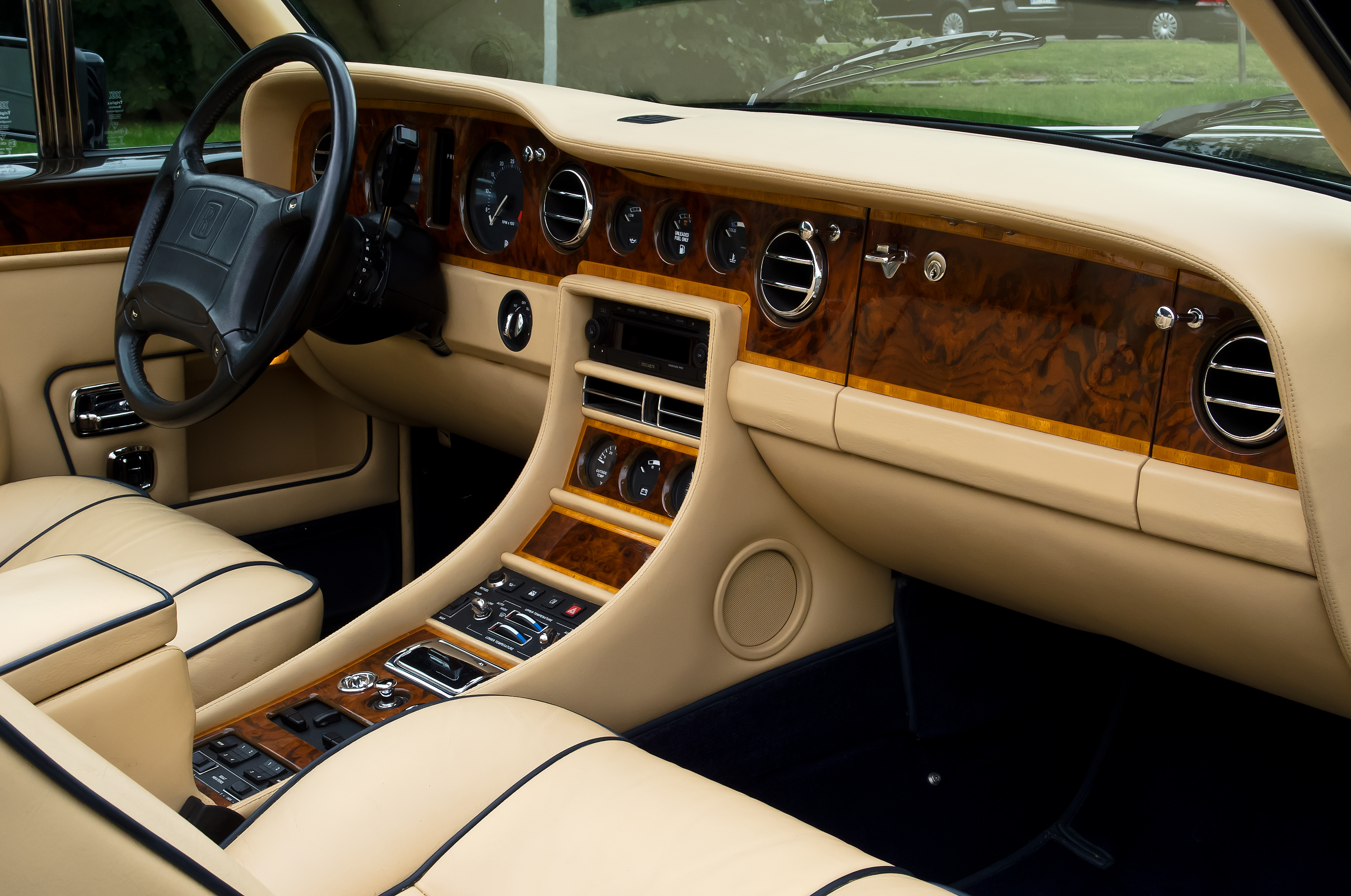
Rolls-Royce Corniche III Interior

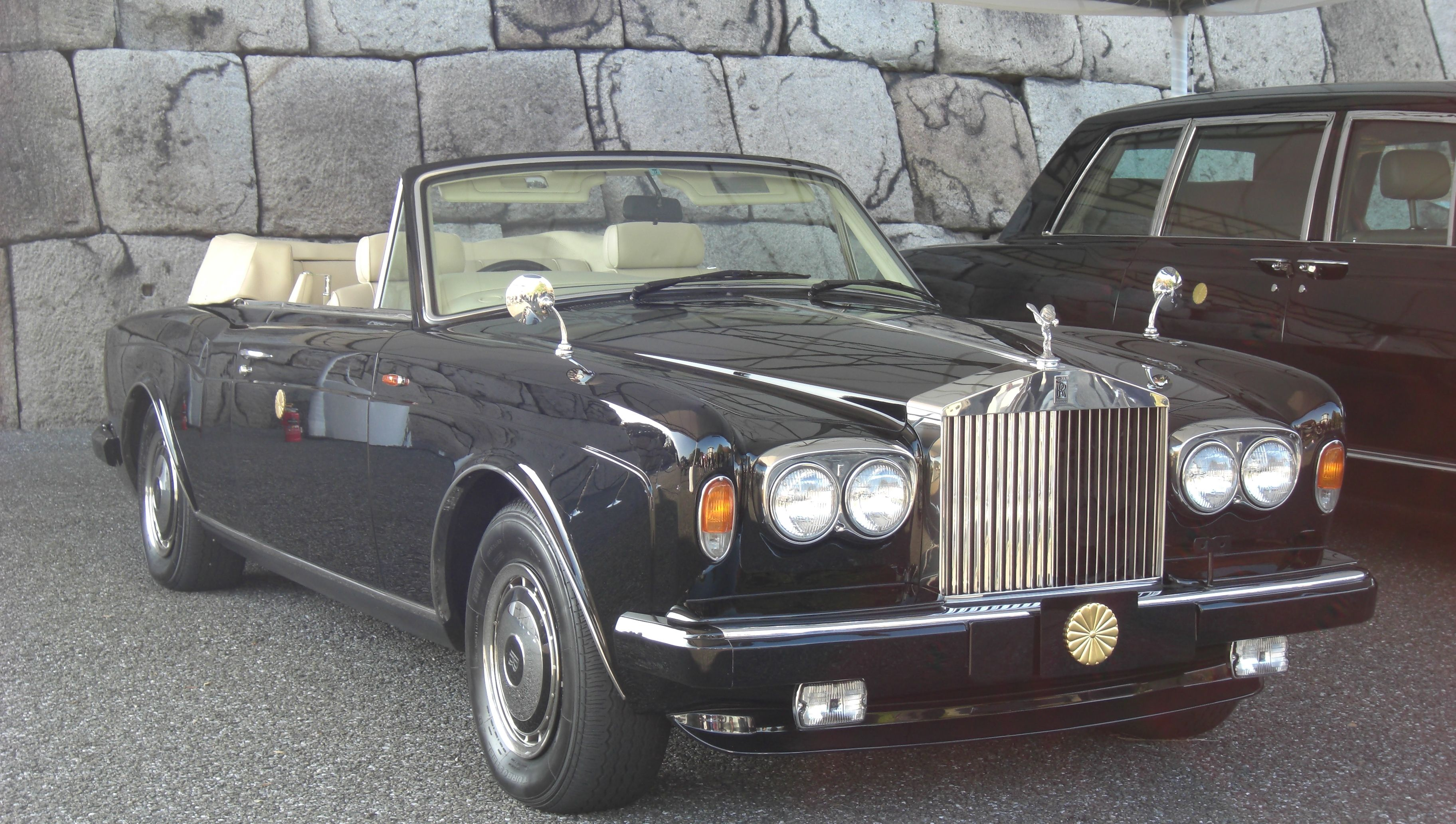
Japanese Emperor Akihito's parade car (1990)

== Corniche IV (1992–1995) ==
Corniche IV
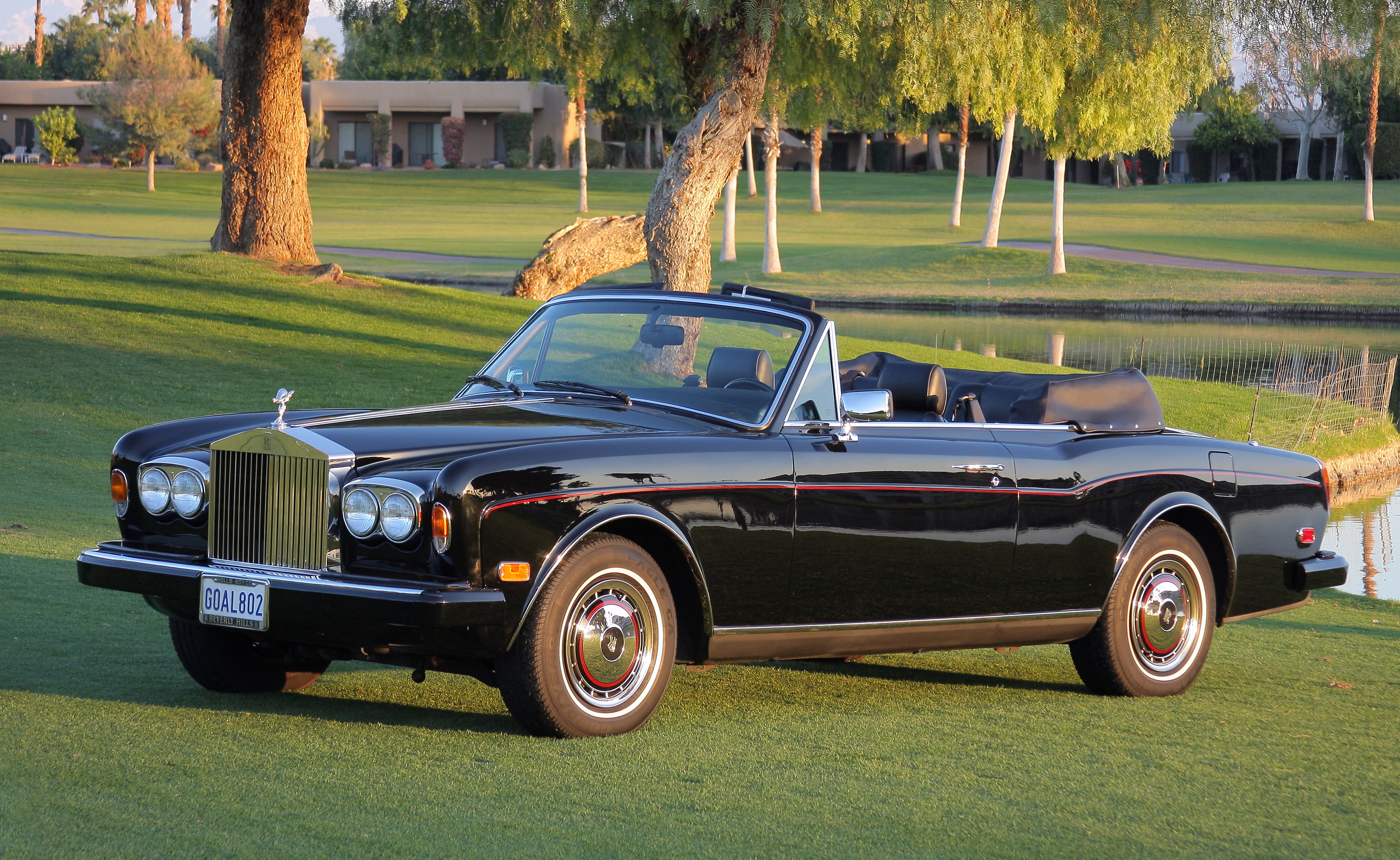
- 1994 Rolls-Royce Corniche IV

Overview
- Production: 1992–1995
- Assembly: United Kingdom: Crewe, England

Body and chassis
- Related: Bentley Continental

Powertrain
- Engine: 6.75 L L410I OHV V8; 6.75 L L410IT turbo OHV V8
- Transmission: 4-speed 4L80-E automatic

Dimensions
- Wheelbase: 120.5 in (3,061 mm)
- Length: 204.6 in (5,197 mm)
- Width: 72.3 in (1,836 mm)
- Height: 59.8 in (1,519 mm)

The car was reworked for 1992 as the Corniche IV, presented at the January North American International Auto Show in Detroit. By this time, production had moved to Crewe in preparation for the 1994 closure of Mulliner Park Ward. Mechanically, the IV featured the four-speed 4L80-E automatic transmission rather than the previous three-speed GM400 unit. Adaptive suspension was also introduced. Visually, there is nearly no difference between the Corniche III and IV except for a glass rear window replacing the previous plastic unit. The convertible top mechanism was improved, no longer requiring manual latching. CFC-free air conditioning was specified, as were driver and passenger airbags.

In October 1992, a 21st anniversary Corniche was presented. Twenty-five cars were built, all finished in Ming Blue with a cream hood and a silver plaque on the dash.

In August 1993, engine power was increased by 20 percent.

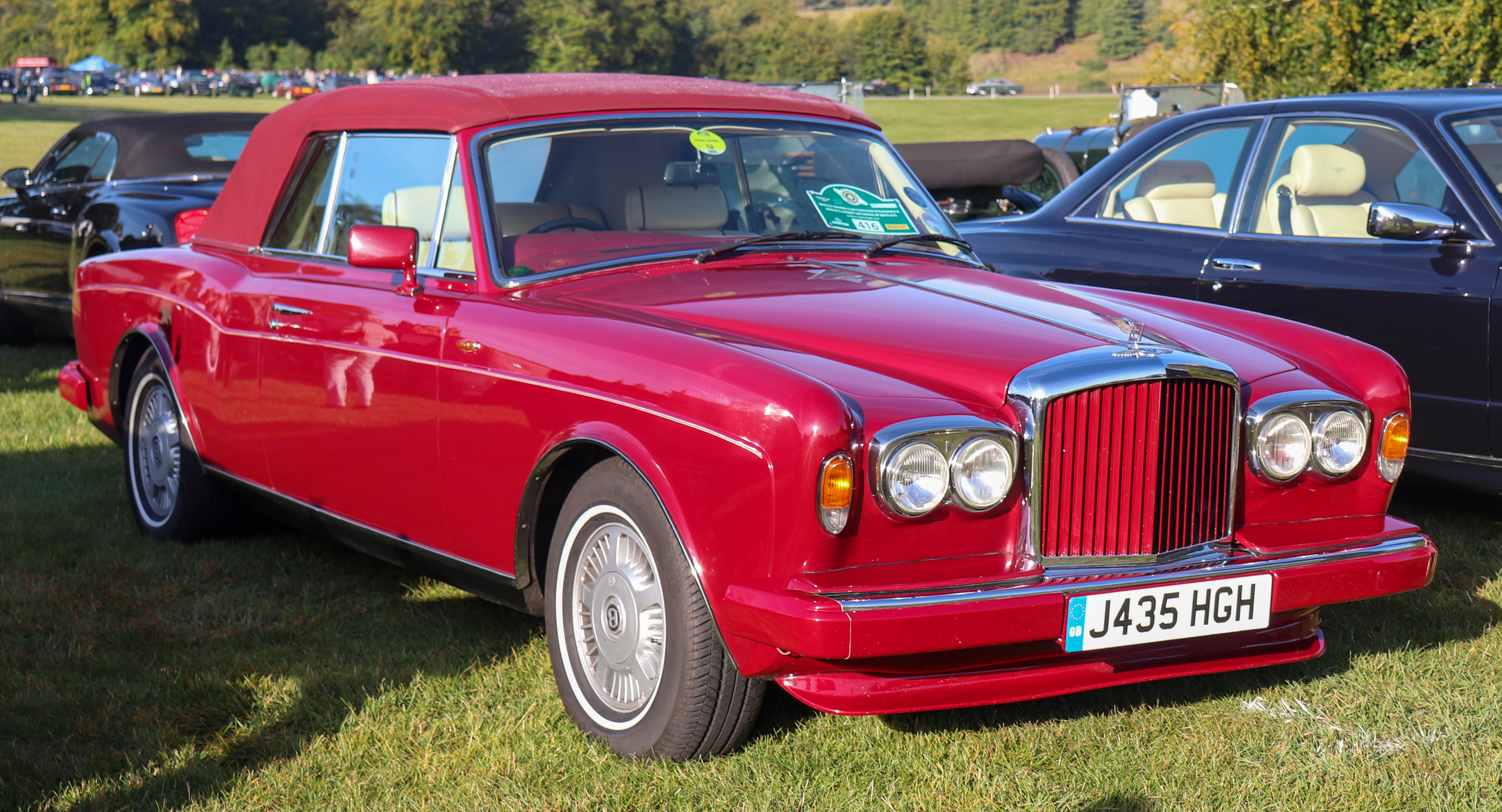
Front view of 1992 Bentley Continental

=== Corniche S ===
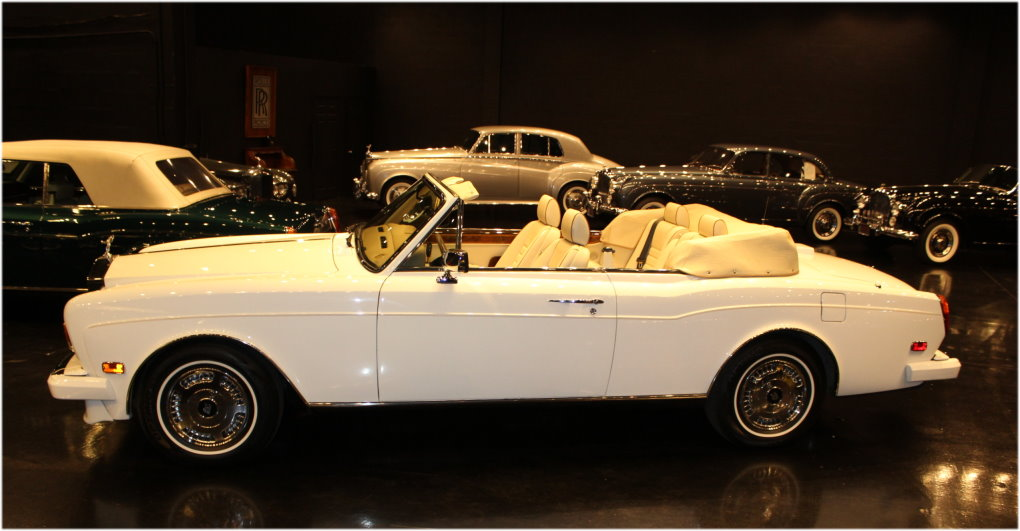
Rolls-Royce Corniche S

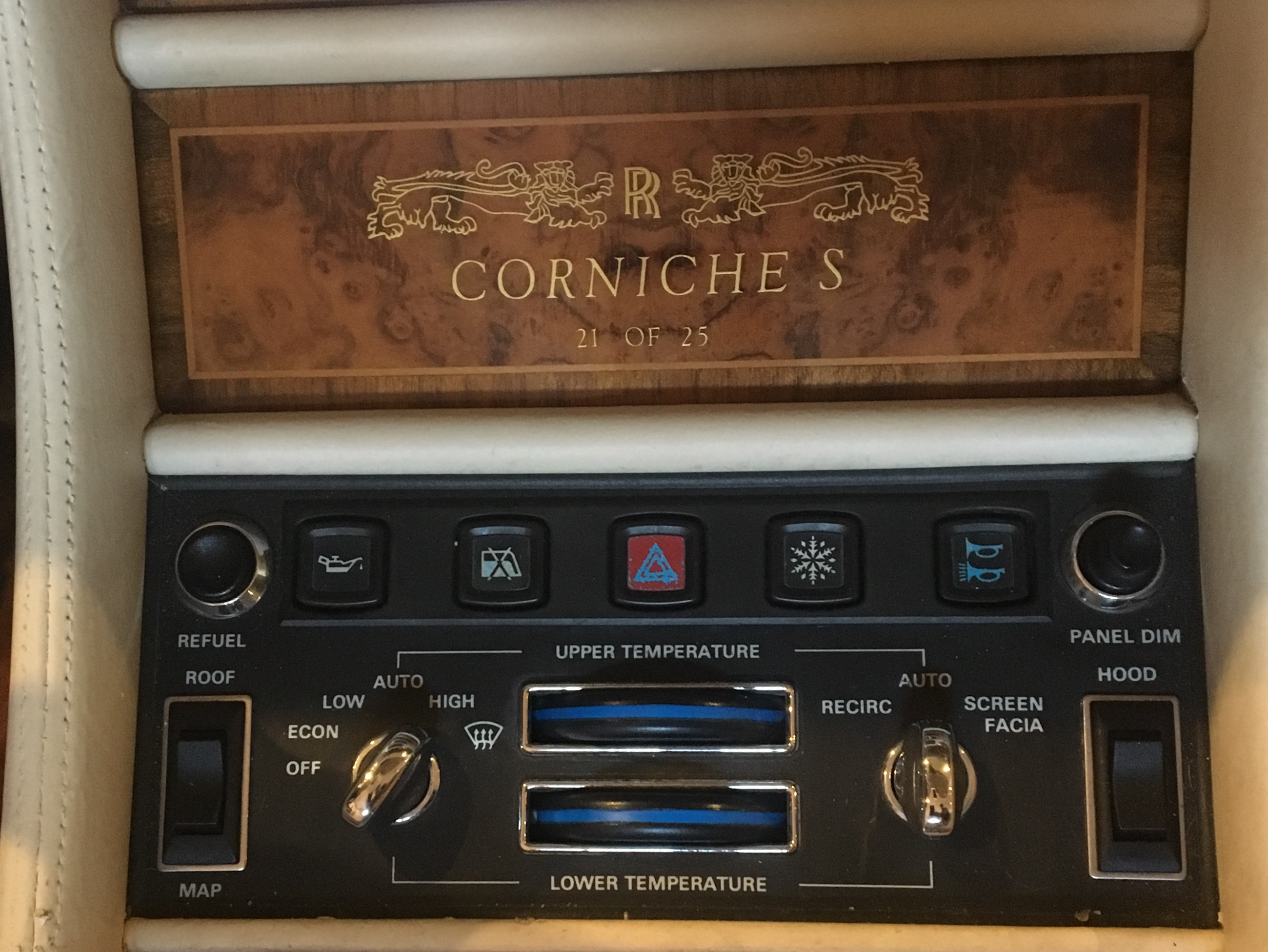
The dashboard plate of the last Corniche S

The last 25 Corniche IV models to be built were unique turbocharged versions, designated the Corniche S. Completed in the summer of 1995, they came with an individually numbered dashboard plate.

== Corniche V (2000–2002) ==
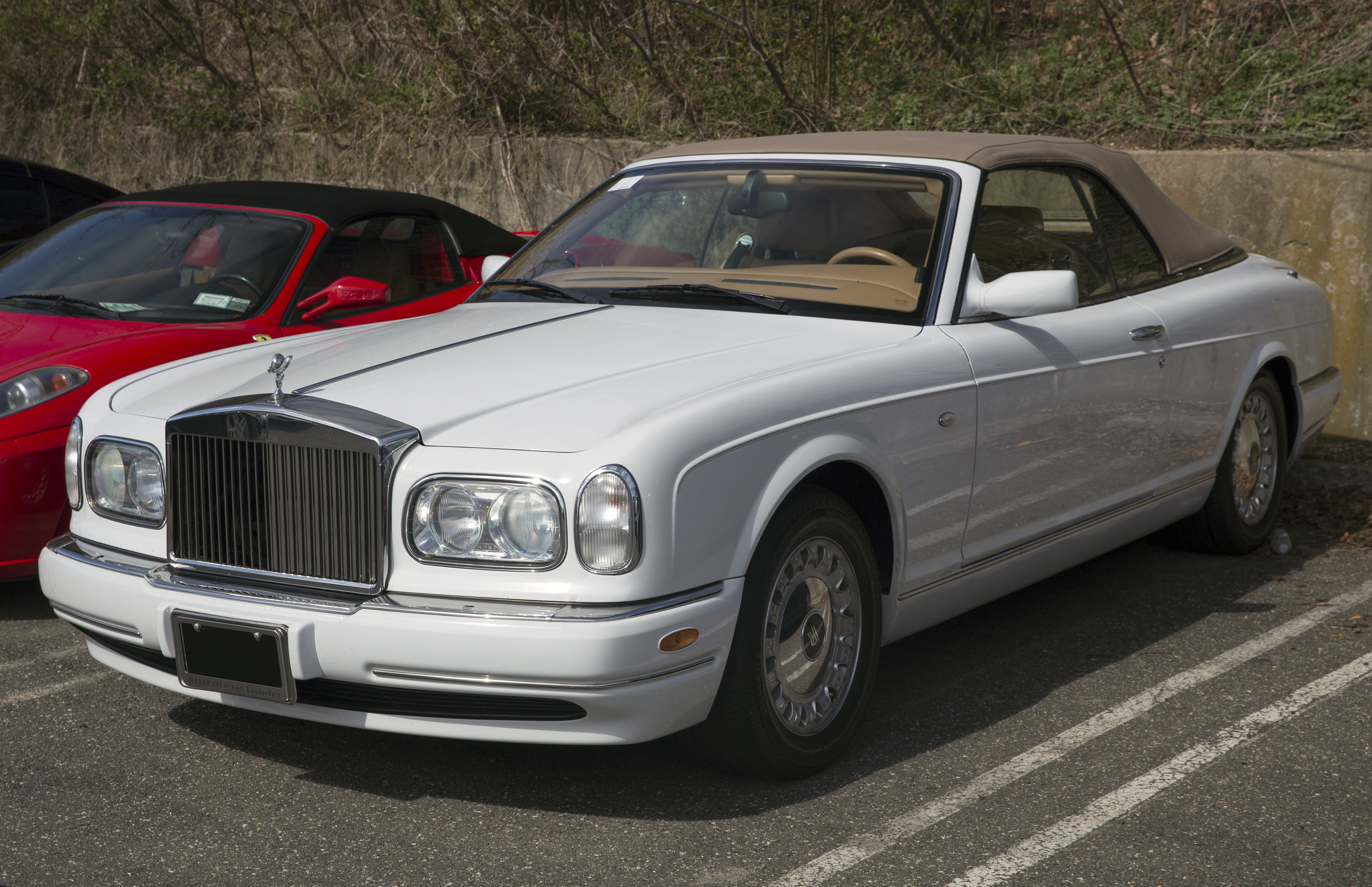
2000 Rolls-Royce Corniche V

The fifth series to bear the Corniche name made its debut in January 2000. At the time of its release, it was the most expensive vehicle offered by Rolls-Royce, with a base price of US$359,900. 384 Corniche V were made, with the last 45 being designated as "Final Series" Corniches. Production ended in August 2002, after Bentley had become a subsidiary of Volkswagen AG and taken over the Crewe manufacturing site. The rights to the Rolls-Royce name and trademarks were licensed by Rolls-Royce Aero Engines to BMW, building their cars in a new factory built by BMW on the Goodwood Estate near Chichester, West Sussex.

== Production ==
- Rolls-Royce Corniche I: 4,332
  - Saloon (1971–1981): 1,108
  - Convertible (1971–1988): 3,224
- Bentley Corniche: 140
  - Saloon (1971–1981): 63
  - Convertible (1971–1984): 77
- Rolls-Royce Corniche II (1988–1989): 1,234
- Rolls-Royce Corniche III (1989–1992): 452
- Rolls-Royce Corniche IV (1992–1995): 244
  - Corniche IV (1992–1995): 219
  - Corniche S (1995): 25
- Rolls-Royce Corniche V (2000–2002): 384
- Corniche V "Final Series": 45
- Bentley Continental (1984–1994): 421
  - Bentley Continental Turbo (1992–1995): 8

== See also ==
- Rolls-Royce Corniche (2000)
- Rolls-Royce 100EX
- Rolls-Royce Phantom Drophead Coupé
