= List of Rolls-Royce personnel codes =

The Rolls-Royce company used an internal list of personnel shortcodes to identify its senior engineers and designers. These were usually based on a shortened form of the surname, later the initials. Such codes appeared on technical drawings and internal memos. The identities behind these codes represent an important part of the company history, especially during the period of intense development immediately before and during World War II.

Name	Code	
Stanley Bull	SB	Late WWII, began work on planning for the post-war cars
Calvert	Cal	Aero Service (aero-engine product support), early WWII
F R Danby	Dy	
Ray Dorey	Dor	
Tony Dunwel	Dnl	
James Ellor	Lr	Carburettor and inlet system designer of the Goshawk Lead designer for supercharging up to 1928
Albert George Elliott	E	Chief Engineer, Aero Division
Ivan Evernden	Ev	(H. I. F. Evernden)
William Gill	WG	Financial Director
Len Hall	LBH	Assistant Design Engineer to Lovesey on the Kestrel, later the Merlin
Ronnie Harker	Hkr	RAF liaison pilot (WWII), heavily involved with development of the Merlin-engined Mustang, later executive
R W Harvey-Bailey	By	
Lionel Haworth	LH	
Ernest Hives	Hs	
Stanley Hooker	SGH	
Mick Hoolahan	Hln	Patents Manager at Derby, c. 1960
A J Lidsey	Lr	Development of sporting cars
Adrian Lombard	Lom	
Cyril Lovesey	LOV	
John Maddocks	Mx	
John Morley	JM	Head of Lucas Gas Turbine Equipment
Tom Nadin	Na	Involved with the development of the harmonic damper for the six-cylinder car, c. 1906.
Sir Denning Pearson	Psn	Chief executive and chairman, c. 1970
Eric Platford	EP	
E W Punt	EWP	
W A Robotham	Rm	known as Roy, engine designer WWII, developed Rolls-Royce Meteor tank engine
A J Rowledge	Rg	
Henry Royce	R	
Arthur Rubbra	Rbr	
Lord Herbert Scott	L.H.S.	Chairman, from c1937
Harry Swift	Sft	Production Manager, Derby: early WWII
Ivan Waller	IMW	
Geoff Wilde	GLW	
Harry Wood	Wd	Engineer on the development of sleeve valve compression ignition engines

== Sources ==
- Clarke, Tom C. (2003). Royce and the Vibration Damper. Technical Series. Rolls-Royce Heritage Trust. ISBN 1-872922-18-X. Nº 6.
- Harvey-Bailey, Alec (1983). The Merlin in Perspective. Rolls-Royce Heritage Trust. ISBN 0-9511710-1-1. Nº 2.
- Harvey-Bailey, Alec (1989). The Sons Of Martha. Rolls-Royce Heritage Trust. Nº 14.
- Harvey-Bailey, Alec; Piggott, Dave (1992). The Merlin 100 Series. Rolls-Royce Heritage Trust. ISBN 1-872922-03-1. Nº 19.
- Harvey-Bailey, Alec (1992). Hives' Turbulent Barons. Rolls-Royce Heritage Trust. Nº 20.
- Heathcote, Roy (1992). Rolls-Royce Dart. Rolls-Royce Heritage Trust. ISBN 1-872922-03-1. Nº 18.
- Nahum; Foster-Pegg; Birch (1994). The Rolls-Royce Crecy. Rolls-Royce Heritage Trust. ISBN 1-872922-05-8. Nº 21.
- Pearson, Harry (1989). Rolls-Royce and the Rateau Patents. Technical Series. Rolls-Royce Heritage Trust. Nº 1.
- Rowbotham, William Arthur (1970). Silver Ghosts and Silver Dawn. London: Constable. p. 17.
- Rubbra, A.A. (1990). Rolls-Royce Piston Aero Engines - a designer remembers. Rolls-Royce Heritage Trust. ISBN 1-872922-00-7. Nº 16.
