= Lovesey =

Lovesey is a surname. Notable people with the surname include:

- Cyril Lovesey (1899–1976), English engineer
- Peter Lovesey (1936–2025), English writer
