= Adrian Lombard =

20th-century English aeronautical engineer

- Born: 19 January 1915; Coventry, England
- Died: 13 July 1967 (aged 52)
- Education: Coventry Technical College
- Engineering career
- Employer(s): Morris Motors; Rover; Rolls-Royce Limited
- Projects: Rolls-Royce Derwent, Rolls-Royce Nene
- Significant advance: Aero engines
- Awards: CBE

Adrian Albert "Lom" Lombard, CBE (19 January 1915 – 13 July 1967) was an English aeronautical engineer. Despite having no formal training in aerodynamics, he became one of the world's foremost designers of jet engines. He was involved with the Rolls-Royce company in a variety of roles for almost 30 years.

== Biography ==
Adrian Lombard was born in the city of Coventry, Warwickshire, on 19 January 1915. He was the second of three sons of Arthur, a toolmaker, and Louisa. Lombard was taught at the John Gulson Central Advanced School, and later attended evening classes at the Coventry Technical College. After leaving school at the age of 15, he began training in the drawing office of the Rover Company.

== Early career ==
After spending five years with Rover, Lombard took a job with Morris Motors Limited where he was put in charge of engine stress calculations and worked as a motor car engineer. However, he returned to Rover in 1936 and within four years was part of Maurice Wilks' design team. In April 1940 Lombard began his work with jet engines when the team was entrusted with the task of preparing the Whittle W.2B jet engine for production. His designs during this period incorporated a new combustion system and were the precursor to the later successful Rolls-Royce Derwent and Nene engines, which powered most of the first generation of British jet fighters.

== Rolls-Royce ==
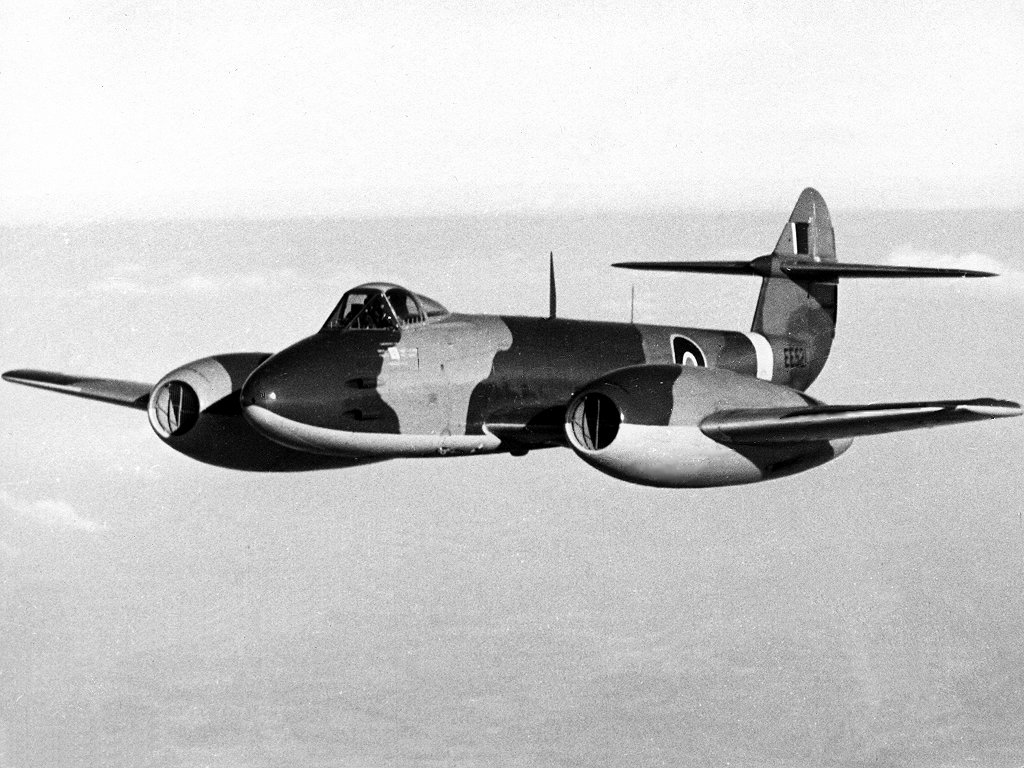
A Gloster Meteor, which was powered by the Derwent engine designed by Lombard.

In 1943, Rover and Rolls-Royce completed a deal in which the latter took over interest in the jet engine production factories in Clitheroe and Barnoldswick. Lombard subsequently joined Rolls-Royce and was appointed chief engine designer of factories in the north of England. He assembled a team that built 100 of the W.2B engines for use in Gloster Meteor fighter planes, while simultaneously supervising the design of the Derwent engine. In October 1945, a Meteor equipped with Derwent V engines broke the world speed record at 603 mph (970 km/h). The design centre was relocated to Derby in 1946, and there Lombard became chief projects designer. His team designed the Avon engine, which powered the Fairey Delta, the first aeroplane to exceed 1,000 mph (1,600 km/h), and other civil jet aircraft including the de Havilland Comet, the first jet airliner to make a scheduled transatlantic flight. In 1949, Lombard was promoted to chief designer at the Derby plant, and was made Rolls-Royce's chief aeronautical designer three years later.

Lombard was appointed chief engineer at Rolls-Royce in 1954, and around this time he was involved in the production of the world's first 'bypass turbojet' or turbofan engine, the Conway, which was used in the Vickers VC10 and installed in the Boeing 707 and Douglas DC-8 aircraft. He also joined the council of the Royal Aeronautical Society, and was also involved with the Air Registration Board and the Aeronautical Research Council. Lombard became the director of the Rolls-Royce aeronautical engine division in 1958, and was responsible for overseeing the production of all the company's jet turbines. Under his guidance, the company worked on new technology for building jet engines solely from reinforced plastics. This technology was later used in the production of the RB211 engine; its fan blades were originally made from plastic reinforced with carbon fibre. However, during a test in which a chicken was thrown into the engine at high speed, to simulate birds flying into the engine during flight, the composite blades shattered and were subsequently replaced with titanium ones in the final design.

In November 1962, Lombard visited Japan to meet with several companies that had expressed an interest in Rolls-Royce's vertical take-off (VTOL) aircraft engines. During the trip, he predicted that such engines would be in general civil use within ten years. Lombard and Stanley Hooker, then technical director of Bristol Siddeley, were jointly awarded the James Clayton award by the Institute of Mechanical Engineers in February 1967, for their pioneering work with vertical take-off engines.

Significantly, Lombard predicted the crossover of lift jet technology to the by-pass engine, where the engine carcasses would be integral with the pod structure, thus reducing engine weight. Lombard indicated that the same principle could be applied to a pair of propulsion engines mounted on an underwing pylon. The by-pass duct would be an integral part of the permanent pod structure, into which the engines are assembled.

In 1966, Adrian Lombard presented the first Royal Society Technology Lecture Aircraft: Power Plants Past, Present and Future. In his presentation, Lombard indicated that the chosen subject was a "very topical one both because of the very advanced technology required for the design and manufacture of aero engines and of the interest which has recently centred on the aircraft industry in this country and the controversy on its future". Among the controversial issues highlighted by Lombard and centering on the aircraft industry was the Duncan Sandys 1957 Defence White paper. The industry had a number of setbacks, perhaps the most drastic of them was the 1957 Defence White Paper, which erroneously forecast that there would be no new crewed aircraft. Following on from the erroneous 1957 White paper and hard on its heels was the Labour government inspired Plowden enquiry that Lombard criticised for causing long term uncertainty for the UK aviation industry. Yet despite the apparent political efforts to stall the British aviation industry, Lombard emphasised that '...the British aero engine industry has retained its technical competitive capability...' and he demonstrated the value of competitive technologies, which led the export of aero engines and returned a major financial contribution to the UK economy: 'The value of engine exports over the last twelve years or so was nearly £650 million excluding engines installed in export aircraft'.

Following his death in July 1967, it was written that Rolls-Royce had been "deprived of one of the finest trouble-shooting engineers in the industry".

Lombard's death had unfortunate consequences for Rolls-Royce when it came to the initial design of the early RB211, which suffered performance problems, the cost of solving-which, ultimately were to lead to the company going into receivership in 1971.

"It was all too obvious that the Derby engineers, normally proud and self-confident to the point of arrogance, had slid from bad to worse when their great leader, Lombard, had been so suddenly plucked from them in 1967, his death had left a vacuum which nobody could fill ..." - Stanley Hooker

Lombard's place at Rolls-Royce was eventually to be filled by former Rolls-Royce and Bristol Siddeley engineer Stanley Hooker, who had by then retired, and under his leadership, assisted by fellow Rolls-Royce ex-retirees Arthur Rubbra and Cyril Lovesey, the RB211 went on to become a most successful design.

== Personal life ==
Lombard was married to Joan Taylor on 18 April 1940 and the couple had three children, one of whom died in infancy. He was appointed a CBE in the Queen's Birthday Honours in June 1967. Lombard died suddenly of a brain haemorrhage at the Derbyshire Royal Infirmary in Derby on 13 July 1967, at the age of 52.

The 'Lombard Award' was established by Rolls-Royce in his memory, with those in the final year of a company apprenticeship eligible for consideration..

His granddaughter, Fleur, was a firefighter who became the first female firefighter to die in the line of duty in the United Kingdom.
