= Arthur Rowledge =

English engineer (1876–1957)

Arthur Rowledge MBE FRS
- Born: Arthur John Rowledge; 30 July 1876; Peterborough, England
- Died: 11 December 1957 (aged 81); Derby, England
- Known for: Rolls-Royce Merlin; Aero engines
- Awards: MBE; Fellow of the Royal Society
- Scientific career
- Institutions: Napier & Son; Rolls-Royce Limited

Arthur John Rowledge (30 July 1876 – 11 December 1957) was an English engineer who designed the Napier Lion aero engine and was a key figure in the development of the inter-war Rolls-Royce aero piston engines, including the Rolls-Royce Kestrel and the Rolls-Royce Merlin.

== Early life and family ==
Rowledge was born in Peterborough, Northamptonshire in 1876, the son of John and Ann Rowledge. His father was described as a bricklayer in 1881, and had worked on the Crystal Palace at Sydenham. Rowledge's mother was from a family of Lincolnshire farmers. He was the youngest child, and had two brothers and one sister.

He was educated at St Peter's College School, Peterborough, and in May 1891 obtained a Queen's prize for Science.

In June 1905 he married Alice Blincko at St Phillip's Church, Kennington. They had three children together: Jeanie Louise (b. 23 January 1907), John William (b. 17 August 1908) and Donald Henry (28 September 1911).

== Career ==
At the time of the 1891 census, Rowledge was described as an "Apprentice to Engineers Draughtsman", employed at Barford and Perkins.

After completing his apprenticeship, Rowledge was employed as a draughtsman at R. Hoe & Co., a London-branch of an American printing machine company, and henceforth took an interest in intricate mechanisms, which would be pivotal in his later work.

After a brief period working for Easton, Anderson & Goolden, boilermakers, in 1901 Rowledge joined D. Napier & Son as a designer, primarily working on automobiles, and during this period the Napier car won the Gordon Bennett Cup and built what is generally considered to be the first 6-cylinder motor car. In 1905 Rowledge joined the Wolseley Motor Company as Chief Designer, although little of his work during this period is known.

Rowledge re-joined D. Napier & Son in 1913 as Chief Designer. After initially designing car engines for the company, the outbreak of World War I meant that the Napier company focussed on aero engines, and Rowledge penned the Napier Lion aero engine during this period. The Lion engine was developed to a power of 450 hp by the end of the war, and claimed numerous records in the post-war period, for example winning the 1919 Aerial Derby. He was awarded an MBE for his work on the Napier Lion engine.

In 1921 Rowledge resigned from Napier and took up a position at Rolls-Royce Limited as "Chief Assistant to Mr F. H. Royce", where he became known as 'Rg' in company shorthand. He is credited with designing the Condor III, the Kestrel and developing the Buzzard into the Rolls-Royce R racing engine, which was used with great success at the 1929 and 1931 Schneider Trophy races.

After the death of Sir Henry Royce in 1933, Rowledge was appointed Chief Consultant, and pushed for development of the revolutionary "Exe" engine; a 1000 hp, air-cooled, sleeve-valve engine with its cylinders arranged in four banks of six into an X-shape. Ultimately, as the development of the Merlin engine continued to improve, and the restriction of resources needed for the war effort, the "Exe" engine was cancelled. Eventually this concept was revived as the Rolls-Royce Pennine.

Development work on the Merlin engine was one of Rowledge's last contributions to aero engine design, before retiring from Rolls-Royce in January 1945 at the age of 69.

== Retirement and death ==
Rowledge lived in Derby following his retirement, suffering from profound deafness in later years. He died on 12 December 1957, aged 81, after a long illness.

== Honours and awards ==
- 26 March 1920 – Member of the Order of the British Empire (MBE). Arthur John Rowledge, Esq. Chief Designer, Messrs. Napier and Son, Limited.
- 1931 – Gold Medal of the Institution of Automobile Engineers for contributions to Schneider Trophy aero engine development, specifically development of the Rolls-Royce R engine.
- 1941 – Fellow of the Royal Society.
