= Cyril Lovesey =

English aeronautical engineer

- Born: 15 July 1899; Hereford, Herefordshire, England
- Died: 1976; Derby, Derbyshire, England
- Education: Bristol University
- Engineering career
- Institutions: Rolls-Royce Limited
- Projects: Rolls-Royce Merlin
- Significant advance: Aero engines
- Awards: CBE

Alfred Cyril Lovesey CBE, AFRAeS, was an English engineer who was a key figure in the development of the Rolls-Royce Merlin aero engine.

== Early life ==
Lovesey was born 15 July 1899 in Hereford the son of Alfred and Jessie Lovesey. In the 1901 Census Lovesey, aged 1 is living with his parents at 3, Greenfield Villas, Portfields, Hereford. He went to Broomy Hill Academy and the grammar school Hereford High School for Boys (became Aylestone Business and Enterprise College). Lovesey attended Bristol University leaving in 1923 with a BSc.

== Career ==
Cyril Lovesey joined the 'Rolls-Royce Experimental Department' in 1923, came under the direction of Ernest Hives and worked on both motor cars and aero engines. He was the company representative for support of the Rolls-Royce R engine during its trials at Calshot for the Schneider Trophy races in 1929 and 1931. Lovesey was a proponent of flight testing and established a centre at RAF Hucknall where he was flight development engineer. His services were also used by Malcolm Campbell during his Bluebird land speed record attempts.

In 1930 Lovesey was awarded Aviators Certificate No. 9350 by the Royal Aero Club. In the late 1930s Lovesey (who had become known as 'Lov' in company shorthand) began working with others on developing the new Rolls-Royce Merlin and just prior to the start of the Battle of Britain was placed in charge of the development programme. His contribution to the Merlin, doubling its power output and improving reliability at the same time, was a major achievement. Post-war, Lovesey adapted the Merlin for civil use and then turned to turbojet development with work on the Rolls-Royce Avon.

In 1957 Lovesey became 'Chief Engineer (Aircraft Engines)' then deputy director of engineering and a member of the Aero Engine Division board of directors. He retired in 1964 but was later recalled along with Arthur Rubbra and Stanley Hooker to assist with development problems concerning the Rolls-Royce RB211 turbofan engine. Lovesey died in 1976.

== Honours and awards ==
- 9 January 1946 - Alfred Cyril Lovesey, Esq., AFRAeS, Development Engineer, Rolls-Royce Ltd is appointed an Officer of the Order the British Empire (OBE).
- 11 June 1966 - Alfred Cyril Lovesey, Esq., OBE, Deputy Director of Engineering, Rolls-Royce Ltd is appointed a Commander of the Order the British Empire (CBE).
