= Stanley Hooker =

British aircraft engine engineer (1907–1984)

- Sir Stanley Hooker
- Born: Stanley George Hooker; 30 September 1907; Sheerness, Kent, England
- Died: 24 May 1984 (aged 76)
- Education: Borden Grammar School, Imperial College, Brasenose College
- Spouses: Margaret Bradbury (m. 1937; div. 1950) Kate Maria Pope (m. 1950)
- Parent(s): William Henry Hooker; Ellen Mary Russell
- Engineering career
- Institutions: Rolls-Royce Limited; Bristol Aeroplane Company
- Projects: Rolls-Royce Derwent, Rolls-Royce Nene, Bristol Olympus, Bristol Orpheus, Bristol Siddeley Pegasus
- Significant advance: Aircraft engines
- Awards: Wilhelm Exner Medal (1982).

Sir Stanley George Hooker, CBE, FRS, DPhil, BSc, FRAeS, MIMechE, FAAAS (30 September 1907 – 24 May 1984), was an English mathematician and jet engine engineer.

He was employed first at Rolls-Royce where he worked on the earliest designs such as the Welland and Derwent, and later at Bristol Aero Engines where he helped bring the troubled Proteus turboprop and the Olympus turbojet to market.

He then designed the famous Pegasus vectored thrust turbofan used in the Hawker Siddeley Harrier.

His autobiography "Not much of an Engineer" was published in 1984 (254 pages) and gives considerable detail about his career and relations with other famous figures.

== Early life ==
Stanley George Hooker was born at Sheerness, the son of a farm labourer who had earlier been a licensed victualler, and educated at Borden Grammar School. He won a scholarship for Imperial College London to study mathematics, and in particular, hydrodynamics. He became more interested in aerodynamics, won the Busk studentship in aeronautics in 1928 and moved to Brasenose College, Oxford where he received his DPhil in this area in 1935.

== Rolls-Royce ==
In late 1937, while working at the Admiralty he applied for a job at Rolls-Royce, and after being interviewed by Ernest Hives, started there in January 1938. He was permitted to study anything that caught his fancy, and soon moved into the supercharger design department. He started researching the superchargers used on the Merlin engine, and calculated that big improvements could be made to their efficiency. His recommendations were put into the production line for newer versions, notably the Merlin 45, improving its power by approximately 30%, and then the Merlin 61.

The Merlin 45 was fitted into the Spitfire Mk V in October 1940, which was produced in the greatest number of any Spitfire variant. The same year the Air Ministry made a request for a turbocharged Merlin for use in the planned high altitude Wellington VI bomber. Declining the suggestion to use turbocharging, Hooker instead designed a two-stage supercharger for the engine, with the resulting two-stage-supercharged Merlin 61 being fitted into the Spitfire Mk IX, the second most-produced Spitfire variant, which entered service in July 1942. The Merlin 61 arrived in time to give the Spitfire a desperately needed advantage in rate of climb and service ceiling over the Focke-Wulf Fw 190.

One major outcome of his work introduced a generalised method of predicting and comparing aircraft engine performance under flight conditions. The status of this work was summarised in an internal Rolls-Royce Report in March 1941 and made public by the Rolls-Royce Heritage Trust in 1997.

In 1940, Hooker was introduced to Frank Whittle, who was setting up production of his first production-quality jet engine, the W.2. In 1941 the Air Ministry had offered contracts to Rover to start production, but Whittle was growing increasingly frustrated with their inability to deliver various parts to start testing the new engine. Hooker was excited, and in turn brought Rolls-Royce chairman Ernest Hives to visit Rover's factory in Barnoldswick. Whittle mentioned his frustrations, and Hives told Whittle to send him the plans for the engine. Soon Rolls' Derby engine and supercharger factories were supplying the needed parts.

Rover was no happier with the state of affairs than Whittle. In 1942, Maurice Wilks of Rover met Hives and Hooker in the Swan and Royal in Clitheroe. Wilks and Hives eventually agreed that Rover would take over production of the Rolls-Royce Meteor tank engine factory in Nottingham and Rolls-Royce would take over the jet engine factory in Barnoldswick. Hooker soon found himself as chief engineer of the new factory, delivering the W.2 as the Welland. Wellands went on to power the earliest models of the Gloster Meteor, and a development of the Welland known as the Derwent powered the vast majority of the later models.

Whittle had moved to the US in 1942 to help General Electric get the W.2 into production there, returning in early 1943. Hooker also visited in 1943, and was surprised to find they had made extensive changes and raised the thrust to 4,000 lbf (18 kN). On his return to England he decided that Rolls should recapture the power lead, and in 1944 the team started development of a larger version of the Derwent that was delivered as the 5,500 lbf (24,000 N) Nene. While this proved to be a successful design, it was not used widely on British aircraft, and Rolls eventually sold a licence to the United States, and later, several engines to the Soviet Union, which then went on to copy it unlicensed. This set off a major political row, and soon the MiG-15, powered by a Klimov VK-1 (a copy of the Nene), was outperforming anything America or Britain had to counter it.

Meanwhile, Hooker's team had moved onto their first axial-flow engine, which had been designed by A. A. Griffith at Derby and which was then known as the AJ.65 but which was soon to be renamed the Avon. This did not turn out well at first, and Hooker felt he was being blamed for its problems. At the same time Rolls decided that their existing piston engines were a dead end, and moved all future jet work from Barnoldswick to Derby, their main engine site. This reduced Hooker's role in the company, and after an emotional falling-out with Hives, he left.

== Bristol ==
In January 1949, Hooker went to work at the Bristol Aero Engine company. He immediately started work on sorting out the various problems of Bristol's turboprop design, the Proteus, which was intended to power a number of Bristol aircraft designs, including the Britannia. The task of rectifying the many faults of the Proteus was immense, but most were solved. However, a near-fatal accident with Britannia G-ALRX in February 1954, due to a spur gear failure, prompted a telephone call from his old boss Hives, who subsequently sent his top team of Rolls-Royce jet engineers, among them Elliott, Rubbra, Lovesey, Lombard, Haworth and Davies, to give Hooker some desperately needed help. Sadly, this was the last communication between the two great men.

The Proteus was soon in production, but did not see widespread use, as only a small number of Britannias were built. Hooker also worked on finishing the Olympus, developing later versions that would be used on the Avro Vulcan and Concorde and a further development for the stillborn TSR2.

In 1952, Hooker was asked by the Folland company whether he could produce a 5,000 lbf (22 kN) thrust engine to power their new lightweight fighter, the Gnat. For this role, he produced his first completely original design, the Orpheus, which went on to power the Fiat G.91 and other light fighters.

Hooker then used the Orpheus as the basis of an experimental vectored-thrust engine for STOVL aircraft, at that time considered by most to be the next big thing in aircraft design. In conjunction with Gordon Lewis (engineer), extensive studies showed that a suitable engine could be produced by using the Orpheus as the core of an unmixed turbofan, where the fan discharged compressed air through a pair of thrust vectoring nozzles near the front of the engine, whilst the exhaust gases discharged through a pair of thrust vectoring nozzles at the rear. The resulting engine was called the Pegasus, which led ultimately to the Hawker Siddeley Harrier attack aircraft.

In 1962, Hooker was made a Fellow of the Royal Society.

In the late 1950s, the Air Ministry forced through a series of mergers in the aerospace field that left only two airframe companies and two engine companies. Bristol was merged with Armstrong Siddeley to become Bristol Siddeley in 1958, while most other remaining engine companies merged with Rolls.

In 1966, Bristol Siddeley was itself bought by the now cash-flush Rolls, with the result that there was only one engine company in England.

After a brief period, Hooker retired in 1967, staying on as a consultant only. Hooker's eminence in the field was widely recognised and he was made an Honorary Fellow of the AIAA.

In 1970, he retired fully, and was upset that after almost 30 years in the industry, he had never become director of engine development.

== Return to Rolls-Royce ==
In February 1971, Rolls-Royce was driven into receivership by its hugely expensive RB.211 project. Just prior to the bankruptcy, at the end of 1970, Hugh Conway (group managing director, gas turbines) agreed that Hooker should come out of retirement to go to Derby to survey the situation, insisting Hooker be accorded the status of technical director at Derby. Hooker was made responsible for technical supervision of the four gas turbine divisions and was leading a Rolls-Royce effort to improve both power and fuel consumption of the engine. 'The situation came to a head in February 1971, just before we got the improved engine on test, when Lord Cole declared Rolls-Royce insolvent'.

Hooker was immediately appointed to the board of the new nationalised company, Rolls-Royce (1971) Ltd. As technical director, he provided the expertise, drive and energy to lead and inspire the team, including drawing in old colleagues (some long retired), to rectify the problems and soon the RB.211 was in production. Its first application was for Lockheed's L-1011 Tri-Star. Hooker and his revitalised team then went on to complete the design of the more advanced RB211-524 series. It was to be another two years before, under Sir Kenneth Keith, they were at last permitted to go ahead with its full development.

Hooker was knighted for his role in 1974. After another four years, he retired once again in 1978.

In 1975, he was awarded an Honorary Degree (Doctor of Science) by the University of Bath.

During his return to Rolls-Royce, Sir Stanley was part of several high-level trade missions to China. These led to his becoming Honorary Professor of Aeronautical Engineering at Beijing University.

The last year of Sir Stanley Hooker's life was a brave struggle against disease. He was determined to complete his autobiography, and in this, as in most of his enterprises, he was successful. With uncanny precision he managed to put off death until the day before the actual publication of the work. In 1984, therefore, his autobiography was published, entitled, Not Much of an Engineer, referring to a quip that Hives had made upon seeing his qualifications (Hooker was a mathematician by training) during Hooker's job interview.

In the late 1980s, test pilot Bill Bedford gave a talk in Christie's auction room in South Kensington in London. He had been the original test pilot for the Harrier at Dunsfold. Bedford talked about the various fighters he had flown, many of which had been powered by Hooker's engines. On the screen behind him, towards the end of his talk, he showed a picture of Hooker, and said, "I'll have to think about this a bit, but if I was asked who was Britain's greatest ever engineer, I'd have to decide between Brunel and Sir Stanley Hooker, but I'd probably go for Sir Stanley."

In a television series produced by Johnathan Lewis, Sir Kenneth Keith stated: 'I always thought that Stanley was a near-genius. He was very, very clever and a very good engineer. Very good engineers are very difficult to find. You don't get too many in a generation or in a country.'

== Personal life ==
He married Margaret Bradbury in 1937. On 22 February 1940 their daughter Jane Margaret Hooker was born. The Hon Margaret Bradbury (1911-1986) was daughter of the 1st Baron Bradbury, GCB (1872-1950), the economist.

They divorced in 1950 and later in 1950 he married Kate Maria Pope.

Towards the end of his life, Hooker lived at 'Orchard Hill' in Milbury Heath (off the A38).
