= Arthur Rubbra =

English aeronautical engineer and industrial designer

- Born: 29 October 1903; Northampton, England
- Died: 24 November 1982 (aged 79); Southport, Merseyside
- Education: Bristol University
- Spouse: Lilian Webster
- Engineering career
- Institutions: Armstrong Siddeley; Rolls-Royce Limited
- Projects: Rolls-Royce Merlin
- Significant advance: Aero engines
- Awards: CBE, awarded 1961; Royal Aeronautical Society Gold Medal, awarded 1969

Arthur Alexander Cecil Rubbra CBE (29 October 1903 – 24 November 1982) was an English engineer who designed many of Rolls-Royce's successful aero engines. He was "placed by many alongside Royce, Rowledge and Elliot as one of Rolls-Royce's greatest engineers...".

== Early life ==
Rubbra was born in Northampton on 29 October 1903 to Edmund and Mary Rubbra who ran a watch and jewellery repair business. It is thought that the rare family surname was a form of "Ruborough", the Somerset village near Broomfield where his ancestors came from. His elder brother, Charles Edmund, became a distinguished composer.

As a boy Rubbra was fascinated by steam engines and spent many hours at nearby Blisworth watching trains on the London–Crewe line. He was an accomplished artist and often sketched his favourite subjects. Rubbra attended Northampton Grammar School where he played rugby, and then Bristol University leaving in 1925 with a BSc in engineering.

== Career ==
Rubbra's first job was with Armstrong Siddeley although little is known of his time there. He obtained a grant from a fund originally set up by the organisers of the 1851 Great Exhibition, and secured a job as an assistant tester in the engine test houses of Rolls-Royce Limited at Derby on 13 July 1925. He was paid the sum of exactly £1 per week at that time. He worked on the Rolls-Royce Eagle XVI 16-cylinder X engine and the later Rolls-Royce Kestrel and Buzzard aero engines.

In October 1927, Rubbra (who had become known as 'Rbr' in company shorthand) was promoted to designer, where he was further involved with the Buzzard, Kestrel and the new Rolls-Royce R. He also became deeply involved in the Goshawk, Merlin and Vulture projects. In 1934 he was appointed assistant chief designer and in July 1940 he was promoted further to chief designer of aero engines.

His design work continued with development of the Merlin, and he was a major contributor to the success of the Rolls-Royce Griffon, the last of the V12 piston engine line. In 1943 Rubbra was designing the Eagle and then began work on the Welland, the company's first turbojet engine. In 1944 another promotion to assistant chief engineer saw him working on other emerging turbojet projects. By 1954 'Rbr' had risen to the position of technical director on the company board.

During his time at Rolls-Royce, Rubbra married his secretary, Lilian Webster, and in 1961 he was appointed a Commander of the Order of the British Empire (CBE), as was his brother Edmund who was a respected musical composer.

== Retirement ==
In 1966 Rubbra gave up his post as technical director for health reasons but continued to work as 'Chief Technical Advisor'. In October 1968 Arthur Rubbra retired from Rolls-Royce by which time he had become vice-chairman of the company. In 1969 he was awarded the Royal Aeronautical Society's highest honour, the Gold Medal for 'outstanding contributions over many years in the whole field of aircraft propulsion'. His services were required once more in 1971 when he was asked, along with Stanley Hooker, to assist with developmental problems pertaining to the Rolls-Royce RB211 civil turbofan project.

A. A. Rubbra died on 24 November 1982, aged 79. His brother died four years later in 1986. His memoirs, Rubbra (1990), formed the basis of an illustrated book published long after his death by the Rolls-Royce Heritage Trust.

== See also ==
- Edmund Rubbra (brother)

== Works ==
- Rubbra, A.A. (1990). Rolls-Royce Piston Aero Engines – a designer remembers. Rolls-Royce Heritage Trust. ISBN 1-872922-00-7. Historical Series N° 16.
