= Rolls-Royce Heritage Trust =

UK organization

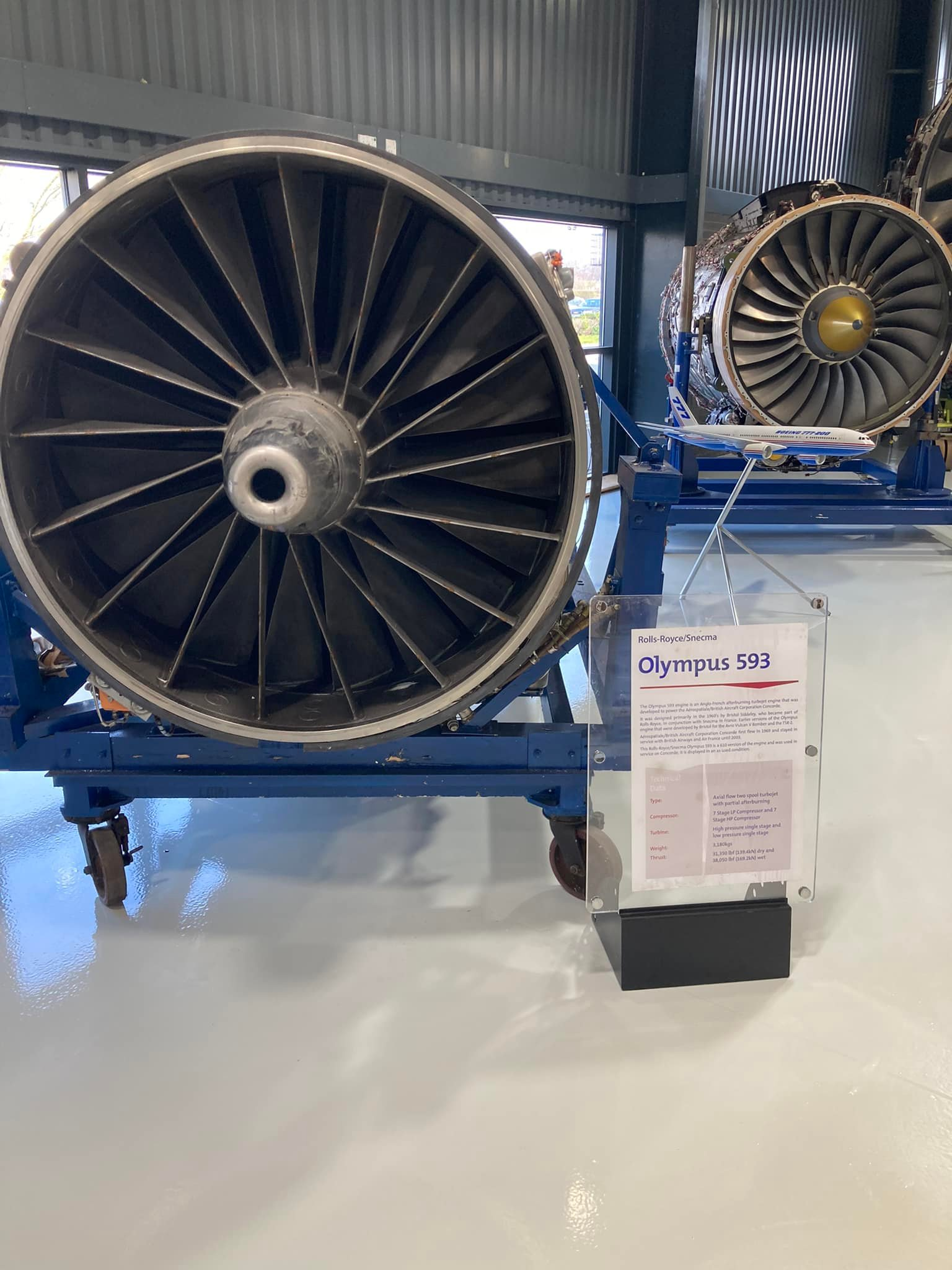
- An Olympus 593 and a BR710 at the Rolls-Royce Heritage Trust, Derby.
- Established: 1981
- Location: Derby, Derbyshire (Headquarters)
- Website: https://www.rolls-royce.com/about/heritage-trust.aspx

The Rolls-Royce Heritage Trust is an organisation that was founded in 1981 to preserve the history of Rolls-Royce Limited, Rolls-Royce Holdings and all merged or acquired companies. Five volunteer led branches exist, three in England, one in Scotland and a North American branch.

== Branches ==
=== Derby and Hucknall ===
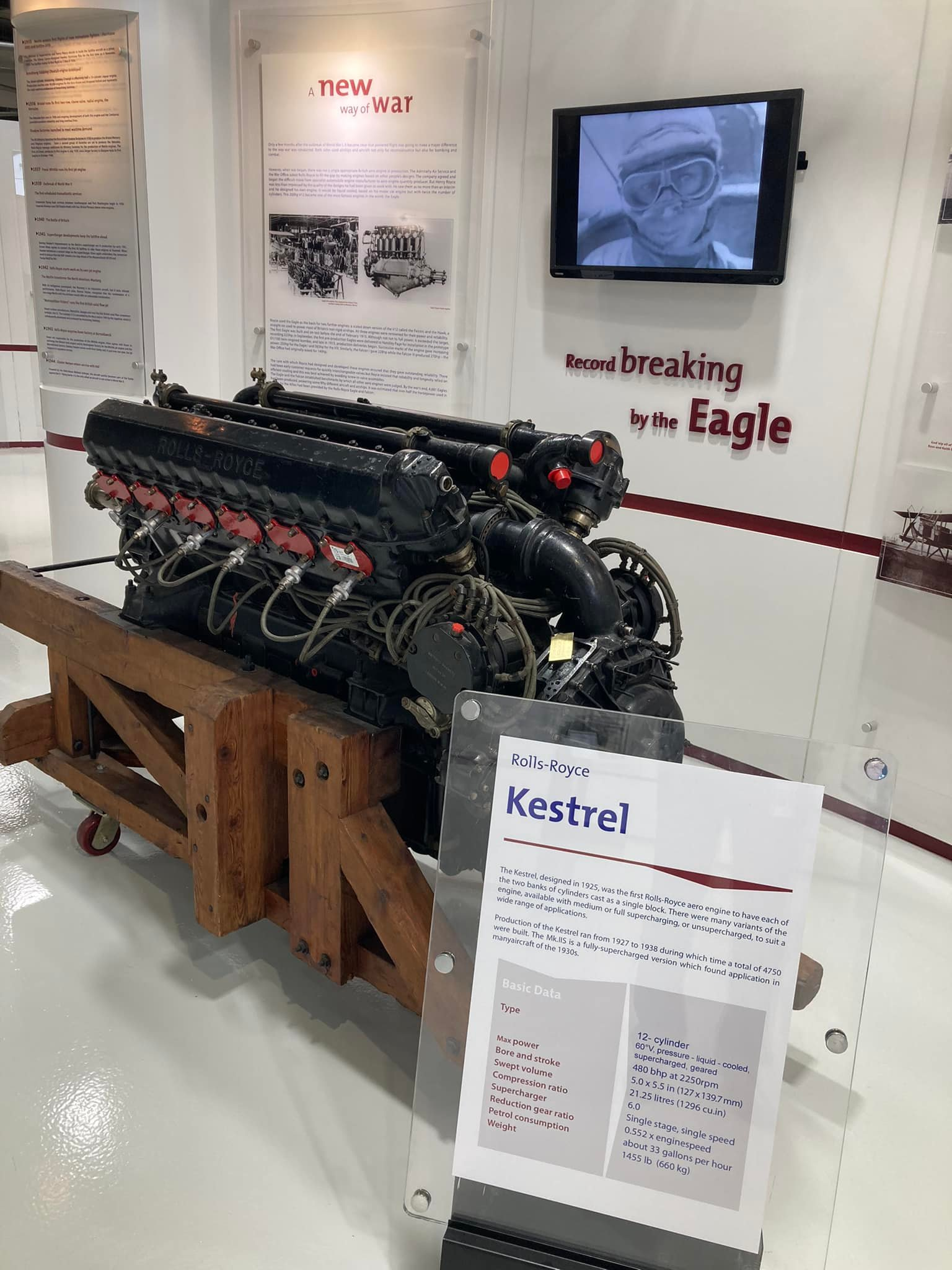
Typical display at the Derby Heritage Collection, a 1925 Rolls-Royce Kestrel. Early use of a supercharger in an aero engine. Uses integrated cylinder blocks and cylinder heads.

The collection is located within the Company campus at Sinfin. The site at Osmaston Road is now permanently closed.

A separate site with a smaller engine collection details the history of the Rolls-Royce Flight Test Establishment at Hucknall.

=== Coventry and Ansty ===
The Coventry and Ansty branch examples of Armstrong Siddeley rocket designs is kept at the Derby site.

=== Bristol ===
The Bristol branch engine collection is housed in the Sir Roy Fedden Heritage Centre. As well as Roy Fedden designed engines from the Bristol Aeroplane Company and products built by Bristol Siddeley a number of de Havilland and Blackburn types are displayed.

=== Scotland ===
The Scottish branch of the Rolls-Royce Heritage Trust is based in the village of Inchinnan, Renfrewshire and has a collection of engines that were produced at the Hillington and East Kilbride factories.

=== Indianapolis ===
The Indianapolis branch of the trust chronicles the history of the Allison Engine Company which was acquired by Rolls-Royce in 1995 as well as later and current products of Rolls-Royce North America.

== Publications ==
The Rolls-Royce Heritage Trust publishes a range of books and other media specialising in aero engine subjects and other products, company personnel and history topics.

Twice a year, members receive a publication - The Journal.

== See also ==
- Rolls-Royce aircraft piston engines

Related lists

- List of aerospace museums
