= Rolls-Royce Limited =

1906–1987 UK automobile and aerospace manufacturer

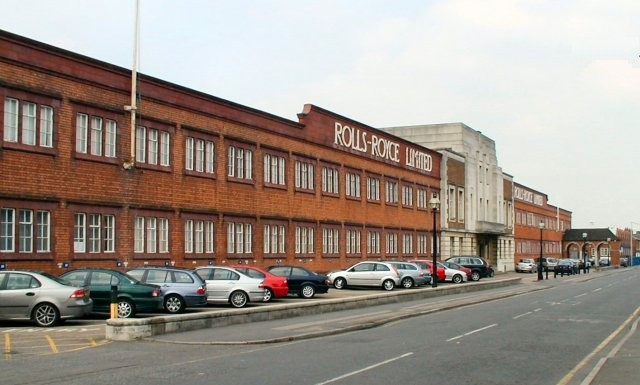
- Formerly: 'Rolls-Royce Limited' (1906–71); 'Rolls-Royce (1971) Limited' (1971–77); 'Rolls-Royce Limited' (1977–86); 'Rolls-Royce plc' (1986)
- Type: 1906: private limited company; 1907: public limited company; 1971: state-owned company; as 'Rolls-Royce (1971) Limited'; (re-named in 1977 to' Rolls-Royce Limited', then re-named in 1986 to 'Rolls-Royce plc')
- Industry: Automotive; Manufacturing
- Predecessor: Partnership of Rolls and Royce (1904–1906)
- Founded: Manchester, United Kingdom; 1906 (as a private company); 1971 (as a state-owned company)
- Founders: Charles Rolls; Henry Royce
- Defunct: April 1987
- Fate: 1971: voluntary receivership; (most assets were bought by the British government); State-owned company until: Motors sold to Vickers (1980); Aerospace sold to the public as Rolls-Royce plc (1987)
- Successors: Automotive: Rolls-Royce Motors; Aerospace: Rolls-Royce Holdings
- Headquarters: Derby, United Kingdom
- Key people: Claude Johnson; Ernest Hives; Adrian Lombard
- Products: Automobiles; Civil and military aero-engines; Marine propulsion systems; Power generation equipment
- Subsidiaries: Significant subsidiaries; 1931: Bentley Motors; 1939: Park Ward; 1959: H. J. Mulliner & Co.; 1961: Mulliner Park Ward; 1966: Bristol Aircraft Holdings; –Bristol Aeroplane Company; –Bristol Siddeley Engines; 1973: Rolls-Royce Motors

Rolls-Royce Limited is a British luxury car and later an aero-engine manufacturing business established in 1904 in Manchester by the partnership of Charles Rolls and Henry Royce. Building on Royce's good reputation established with his cranes, they quickly developed a reputation for superior engineering by manufacturing luxury cars. The business was incorporated as "Rolls-Royce Limited" in 1906, and a new factory in Derby was opened in 1908. The First World War brought the company into manufacturing aero-engines. Joint development of jet engines began in 1940, and they entered production in 1944.

In the late 1960s, Rolls-Royce was adversely affected by the mismanaged development of its advanced RB211 jet engine and consequent cost overruns, though it ultimately proved a great success. In 1971, the owners were obliged to liquidate their business. The useful portions were bought by a new government-owned company named "Rolls-Royce (1971) Limited", which continued the core business but sold the holdings in British Aircraft Corporation (BAC) almost immediately and transferred ownership of the profitable but now financially insignificant car division to Rolls-Royce Motors Holdings Limited, which it sold to Vickers in 1980. Rolls-Royce obtained consent to drop the '1971' distinction from its company name in 1977, at which point it became known once again as "Rolls-Royce Limited".

The Rolls-Royce business remained nationalised until 1987 when, after having renamed the company to "Rolls-Royce plc", the British government sold it to the public in a share offering. Rolls-Royce plc still owns and operates Rolls-Royce's principal business, although, since 2003, it is technically a subsidiary of Rolls-Royce Holdings plc, a listed holding company.

== Motor cars ==
Henry Royce started an electrical and mechanical business in Manchester in 1884. He was first introduced to motor cars via a small De Dion-Bouton four-wheeler that had been purchased for him by business partner Ernest Claremont. In 1902 or 1903 he purchased a 1901 model two cylinder 10 hp Decauville. While Decauville had an excellent reputation at the time Royce with his fascination for all things mechanical found many things that did not meet his high standards and so he began making improvements. At the time his company was suffering from the effects of a decline in trade due to a downturn in the economy and competition from other manufacturers which had depressed prices. To investigate whether the company should diversify into the manufacture of motor cars Royce produced three examples of his own 10 hp experimental design.

Testing of the first engine on a dynamometer began on 16 September 1903. The first assembled car was completed by 1 April 1904 and taken by Royce for a 30 miles (48 km) drive to his home in Knutsford and back. A week later it was dispatched to coachbuilder to have a body fitted. The other two cars were completed and fitted with bodies soon after. After initially being assigned the first car Claremont was given the second car to use. Initially he often had a horse drawn Hanson cab follow behind in case the car failed to proceed. The third car was sold to one of the other company fellow directors, Henry Edmunds. Edmunds was a friend of Charles Rolls who was proprietor of an early motor car dealership, C.S. Rolls & Co. in Fulham selling imported models. Edmunds showed Rolls his car and arranged for a meeting between Rolls and Royce at the newly opened Midland Hotel, Manchester, on 4 May 1904.

In spite of his preference for three- or four-cylinder cars, Rolls was impressed with the Royce 10, and in a subsequent agreement on 23 December 1904 agreed to take all the cars Royce could make. There would be four models:

- a 10 hp (7.5 kW), two-cylinder model selling at £395, about £30,000 in 2021,
- a 15 hp (11 kW) three-cylinder model selling at £500, about £40,000 in 2021,
- a 20 hp (15 kW) four-cylinder model selling at £650, about £60,000 in 2021,
- a 30 hp (22 kW) six-cylinder model selling at £890, about £80,000 in 2021,

All would be badged as Rolls-Royces and be sold exclusively by Rolls in framed chassis form for the customer to arrange his own body supplier, with London coachbuilder Barker & Co. recommended. From its establishment Rolls-Royce did not produce complete cars until the introduction of the Silver Dawn in 1949. Instead, they produced a framed chassis with engine, gearbox and transmission, to which a body was fitted by a variety of coachbuilding companies, including Barker & Co., Hooper, H. J. Mulliner & Co., Park Ward and James Young.

The first Rolls-Royce cars, the 10 hp, 15 hp, 20 hp as well as the engine for the 30 hp were unveiled at the Paris Salon in December 1904. As the new three-cylinder 15 hp engine was not ready the chassis was incomplete. The 10 hp was similar to the earlier Royce car, but with further design and mechanical improvements.

In 1905 Royce designed a V-8 but only three were produced, of which one was sold before later being taken back by the company.

=== Incorporation ===
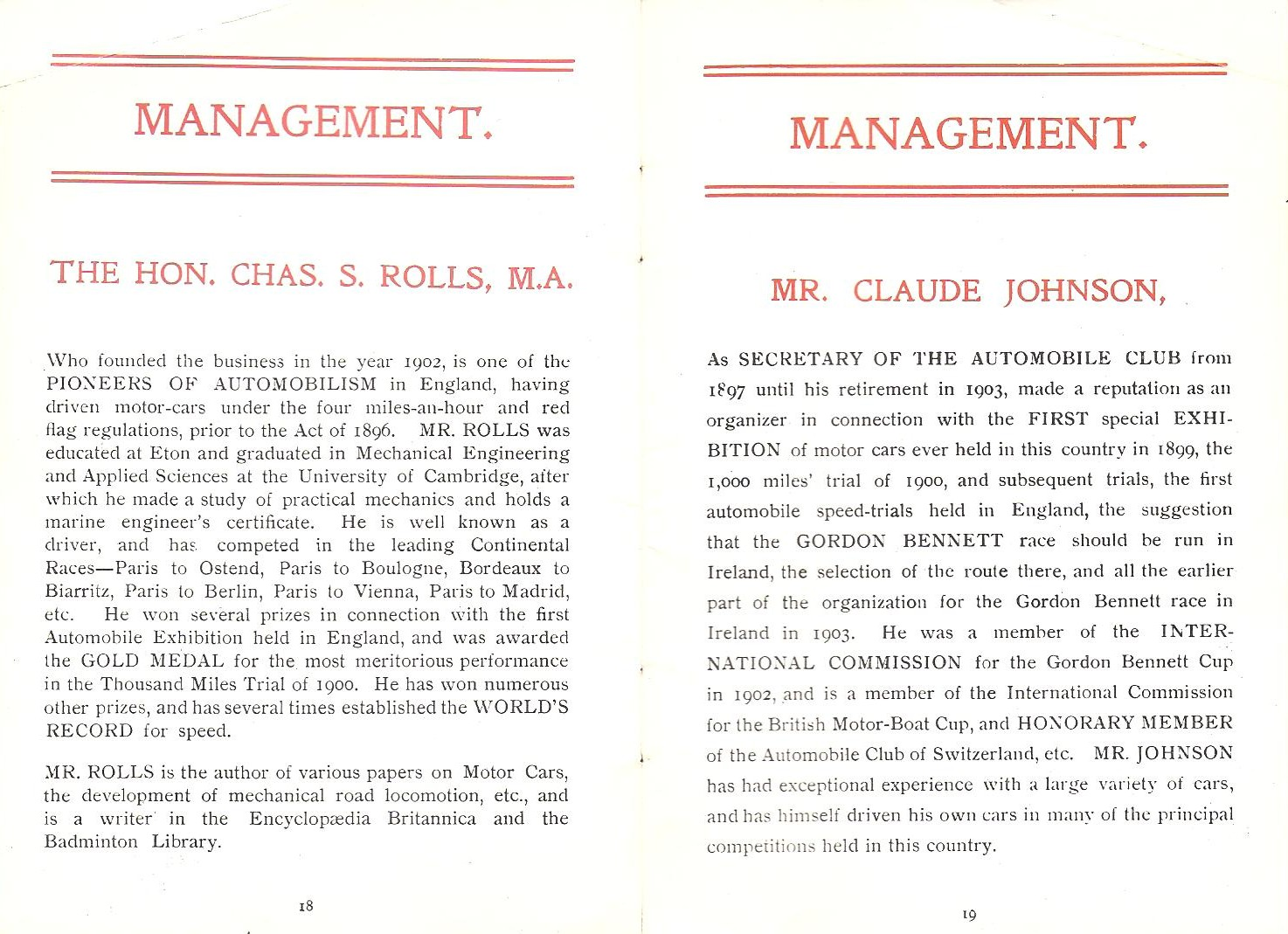
Pages from a very early brochure, c. 1906

In 1906 Rolls and Royce formalised their partnership by creating Rolls-Royce Limited, which was registered on 15 March 1906 with capital of £60,000 with Royce appointed chief engineer and works director on a salary of £1,250 per annum plus 4% of the profits in excess of £10,000. Claude Johnson who had joined the company as Commercial Managing Director and Rolls both received £750 per annum and 4% of the profits. While the salary was less than the £1,000 Johnson had been receiving at the Automobile Club, he had a greater potential to earn more due to his profit share.

To increase the company's capital to £200,000 it was floated on the Birmingham Stock Exchange on 11 December 1906 with £100,000 of shares made available to the public to acquire the business of C.S. Rolls & Co. However, by the day before the flotation it was apparent that only £41,000 of the required minimum subscription of £50,000 shared had been subscribed to. Of these Royce had purchased £10,000. The issue was resolved by company secretary John De Looze rushing from Manchester to Harrodgate to see wealthy businessman Arthur Harry Briggs, who had purchased the first "Light Twenty" car. Briggs agreed to purchase £10,000 worth of shares and in return was given a seat on the board. On 9 January 1907 it was announced that £63,000 had been raised.

The original directors were Arthur Harry Briggs. Ernest Claremont, Claude Johnson, C. S. Rolls and F. H. Royce. In 1907 Johnson recruited Lord Herbert Scott as a director, as he believed that having an aristocrat on the board would make its cars more appealing to the wealthy.

The need to increase the company's capital had been mainly driven by the need for bigger premises if they were to increase production. After considering sites in Manchester, Coventry, Bradford and Leicester, it was an offer from Derby's council of cheap electricity that resulted in the decision to acquire a 12.7 acres (51,000 m^{2}) site on the southern edge of that city. The new factory was largely designed by Royce, and production began in early 1908, with a formal opening on 9 July 1908 by Sir John Montagu.

=== Rolls-Royce 40/50 ===
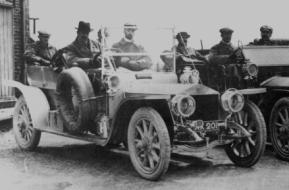
The Silver Ghost, (Note: The Silver Ghost – This car was ordered with its Barker body painted silver, specifically to publicize their new 40/50 hp model, which ran "with extraordinary stealthiness". Its name "The Silver Ghost" was carried on a special repoussé plaque on its dashboard. It was finished with green leather, silver-plated fittings, aluminium dashboard) 40/50 chassis #60551 registration AX-201 Scottish Reliability Trial 22 June 1907

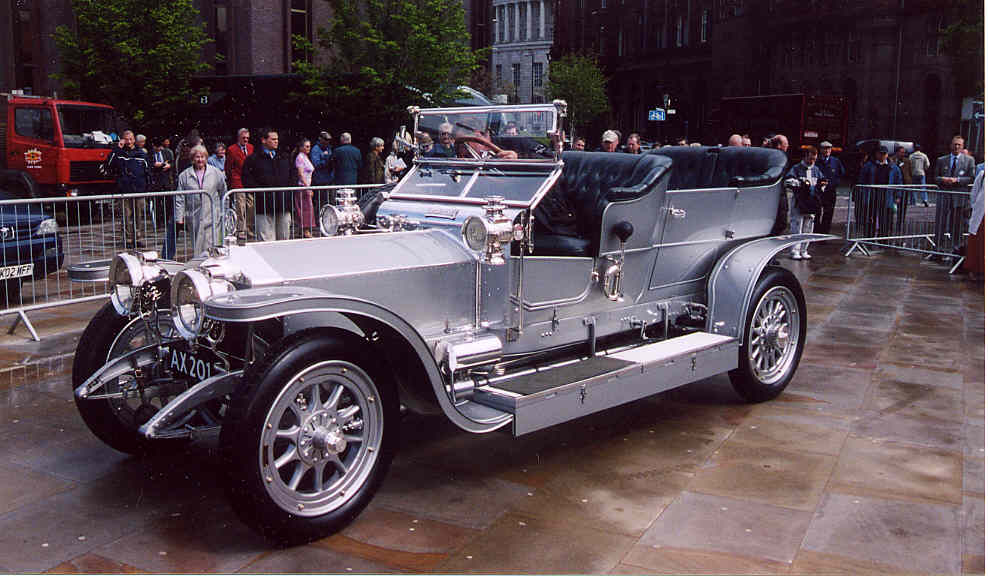
Original Silver Ghost car in 2004 — 40/50 chassis #60551 with semi-Roi-des-Belges open tourer body by Barker

During 1906 Royce had been developing an improved six-cylinder model with more power than the Rolls-Royce 30 hp. Initially designated the 40/50 hp, this was Rolls-Royce's first all-new model. In March 1908, Claude Johnson, Commercial Managing Director and sometimes described as the hyphen in Rolls-Royce, succeeded in persuading Royce and the other directors that Rolls-Royce should concentrate exclusively on the new model, and all the earlier models were duly discontinued. Johnson had an early example finished in silver and named, as if it were a yacht, Silver Ghost. Unofficially the press and public immediately picked up and used Silver Ghost for all the 40/50 cars made until the introduction of the 40/50 Phantom in 1925.

The new 40/50 was responsible for Rolls-Royce's early reputation with over 6,000 built. Its chassis was used as a basis for the first British armoured car used in both world wars.

Along with Geoffrey Rowe, Edward Goulding became a board member in 1911. He was appointed chairman in 1921 and remained in that position until he retired in 1936 and was succeeded by Lord Herbert Scott, who had recently retired from military service, which allowed to accept the position, which he occupied until his death in 1944.

=== Rolls-Royce Eagle aero-engine ===
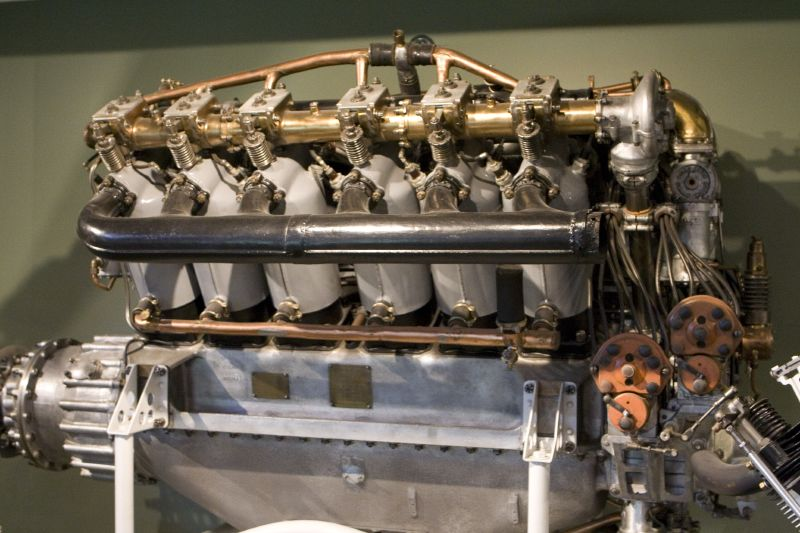
An Eagle VIII WWI era aero-engine

Aero-engine manufacturing began in 1914 at the government's request. The first model, the Rolls-Royce Eagle, entered production in 1915. Two Eagles powered Alcock and Brown's first non-stop trans-Atlantic crossing by aeroplane mounted on their converted Vickers Vimy bomber.

=== Springfield USA ===
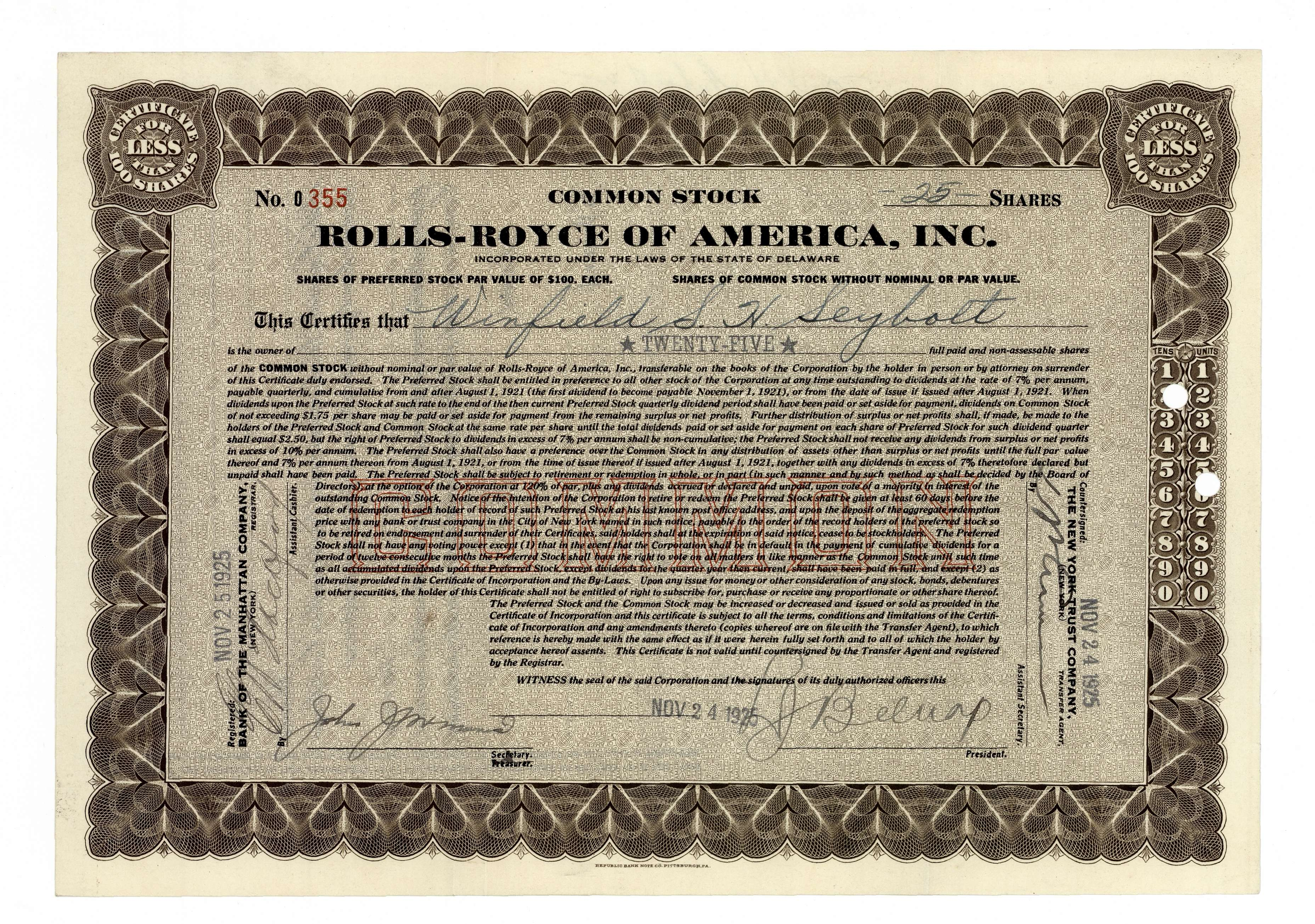
Share of the Rolls-Royce of America, Inc., issued 24 November 1925

In 1921, Rolls-Royce opened a new factory in Springfield, Massachusetts in the United States to help meet a three-year backlog demand where a further 1,703 "Springfield Ghosts" and 1,241 Phantoms were built. This factory was run by subsidiary Rolls-Royce of America, Inc., and operated for 10 years, with the first car being completed on January 17, 1921, that being a Silver Ghost with a documented chassis price of US$11,750 ($212,092 in 2025 dollars). When the factory closed in 1931, 2,944 total vehicles had been produced. It was located at the former American Wire Wheel factory on Hendee Street, with the administration offices at 54 Waltham Ave. Springfield was the earlier location for the Duryea Motor Wagon Company, the location where the first American gasoline-powered vehicle was built. Bodies for American assembly were supplied by Brewster & Co. in Long Island City, New York.

=== Rolls-Royce Twenty ===
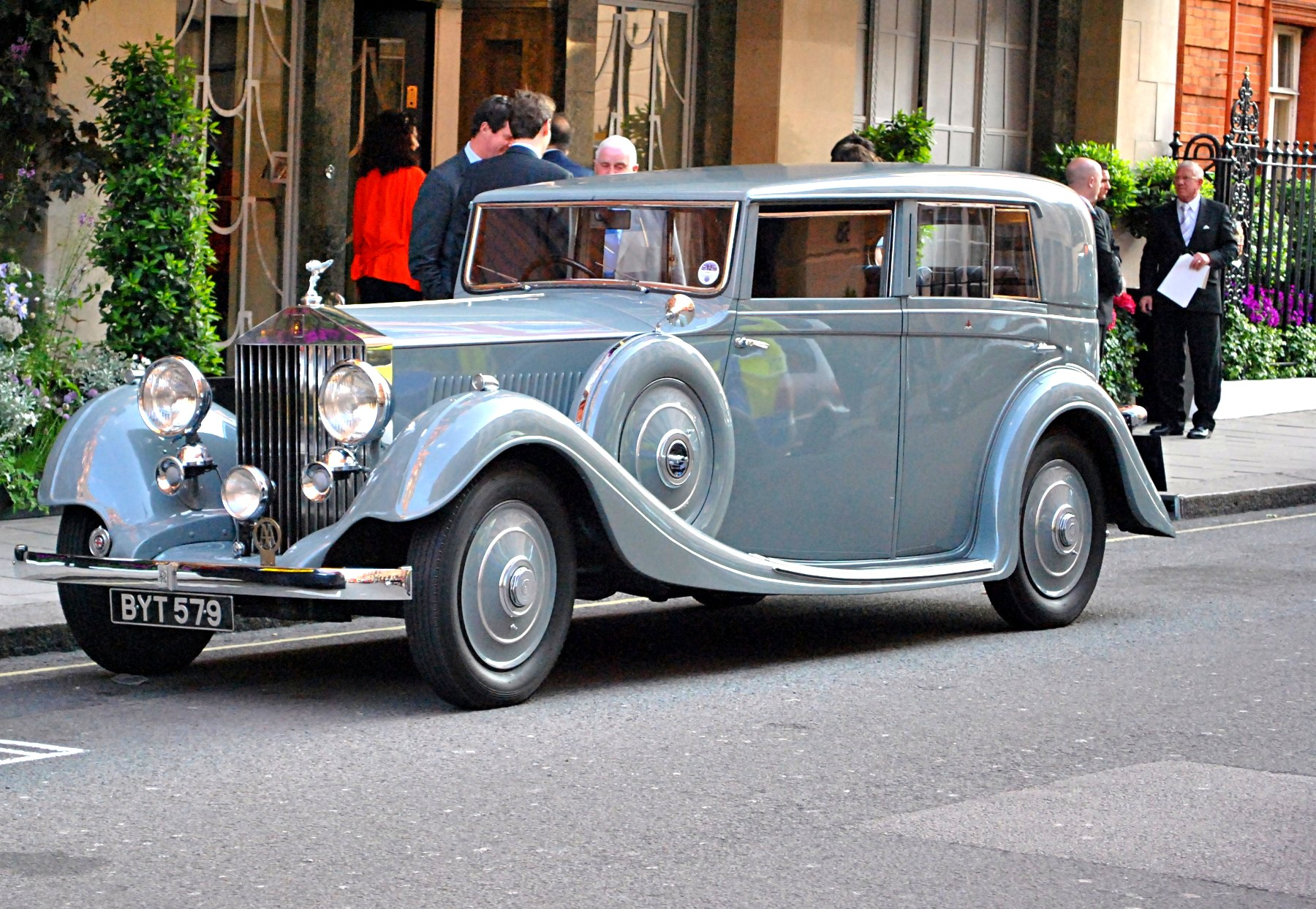
20/25 limousine by Gurney Nutting

After the First World War, Rolls-Royce successfully avoided attempts to encourage British car manufacturers to merge. Faced with falling sales of the 40/50 Silver Ghost in short-lived but deep postwar slumps Rolls-Royce introduced the smaller, affordable Twenty in 1922, effectively ending the one-model policy followed since 1908.

=== Death of Claude Johnson ===
Claude Johnson died on 12 April 1926 and was replaced as managing director by his brother Basil.

Basil Johnson resigned as managing director, on 31 January 1929 and was replaced as managing director by existing general manager Arthur Sidgreaves, who was also made director. At the same time general works manager Arthur Wormald, was also made a director. W. M. Cowan, who was London general manager, has become general manager of the company. Len W. Cox, who has been with the company since 1905, was appointed sales manager.

=== Rolls-Royce Phantom ===
The new 40/50 hp Phantom replaced the Silver Ghost in 1925. The Phantom III, introduced in 1936, was the last large pre-war model. A strictly limited production of Phantoms for heads of state recommenced in 1950 and continued until the Phantom VI ended production in the late 1980s.

=== Bentley and Rolls-Royce ===
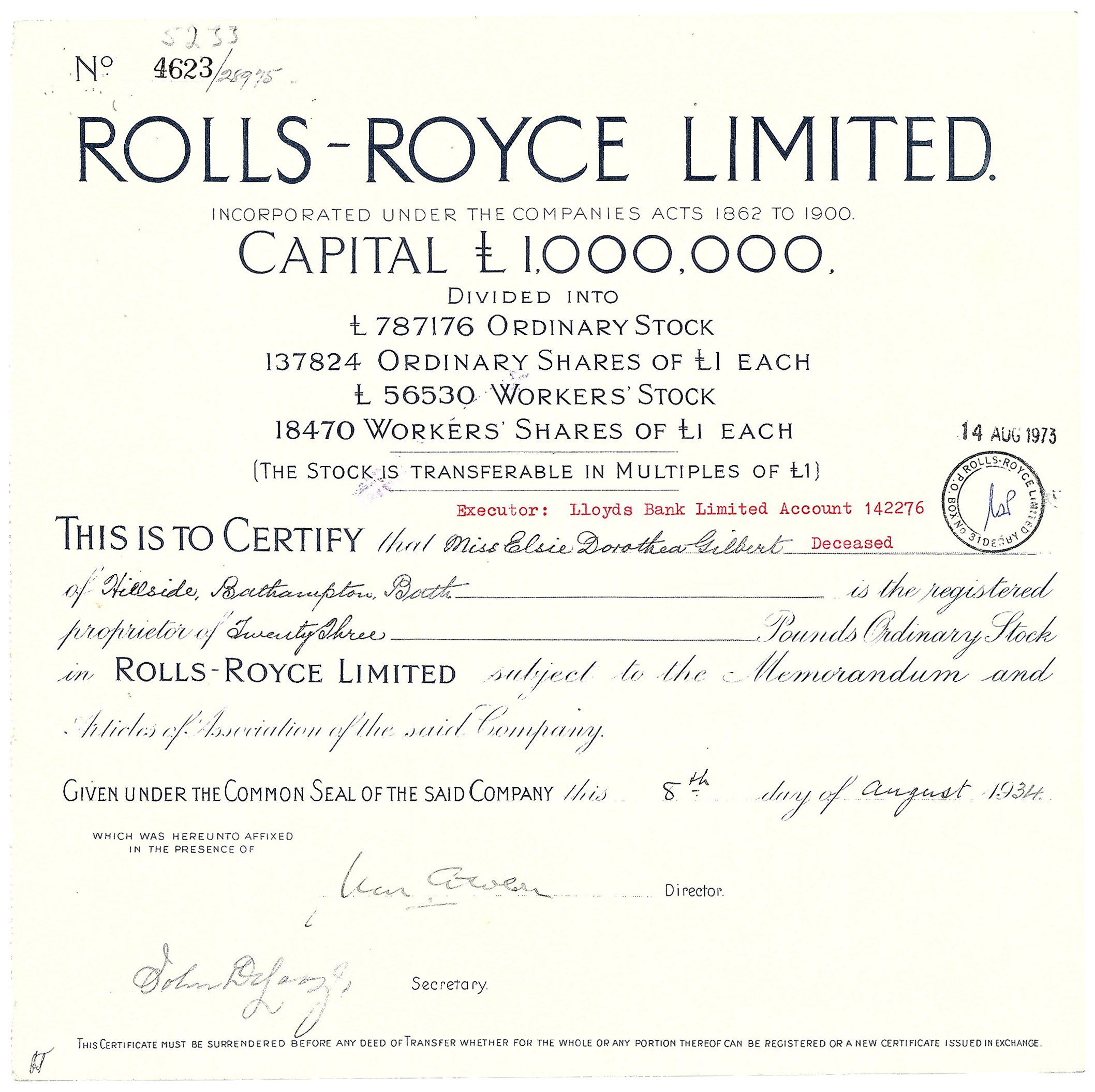
Certificate of the Rolls-Royce Limited for £23 of the Ordinary Stock, issued 8 August 1934. The stock certificate comes from the capital increase in November 1918 from £200,000 to £1,000,000. By far the oldest known British Rolls-Royce stock certificate

In 1931, Rolls-Royce acquired Bentley, the small sports/racing car maker and potential rival, after the latter's finances failed to weather the onset of the Great Depression. Rolls-Royce stopped production of the new Bentley 8 Litre, which was threatening sales of their current Phantom, disposed of remaining Bentley assets and using just the Bentley name and its repute.

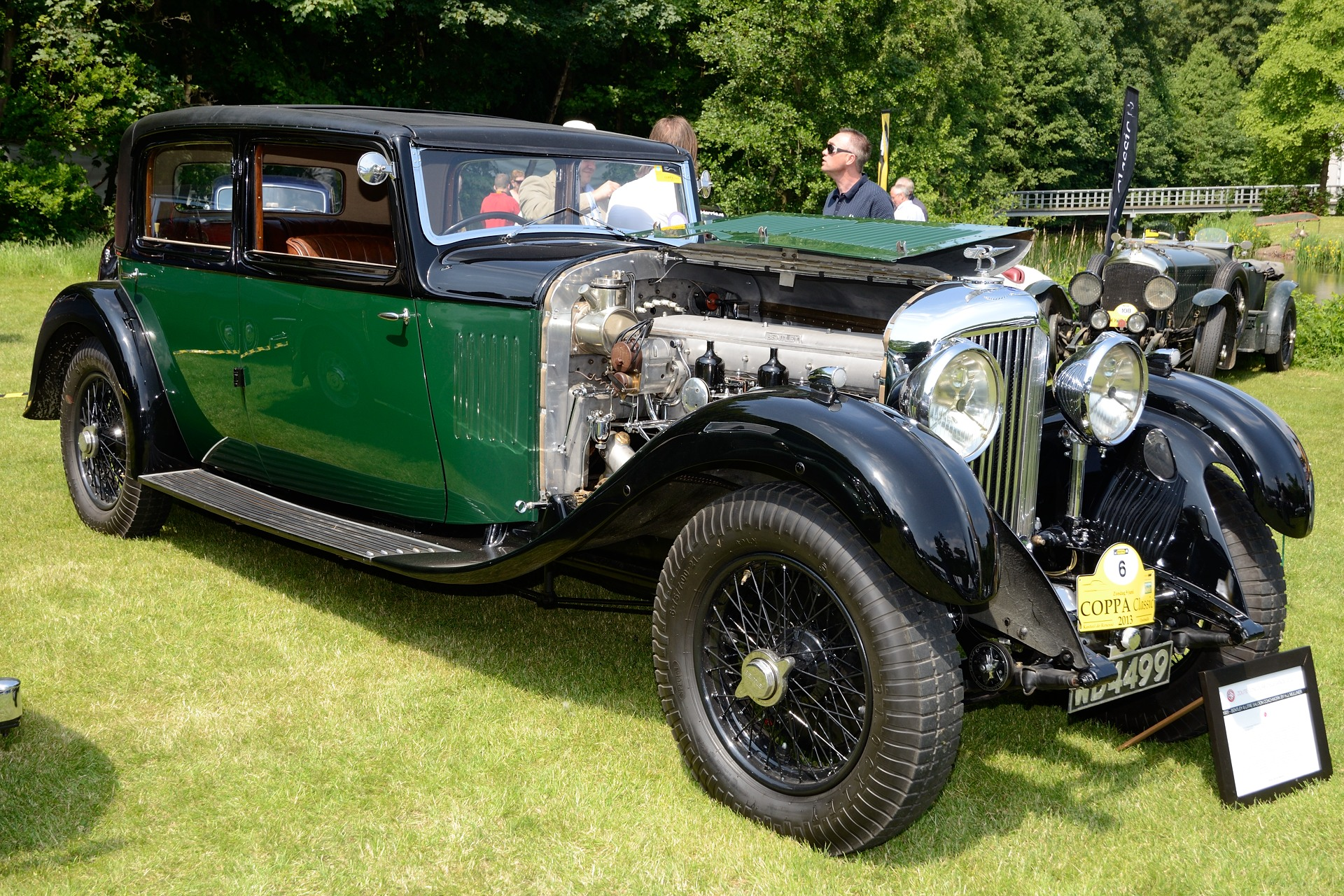
After 1931, Rolls-Royce stopped production of the Bentley 8 Litre, a competitor of the Phantom

After two years of development Rolls-Royce introduced a new and quite different ultra-civilised medium-size Bentley, the Bentley 3½ Litre. Advertised as "the silent sports car" and very much in the Rolls-Royce mould, it was a private entry by Eddie Hall (but supported by Rolls-Royce) in the 1934, 1935 and 1936 RAC Tourist Trophy sports car races on the Ards Circuit, where it recorded the fastest average speed in each year (ahead of Lagondas and Bugattis). This helped the Sales Department as old Bentley customers had been inclined to doubt that the new Crewe Bentley could out-perform its famous predecessors.

Immediately after World War II (when fully tooled pressed-steel cars were produced in the factory, rather than chassis sent to a coachbuilder for a custom-built body) until 2002, standard Bentley and Rolls-Royce cars were usually nearly identical – Bentleys were badge engineered; only the radiator grille and minor details differed.

In 1933, the colour of the Rolls-Royce radiator monogram was changed from red to black; because the red sometimes clashed with the coachwork colour selected by clients, and not as a mark of respect for the death of Royce later that year as is commonly stated.

=== Crewe ===
The British government built a shadow factory in Crewe in 1938 for Rolls-Royce where they could build their Merlin and Griffon aero engines. Car production was moved there in 1946 for space to construct bodies and to leave space for aero engines at Derby. The site was bought from the government in 1973. It is now Bentley Crewe.

=== Second World War ===
In 1940, a contract was signed with the Packard Motor Car Company in Detroit, Michigan, for the production of Merlin aero-engines for World War II in the USA.

Production focused on aero engines but a variant of the Merlin engine, known as the Meteor, was developed for the Cromwell tank. The Meteor's development completed in 1943 the same team at the Belper foundry restarted work on an eight-cylinder car engine widening its uses and it became the pattern for the British Army's B range of petrol engines for post war combat vehicles in particular in Alvis's FV600 range, (Note: Ritual Stolly swimming, "the best bit of kit we ever had") Daimler's Ferret, Humber's Hornet and Pig and Austin's Champ.

== Postwar diversification ==
=== Motor bodies ===
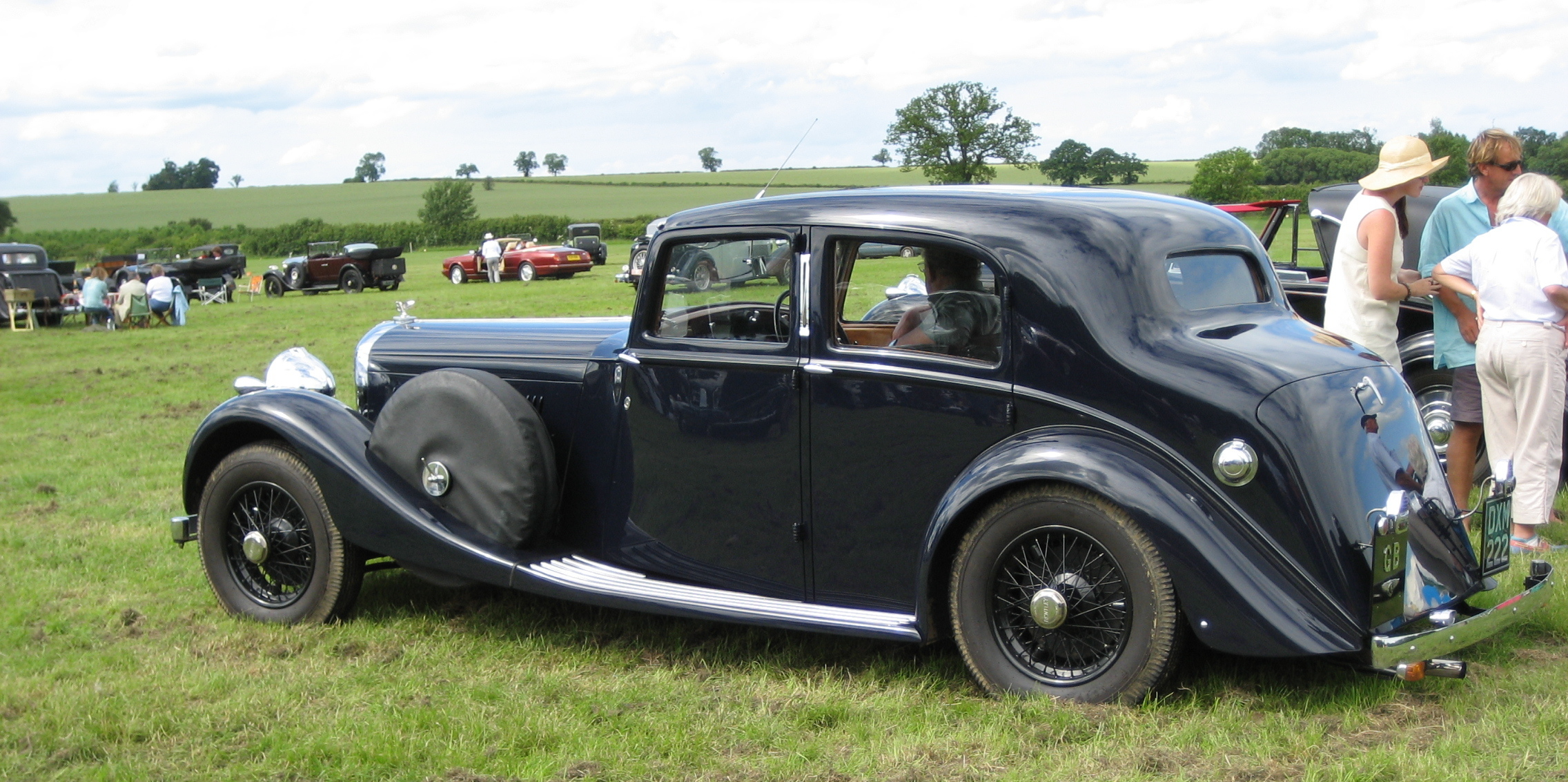
1937 Bentley with an all-metal body engineered by Rolls-Royce built by Park Ward

After the war, in 1946, Rolls-Royce and Bentley car production moved to Crewe where they began to assemble complete Rolls-Royce and Bentley cars with body pressings made by the Pressed Steel Company (see W. A. Robotham). Previously they had built only the chassis, leaving the bodies to specialist coach-builders. In 1939, Rolls-Royce brought one of the specialist coachbuilders completely in-house by buying the remaining capital of Park Ward Limited which, since 1936, in conjunction with Rolls-Royce had been building short production runs of all-metal saloon bodies on Bentley chassis.

In 1959, Rolls-Royce bought coachbuilder H J Mulliner and the two businesses were put together as H J Mulliner Park Ward.

=== Diesel engines Shrewsbury ===
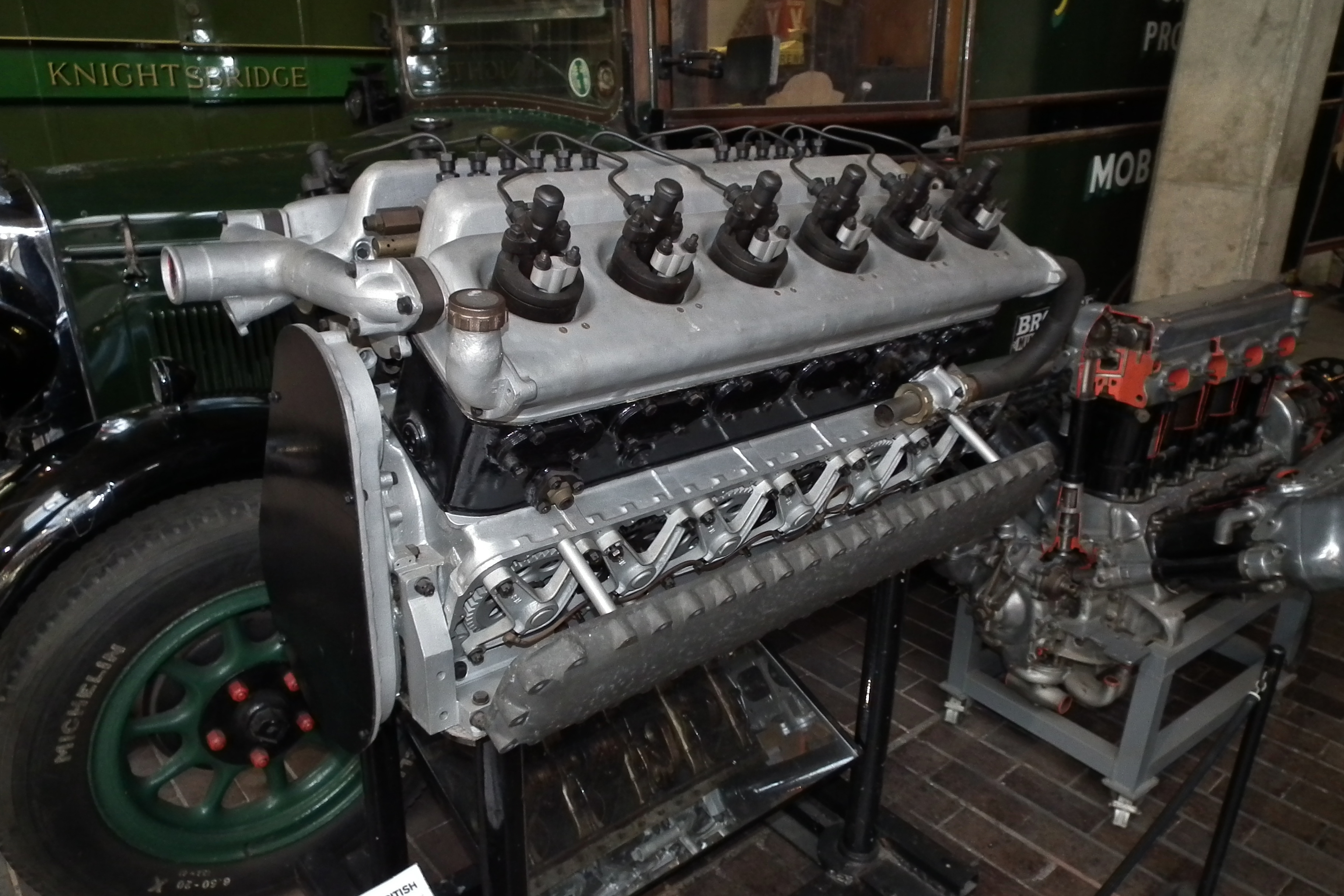
Experimental V12 sleeve-valve diesel engine designed for Rolls-Royce by Harry Ricardo 1930. In a car driven by George Eyston it held the diesel land speed record until 1950.

Luxury cars did not fit with the new mood of post-war austerity. After starting design and development of what became their C series diesel engine range in 1948, Rolls-Royce began to produce diesel engines in 1951. By 1955, it provided diesel engines for automotive, railway, industrial, earth-moving and marine use.

Sentinel (Shrewsbury) Limited was bought in 1956. Sentinel made machine tools and industrial locomotives. Rolls-Royce took over Sentinel's Shrewsbury factory for diesel engine production and all its diesel work was transferred there.

West Riding manufacturer of diesel shunting locomotives, Thomas Hill (Rotherham) Limited, was added to the group in 1963.

In 1973, when Shrewsbury activities were put under the umbrella of new owner, Rolls-Royce Motors, the range of diesel engines included:

- C range: 4, 6, and 8 cylinder engines with power output from 100 to 450 bhp. Used in generating sets, compressors etc., construction equipment, railway and other industrial purposes and marine propulsion.
- Eagle: a modified version of the C range 6-cylinder engine named Eagle is used in heavy vehicles, their output 200 to 300 bhp.
- D range: V engines with outputs from 400 to 750 bhp for generating sets, marine and railway applications.

== Aero-engines ==
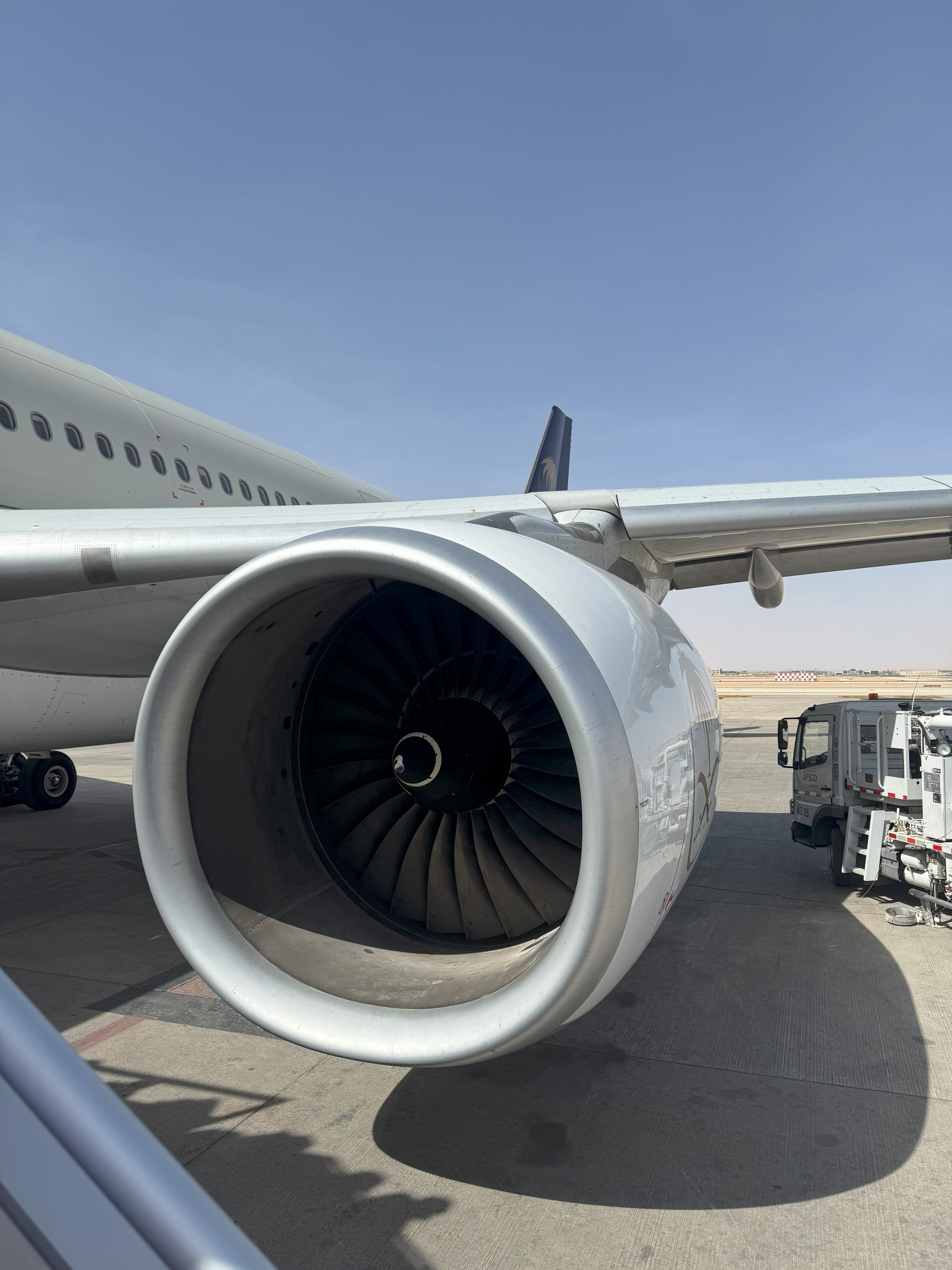
Rolls Royce Engine in a Saudia plane

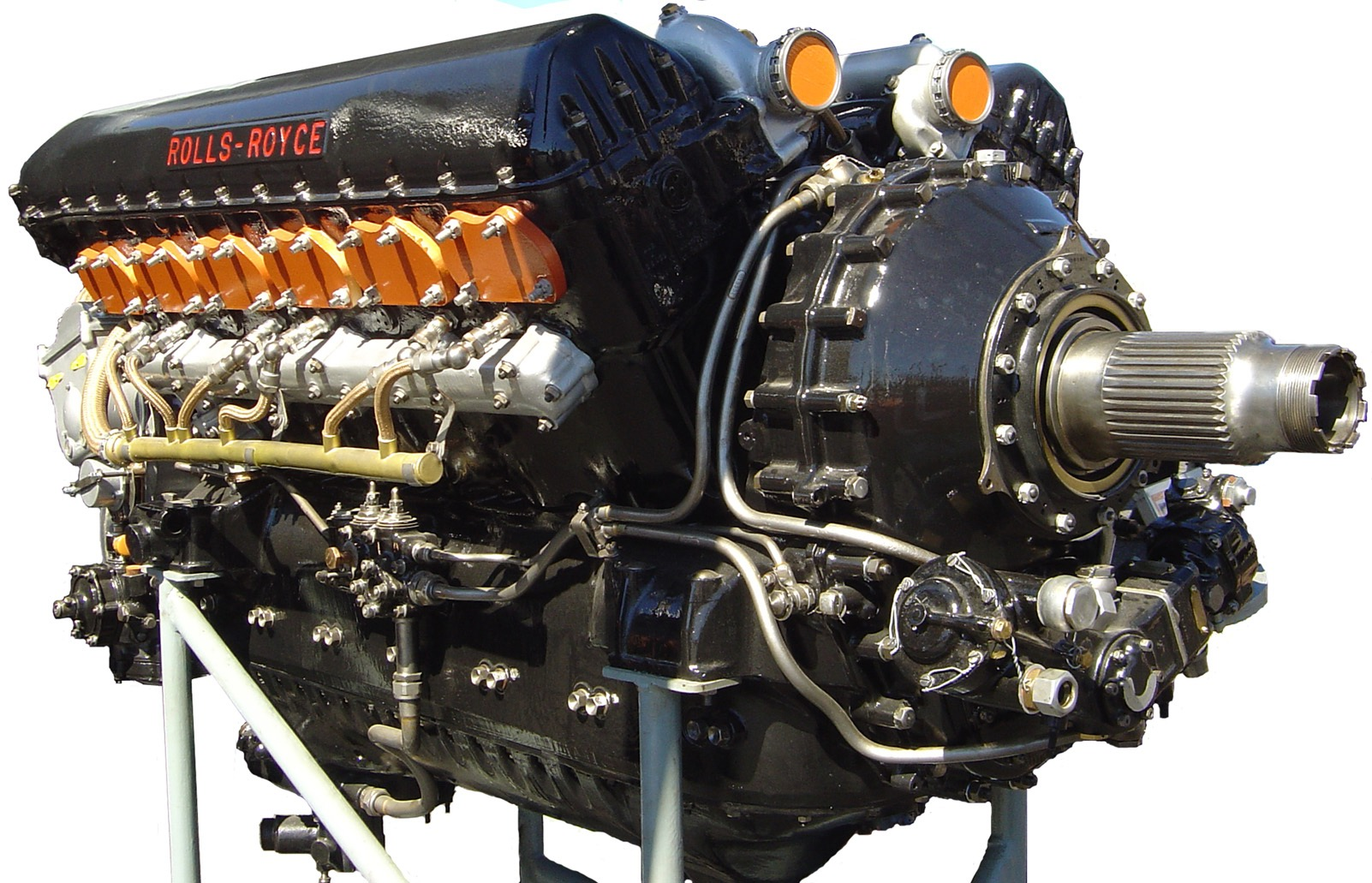
The ubiquitous 27-litre capacity Merlin

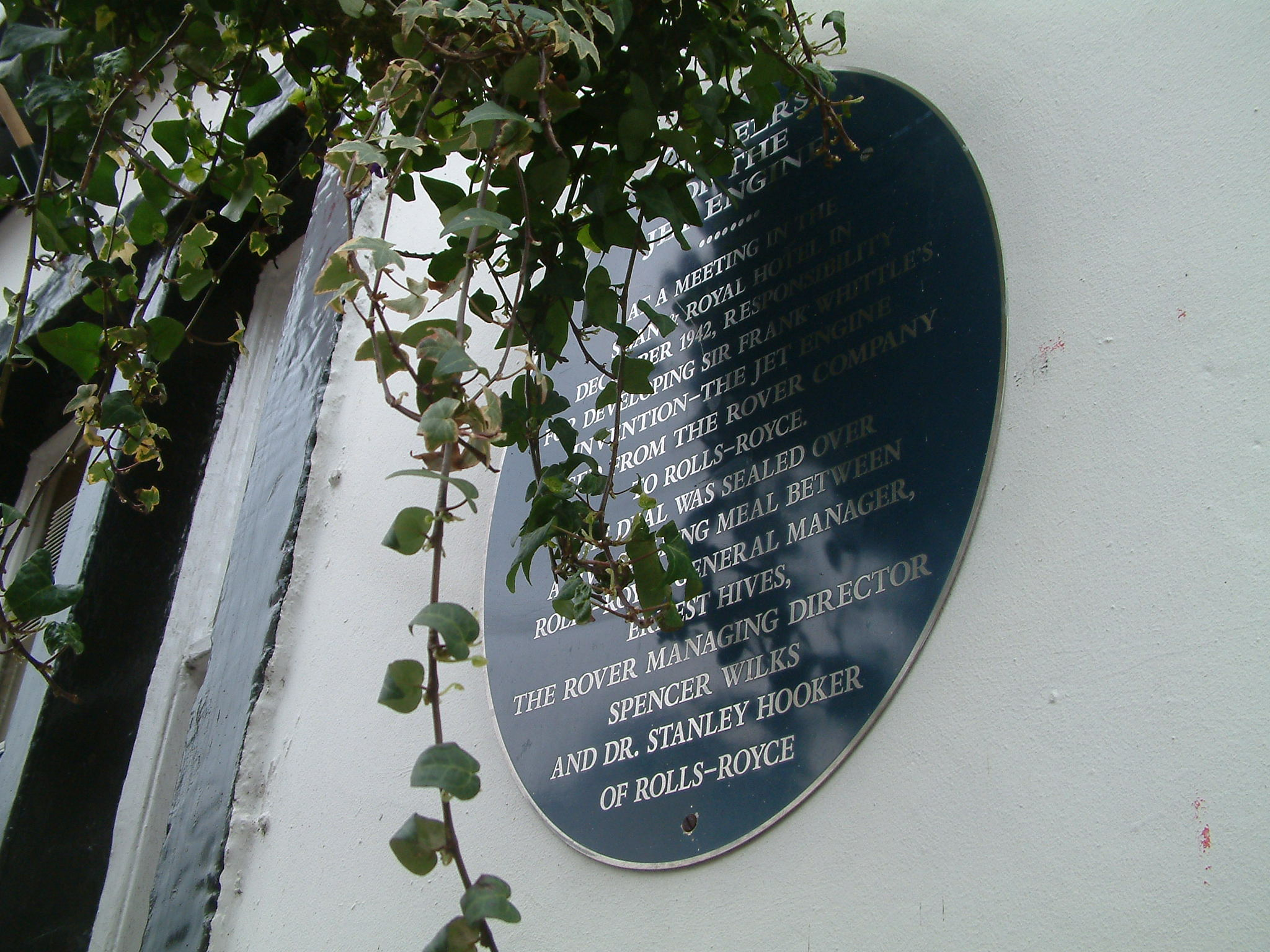
The plaque commemorating the location of the agreement that Rolls-Royce would take over top secret work on the development of the jet engine in WWII.

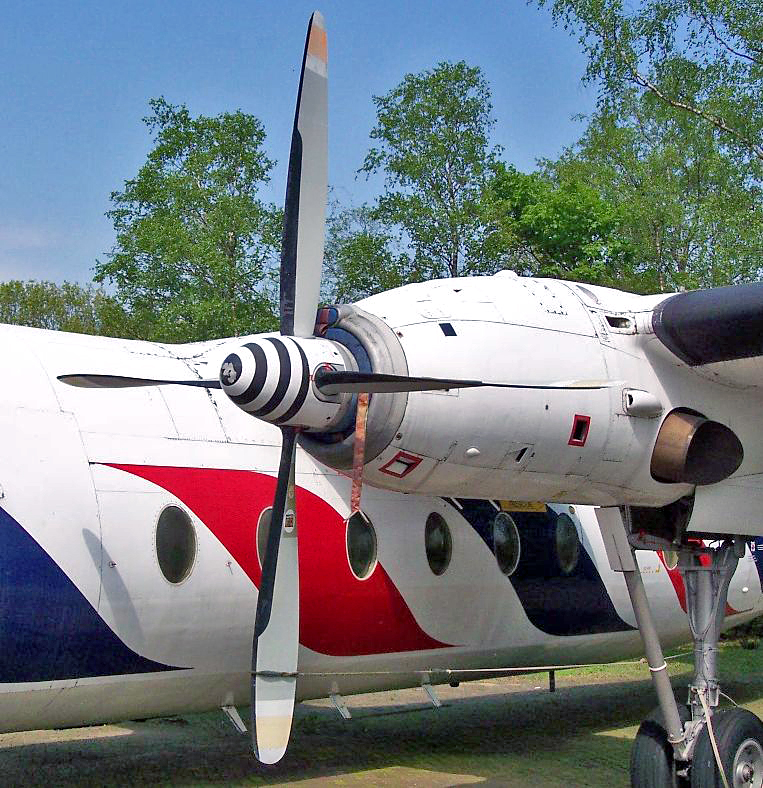
A Dart fitted to a Fokker F.27 Friendship airliner

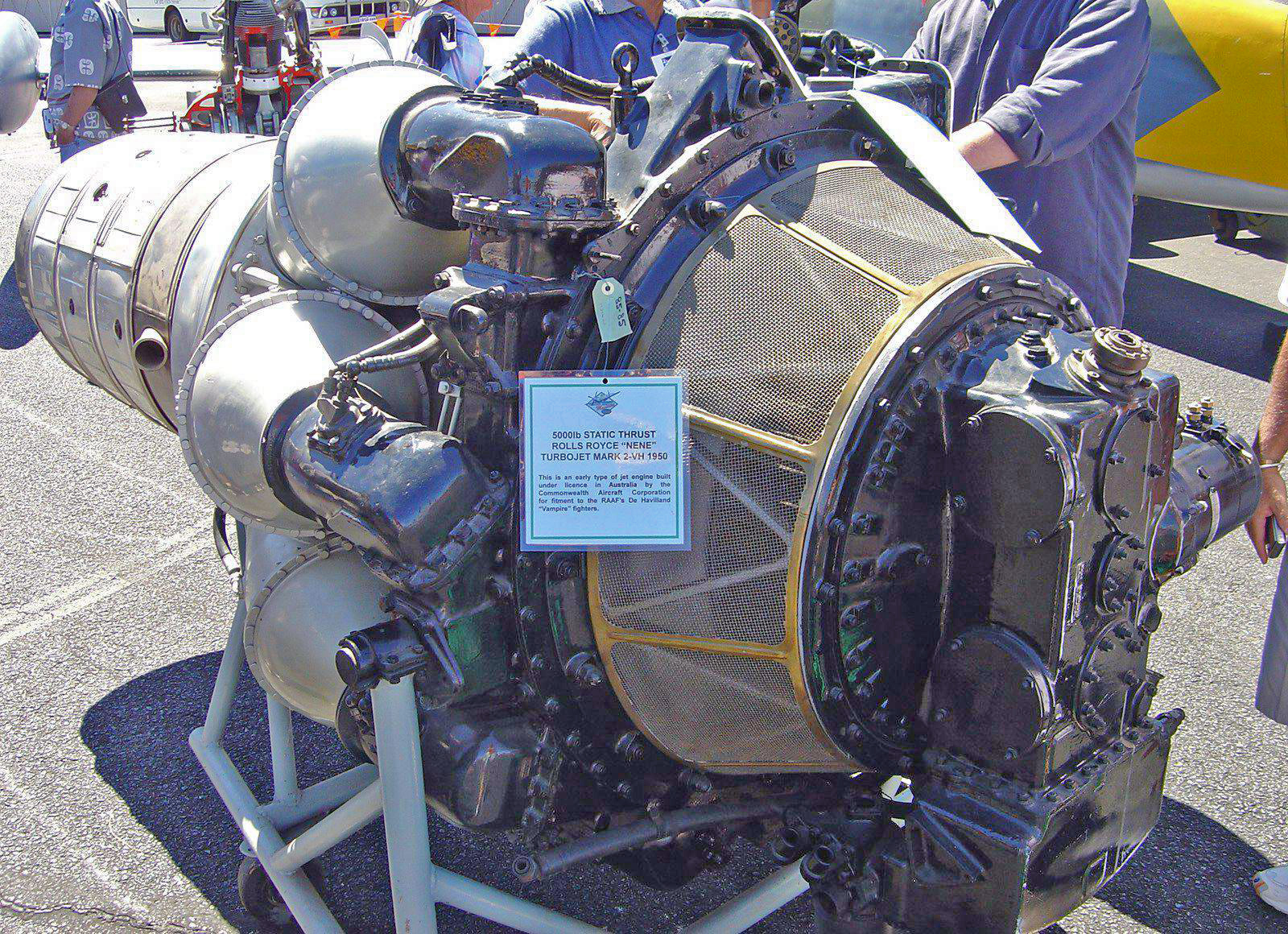
A Nene turbojet of the late 1940s

In 1907, Charles Rolls, whose interests had turned increasingly to flying, tried unsuccessfully to persuade Royce and the other directors to design an aero engine. When World War I broke out in August 1914, Rolls-Royce (and many others) were taken by surprise. As a manufacturer of luxury cars, Rolls-Royce was immediately vulnerable, and Claude Johnson thought the bank would withdraw its overdraft facility on which Rolls-Royce depended at that time. Nevertheless, believing that war was likely to be short-lived the directors initially decided not to seek government work making aero engines. However, this position was quickly reversed and Rolls-Royce was persuaded by the War Office to manufacture fifty air-cooled V8 engines under licence from Renault. Meanwhile, the Royal Aircraft Factory asked Rolls-Royce to design a new 200 hp (150 kW) engine. Despite initial reluctance, they agreed, and during 1915, developed Rolls-Royce's first aero engine, the twelve-cylinder Eagle. This was quickly followed by the smaller six-cylinder Hawk, the 190 hp (140 kW) Falcon and, just before the end of the war, the larger 675 hp (503 kW) Condor.

Throughout World War I, Rolls-Royce struggled to build aero engines in the quantities required by the War Office. However, with the exception of Brazil Straker in Bristol, Rolls-Royce resisted pressure to license production to other manufacturers, fearing that the engines' much admired quality and reliability would risk being compromised. Instead the Derby factory was extended to enable Rolls-Royce to increase its own production rates. By the late 1920s, aero engines made up most of Rolls-Royce's business.

Henry Royce's last design was the Merlin aero engine, which was first flown in prototype form in 1935, although he had died in 1933. This was developed from the R engine, which had powered a record-breaking Supermarine S.6B seaplane to almost 400 mph (640 km/h) in the 1931 Schneider Trophy. The Merlin was a powerful supercharged V12 engine and was fitted into many World War II aircraft: the British Hawker Hurricane, Supermarine Spitfire, de Havilland Mosquito (twin-engine), Avro Lancaster (four-engine) (a development of the Avro Manchester with its unreliable Rolls-Royce Vulture engines), Vickers Wellington (twin-engine); it also transformed the American North American P-51 Mustang into a competitor for the best fighter of its time, its engine a Merlin engine built by Packard under licence. Over 160,000 Merlin engines were produced, including over 30,000 by the Ford Motor Company at Trafford Park, Manchester. During the war most Rolls-Royce flight testing of engines was carried out from Hucknall Aerodrome. The Merlin crossed over into military land-vehicle use as the Meteor powering the Centurion tank among others. Many Meteor engines used engine blocks and parts that failed requirements for high performance engines, but were suitable for use in the derated 480 kW (640 hp) Meteor.

In December 1942, over a "five-shilling meal" at the Swan and Royal hotel in Clitheroe, Stanley Hooker and Ernest Hives of Rolls-Royce agreed with Spencer Wilks of the Rover Car Company that Rolls-Royce would take over top secret work on the development of the jet engine. An exchange of assets followed with Rover and in the post-World War II period Rolls-Royce made significant advances in gas turbine engine design and manufacture. The Dart and Tyne turboprop engines were particularly important, enabling airlines to cut times for shorter journeys whilst jet airliners were introduced on longer services. The Dart engine was used in Armstrong Whitworth AW.660 Argosy, Avro 748, Fokker F27 Friendship, Handley Page Herald and Vickers Viscount aircraft, whilst the more powerful Tyne powered the Breguet Atlantique, Transall C-160, Short Belfast, and Vickers Vanguard, and the SR.N4 hovercraft. Many of these turboprops are still in service.

Amongst the jet engines of this period was the RB163 Spey, which powers the Hawker Siddeley Trident, BAC One-Eleven, Grumman Gulfstream II and Fokker F28 Fellowship.

During the late 1950s and 1960s there was a significant rationalisation of all aspects of British aerospace and this included aero-engine manufacturers. In 1966 Rolls-Royce acquired Bristol Siddeley (which had resulted from the merger of Armstrong Siddeley and Bristol Aero Engines in 1959) and incorporated it as the Bristol Siddeley division. Bristol Siddeley, with its principal factory at Filton, near Bristol, had a strong base in military engines, including the Olympus, Viper, Pegasus (vectored thrust) and Orpheus. They were also manufacturing the Olympus 593 Mk610 to be used in Concorde in collaboration with SNECMA. They also had a turbofan project with SNECMA.

According to the prospectus published for the 1987 issue of shares to members of the public Rolls-Royce was by then one of only three enterprises outside USSR and China able to design develop and produce large gas turbine engines. At that time its engines were installed in the aircraft of more than 270 civil carriers and were used by 110 armed services and 700 operators of executive and corporate aircraft.

In addition, its turbines powered the naval vessels of 25 different nations. Over 175 industrial customers operated Rolls-Royce gas turbines for power generation, gas and oil pumping and other industrial purposes. Its single most important customer was the United Kingdom's government. In the preceding five years about 70 per cent of production went outside the United Kingdom.

Leavesden Aerodrome, Watford was originally owned by the Ministry of Defence and used during World War II for the manufacture of Mosquito and Halifax aircraft. For a number of years, Rolls-Royce used the site for the manufacture of helicopter engines until the site closed in June 1993. The former Rolls-Royce factory at Watford is now known as the Leavesden Film Studios and has produced world-famous films, including the James Bond, Star Wars and Harry Potter series.

== RB211—the 1971 receivership and nationalisation ==
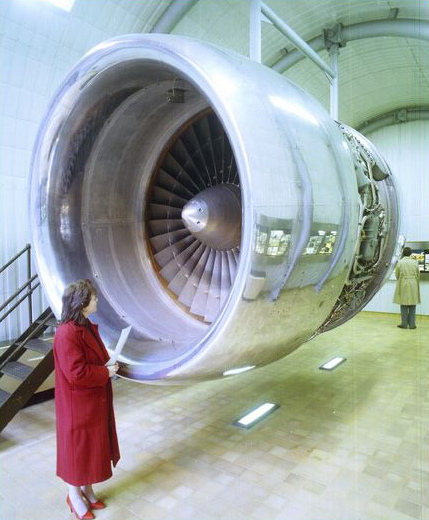
RB211 Derby museum display. Forty years after nationalisation its versions still powered around half of the long-haul airliners in service.

The amalgamations and disappearances of the 1950s and 1960s left a small number of major airframe manufacturers based in only a few countries. The competition for the very large contracts to supply their engines grew intense. Expensive research and development became vital. Real profits came from the maintenance contracts which might peak a whole human generation later. By the 1980s it was said that each generation of aero engines cost around 10 times that of its parent.

At this time Rolls-Royce employed 80,000 people and it was Britain's 14th largest company in terms of manpower. It was generally known that problems had recently arisen requiring government support of the RB211 programme as one outcome of intense financial competition with Pratt & Whitney and General Electric for the original RB211 contract.

In the new year of 1971 financial problems caused largely by development of this new RB211 turbofan engine designed and developed for Lockheed Aircraft Corporation's new L-1011 TriStar led, after several government-provided cash subsidies, to the recognition Rolls-Royce had no resources left and it voluntarily entered receivership 4 February 1971. The Rolls-Royce (Purchase) Act 1971 was passed to enable the government to nationalise it.

There were said to have been acrimonious telephone conversations between US president Richard Nixon and the British prime minister Edward Heath but these were subsequently denied. Responding to questions as to how the situation could have arisen the chief executive advised that in their calculations they were guided by the success of their estimates in the launching of their Spey engine.

Had the government simply nationalised Rolls-Royce it would have been unable to avoid the obligations to Lockheed.

The situation was handled in the usual manner with the assets being sold for cash, in this case to the government, leaving the massive liabilities to be dealt with by Rolls-Royce Limited using the funds realised by the sale. However the government would not fix a purchase price for the assets until the situation became clearer because without a continuing business many of them might be worthless. (Note: The price for the aero engines division was not fixed until June 1973 but more than seven years passed before the liquidation was complete) In the meantime the government would use the assets to continue the activities of the aero-engine, marine and industrial gas turbine and small engine divisions that were important to national defence, the collective programmes with other countries and to many air forces and civil airlines. A new company (1971) was incorporated that May to purchase substantially the whole of the undertakings and assets of the four divisions of Rolls-Royce connected with gas turbine engines. The original company, Rolls-Royce Limited, was placed in liquidation on 4 October 1971.

Asking their own government for support Lockheed warned that a switch to either Pratt & Whitney or General Electric engines would delay production by an extra six months and might force Lockheed into bankruptcy.

The receiver negotiated with Lockheed which consented to waive damages allowing the plant to be shut down. The continuing support of the trade creditors was also achieved by the receiver in spite of threats to demand immediate payments in full and to withdraw supplies. The first asset sold was British Aircraft Corporation bought equally by Vickers and GEC. The receiver floated Rolls-Royce Motors in 1973.

=== New board ===
The new owner, Rolls-Royce (1971) Limited, had among its board members Lord Cole (a former chairman of Unilever), Sir Arnold Weinstock (managing director of GEC), Hugh Conway (managing director Rolls-Royce Gas Turbines), Dr Stanley Hooker (Rolls-Royce Bristol), Sir William Cook (an adviser to the Minister of Defence), Sir St. John Elstub (managing director of Imperial Metal Industries), and Sir Charles Elworthy (former Marshal of the Royal Air Force and Chief of the Defence Staff).

=== Lockheed and Rolls-Royce take-off ===
The new aircraft with its three RB211 engines left USA for the first time and arrived in Paris on 1 June 1971. At Palmdale California the L-1011 received its US Federal Aviation Administration's certificate of airworthiness on 14 April 1972, nine months late. On the day the chairman of Lockeed said "...we know that in airline service it (RB211) will prove itself to be one of the leading power plants in aviation history".

The first airliner was delivered to Eastern Air Lines on 5 April 1972 but it had been beaten in the race to production by McDonnell Douglas's DC-10.

== 1973 Rolls-Royce Motors ==
Rolls-Royce Motors Limited was incorporated on 25 April 1971, two and a half months after Rolls-Royce fell into receivership. Under the ownership of the receiver, it began to trade in April 1971 – manufacturing motor cars, diesel and petrol engines, coachwork and other items previously made by Rolls-Royce's motor car and diesel divisions and Mulliner Park Ward. It continued to take on precision engineering work on sub-contracts.

In June 1971, it acquired all the business and assets used by the motor car and diesel divisions of Rolls-Royce and Mulliner Park Ward. Rolls-Royce Motors' permitted uses of the various Rolls-Royce trade marks were very precisely defined.

At the end of 1972, Rolls-Royce Motors employees in the United Kingdom numbered 5,855 in the car division and 2,311 in the diesel division, for a total of 8,166 people. In May 1973, the business was sold to Rolls-Royce Motors Holdings Limited in preparation for its public flotation.

=== Car Division ===
At that time, the Car Division, as well as making cars and special coachwork, carried out investment foundry work and the machining of aero-engine components. It also produced piston engines for light aircraft, together with other petrol and multi-fuel engines. Both divisions carried out development work for the British government.

The car division's headquarters were in Pym's Lane and Minshull New Road, Crewe. Bespoke coachbuilding remained in Hythe Road and High Road, Willesden, London. The Crewe former shadow factory premises were bought from the government at this time.

=== Diesel Division ===
The Diesel Division made several types of diesel engine at its premises in Whitchurch Road, Shrewsbury, as well as combustion equipment for aero turbine engines.

Rolls-Royce Motors products

- Motor cars
- Diesel engines
- Aero turbine engine components and aircraft piston engines mainly for Rolls-Royce 1971
- Other engines and products:

B range of 6 and 8-cylinder petrol engines
K range of multi-fuel engines
various transmissions for fighting and other vehicles
diesel shunting locomotives (Thomas Hill (Rotherham))

=== Flotation of Rolls-Royce Motors Holdings ===
In the event, the flotation met with a disappointing public response, and more than 80 per cent of the issue was left in the hands of the underwriters.

=== Merger with Vickers ===
On 6 August 1980, the shareholders' agreement to the merger of Rolls-Royce Motors Holdings and Vickers Limited became unconditional. Vickers would sell Rolls-Royce Motors to Volkswagen Group in 1998 without the trademark, which was controlled by the aeroengine company, so it was renamed to Bentley Motors, with BMW then establishing a new manufacturer named Rolls-Royce Motor Cars.

=== Perkins Engines ===
The Rolls-Royce diesel business was acquired from Vickers in 1984 by Perkins Engines. Perkins further developed the Eagle Diesels into the Perkins TX series of engines.

== 1977 Rolls-Royce drops (1971) from its name ==
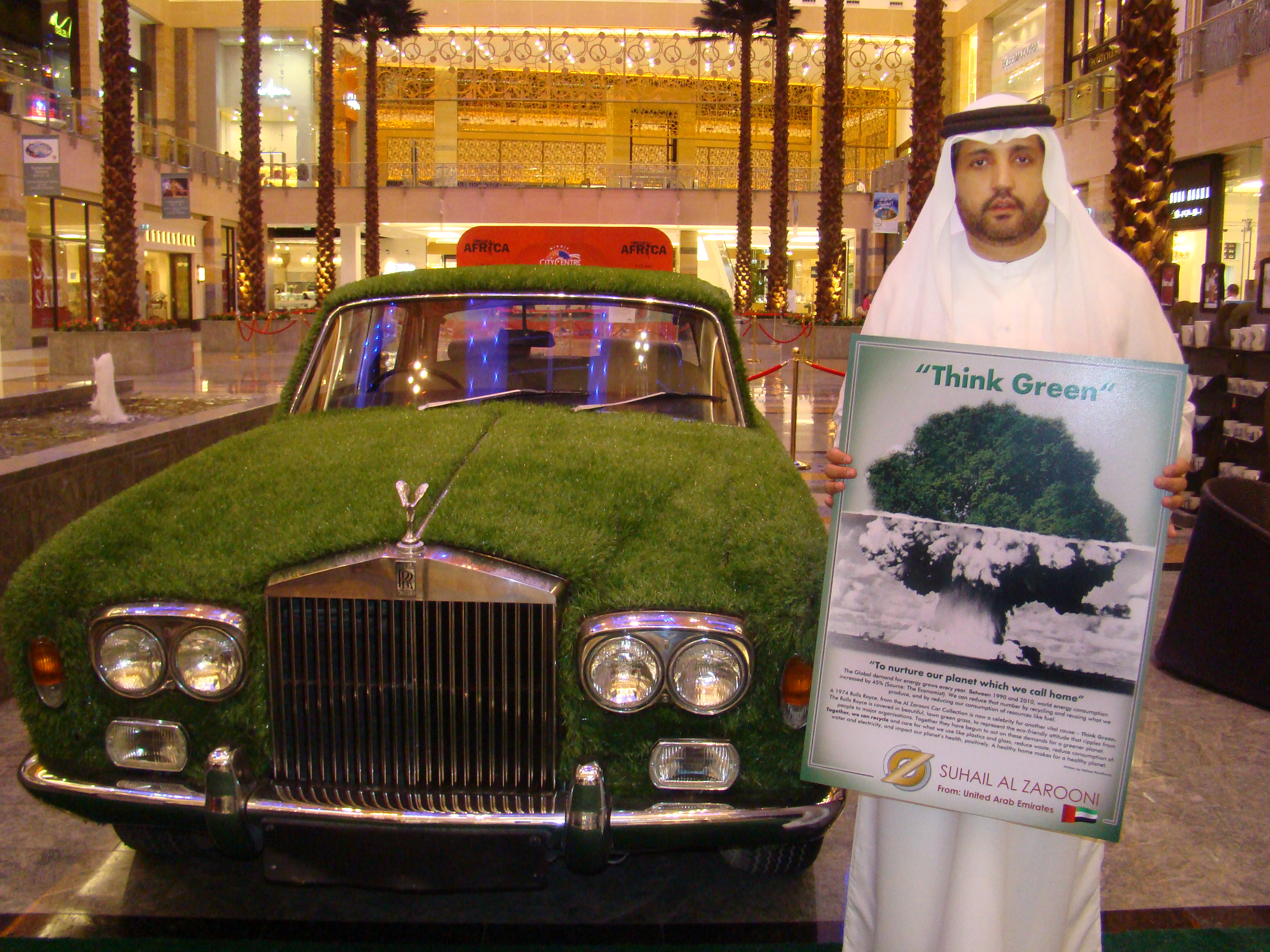
A 1974 Rolls Royce from the Suhail Al Zarooni Car Collection

The name of Rolls-Royce (1971) Limited was changed to Rolls-Royce Limited on 31 December 1977 the end of the company's financial year. The original Rolls-Royce Limited incorporated in 1906 and still in liquidation had been renamed R-R Realisations Limited (Note: After initially being dissolved in 2004, it was returned to the companies register in 2010, 2015 and 2021 under court orders with its name being its original company registration number as 00087989 Limited) and had consented in March 1977 to the (1971) company being named Rolls-Royce Limited

Limited was replaced by plc (public limited company) in the summer of 1986 so shares could be offered to the public and traded on sharemarkets.

== 1987 privatisation ==
In April 1987, the government offered for sale all Rolls-Royce plc shares. The heavily advertised issue was a remarkable success.

Rolls-Royce's was an exceptionally long-term business. Before a civil aero engine went into service, its development could take 4 to 6 years, military engines often longer. Production might then extend a further 50 years including the manufacture of spare parts required long after complete engine production ends.

=== Competition ===
Rolls-Royce's competitors were GE and Pratt & Whitney (UTC). Aero engines were then only a part of GE and UTC activities as major industrial groups.

Others included SNECMA, Turbomeca, MTU, Fiat Aviazione in Europe and USA's Avco, Garrett and General Motors' Allison. Despite the field being exceptionally competitive, a number of the smaller manufacturers were already in collaboration with GE or with other smaller manufacturers, as was Rolls-Royce as well.

A marketing survey in 1987 showed that only Coca-Cola was a more widely known brand than Rolls-Royce.

=== Divisions and products ===
At that time Rolls-Royce was organised into five business groups:

1. ICEG Civil Aero – demand governed by airline activity and profitability
- major engines in 1987:

RB211-524, 535 series;
IAE V2500 for Airbus A320, a consortium of Rolls-Royce 30%, Pratt & Whitney 30%, JAEC 23%, MTU 11% and Fiat 6%
Tay, a development of the Spey superfan

- engines out of production but generating a significant demand for spares

Avon (1951), Conway (1960), Dart (1953), Olympus 593 (1976), RB211-22B (1972), Spey (1964), Tyne (1960)

2. MEG Military Aero – demand had been stable recently and so of major importance to Rolls-Royce
- major engines in 1987:

RB199
Pegasus (with vectored thrust for VTOL combat aircraft)
Adour
Spey
Viper
EJ200

- helicopter engines

Gnome
Gem
RTM322

- missile engines

Odin

3. I&M Industrial and Marine – aero derived gas turbine engines
4. Repair and Overhaul
5. Nuclear – submarine steam-raising equipment

together with these Services:
Supply
Corporate Engineering

== Products ==
=== Cars ===
chassis-only, no Rolls-Royce built Rolls-Royce body until Silver Dawn

- 1904–06 10 hp
- 1905–05 15 hp
- 1905–08 20 hp
- 1905–06 30 hp
- 1905–06 V-8
- 1906–25 40/50 Silver Ghost
- 1922–29 Twenty
- 1925–29 40/50 Phantom
- 1929–36 20/25
- 1929–35 Phantom II
- 1936–38 25/30
- 1936–39 Phantom III
- 1938–39 Wraith
- 1946–59 Silver Wraith
- 1949–55 Silver Dawn (Note: with first factory bodies using panels pressed by Pressed Steel Company, Cowley)
- 1950–56 Phantom IV
- 1955–65 Silver Cloud (Note: factory bodies using panels pressed by Pressed Steel Co.)
- 1959–68 Phantom V
- 1965–80 Silver Shadow monocoque (Note: integral body chassis wholly built by Rolls-Royce.)
- 1968–92 Phantom VI
- 1971–2002 Rolls-Royce Corniche
- 1980–89 Camargue (Note: designed by Pininfarina, luxury coupé; source: Rolls-Royce archives)
- 1980–90 Silver Spirit / Silver Spur (Note: shared platform, updated several times)
- 1989–2000 Silver Spur II / Silver Spirit II (Note: facelifted models with minor changes)
- 1998–2002 Silver Seraph (Note: last Rolls-Royce model under BMW before acquisition)
- 2003–2016 Phantom VII (Note: new BMW-built Phantom generation)
- 2003–2017 Rolls-Royce Phantom Drophead Coupé (Note: convertible version of Phantom VII)
- 2004–2020 Ghost (1st Generation)
- 2010–2022 Wraith (Note: luxury grand tourer; coupé version of Ghost platform)
- 2012–2023 Dawn (Note: convertible version of Wraith; luxury 2-door)
- 2015–present Rolls-Royce Cullinan (Note: first SUV by Rolls-Royce; luxury off-roader)
- 2017–present Phantom VIII (Note: latest generation Phantom luxury sedan)
- 2020–present Ghost (2nd Generation) (Note: smaller luxury sedan based on Phantom chassis)
- 2023–present Spectre

Notes

Bentley Models (from 1933) – chassis only

- 1933–37 Bentley 3½ L
- 1936–39 Bentley 4¼ L
- 1939–41 Bentley Mark V
Standard saloons
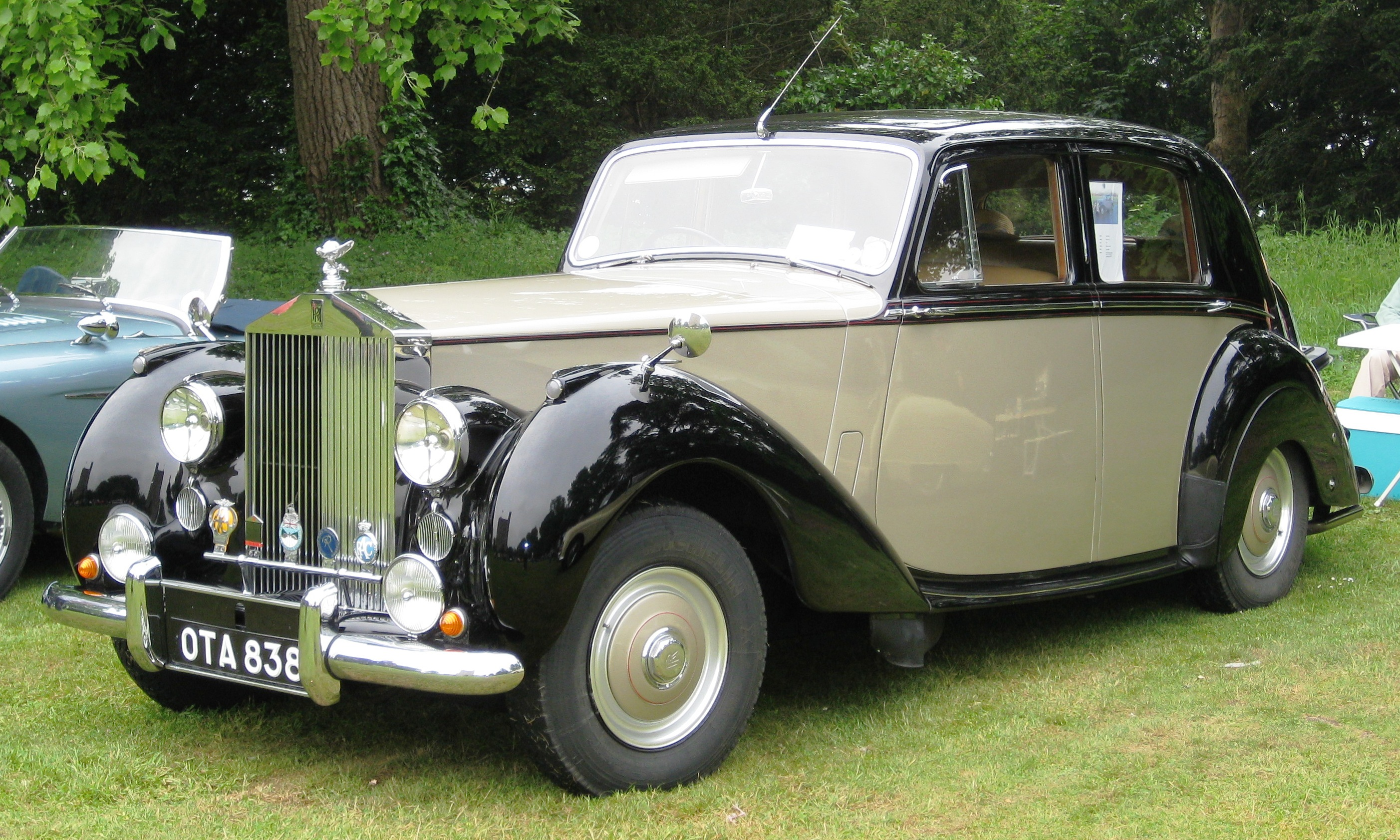
Silver Dawn 1953

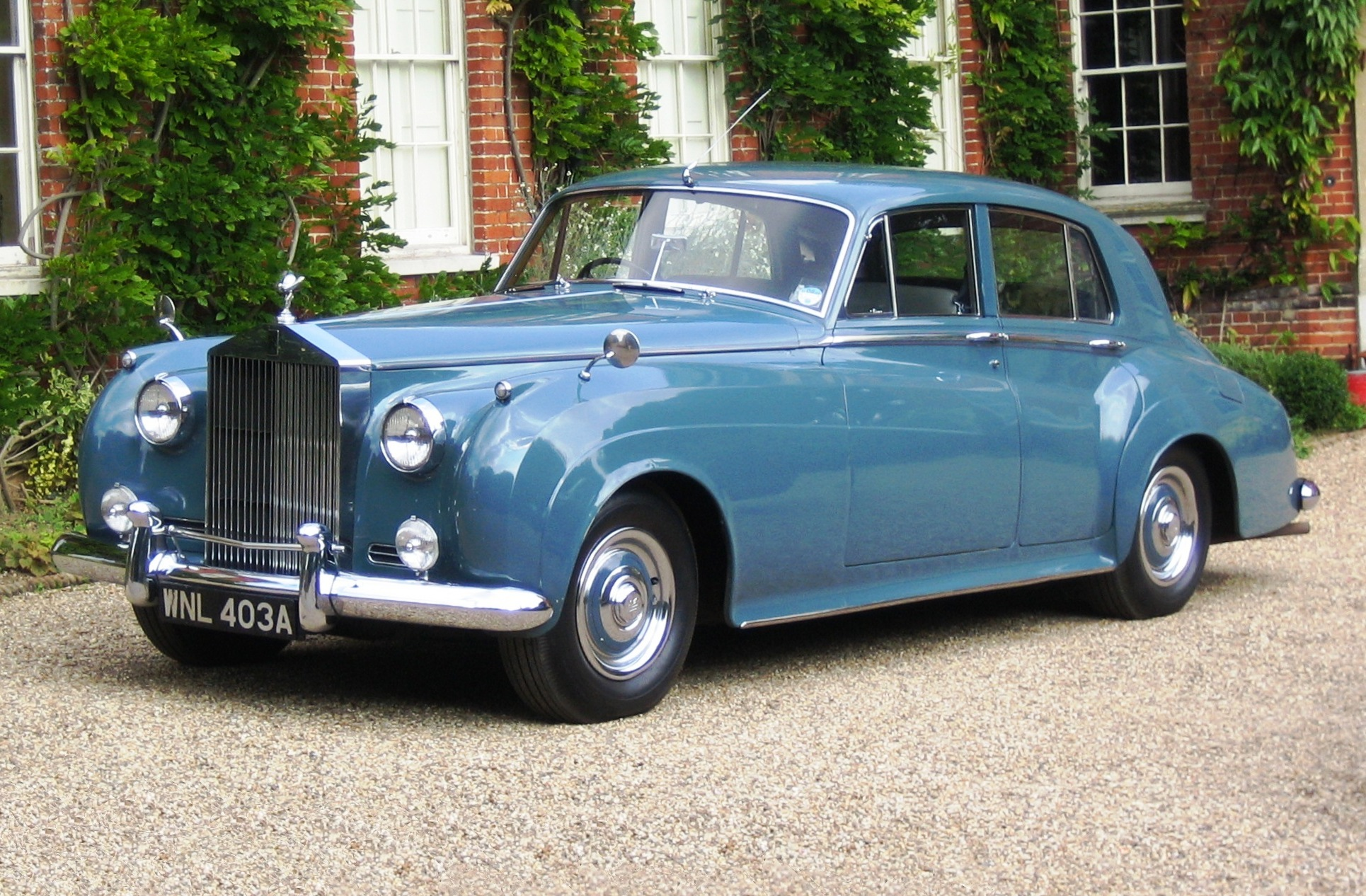
Silver Cloud 1956

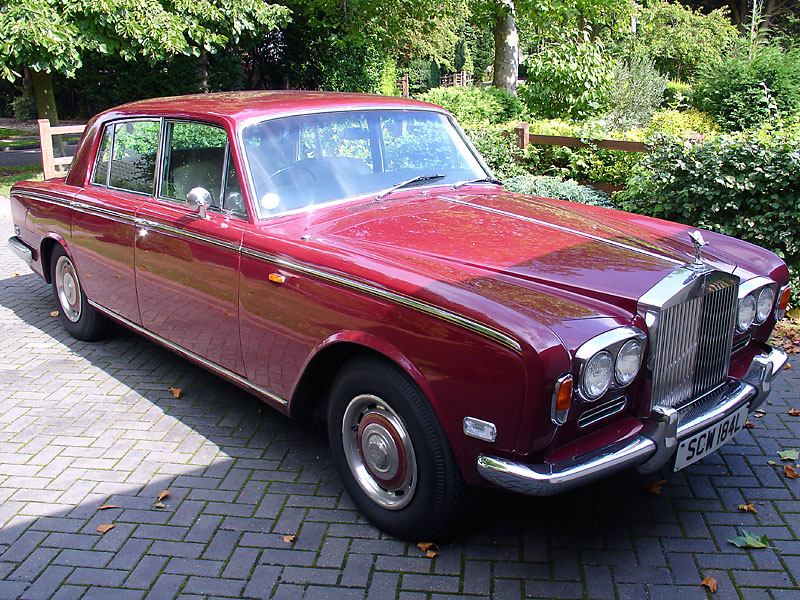
Silver Shadow 1972
Postwar Phantoms
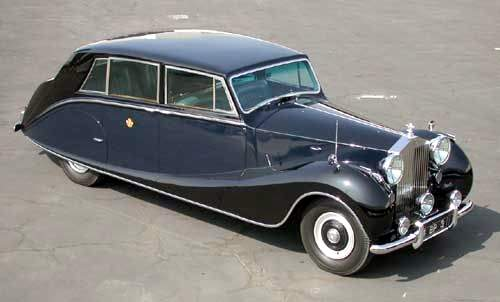
Phantom IV limousine by Hooper 1953

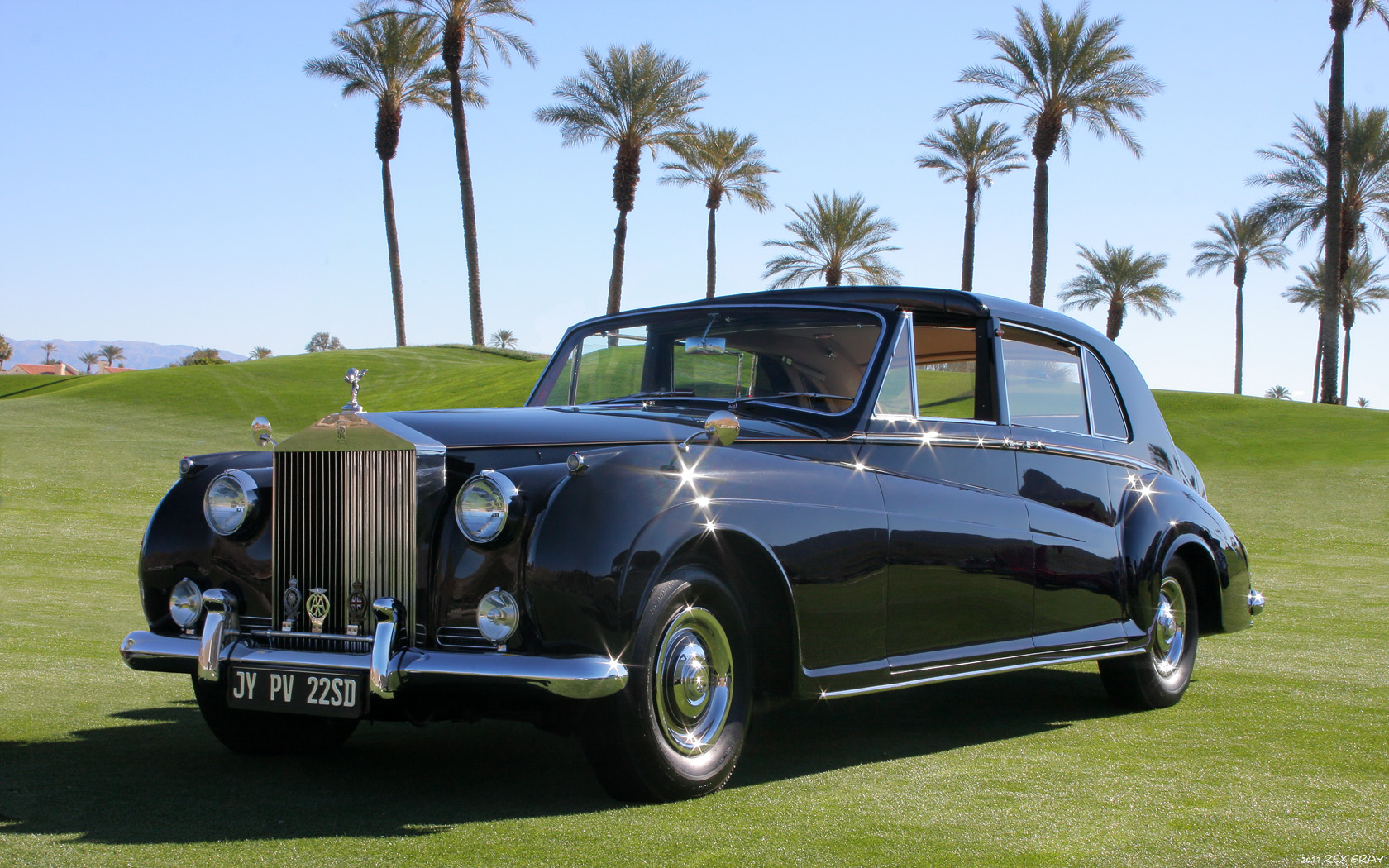
Phantom V sedanca de ville by James Young 1961

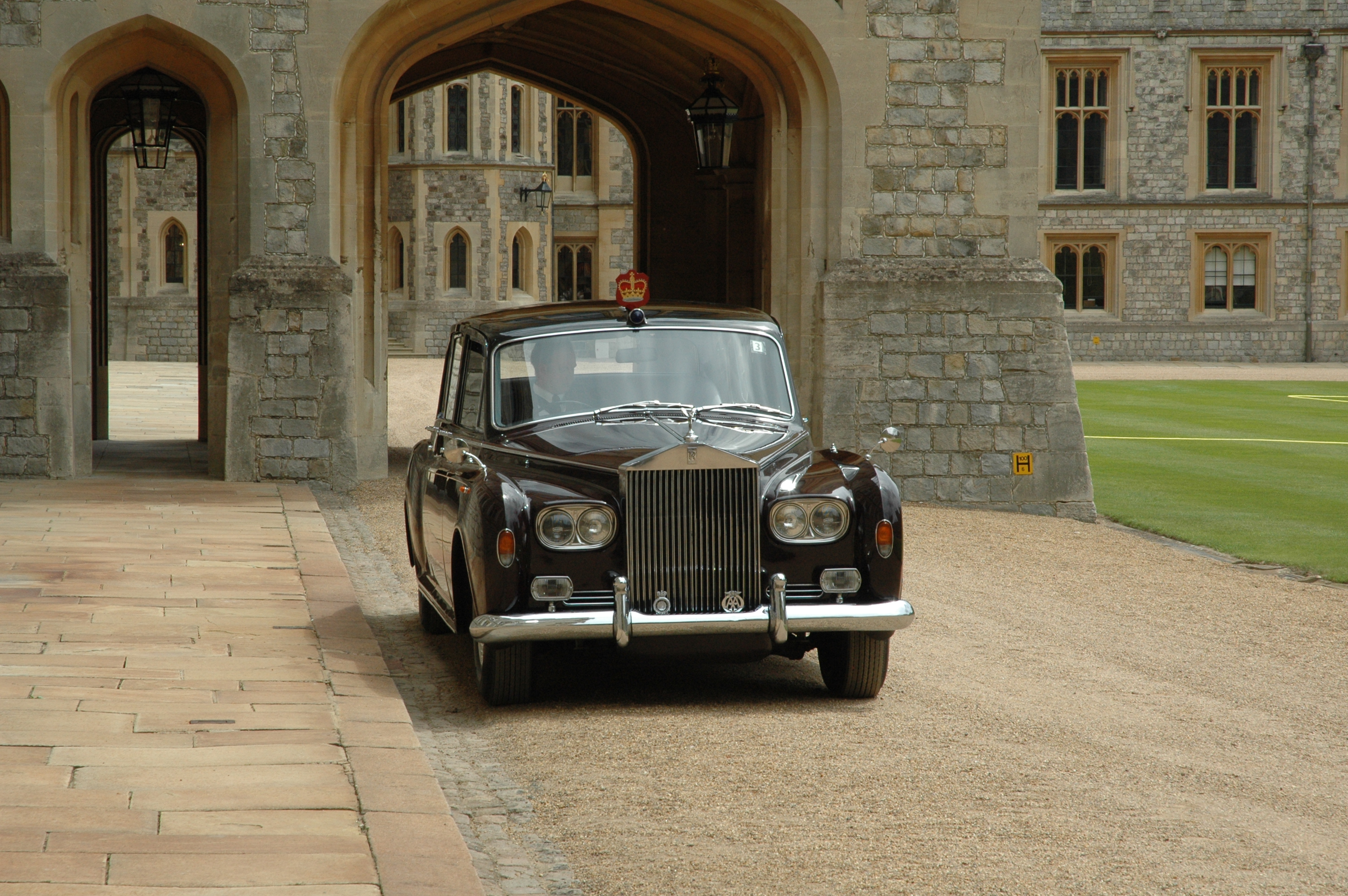
Phantom VI limousine

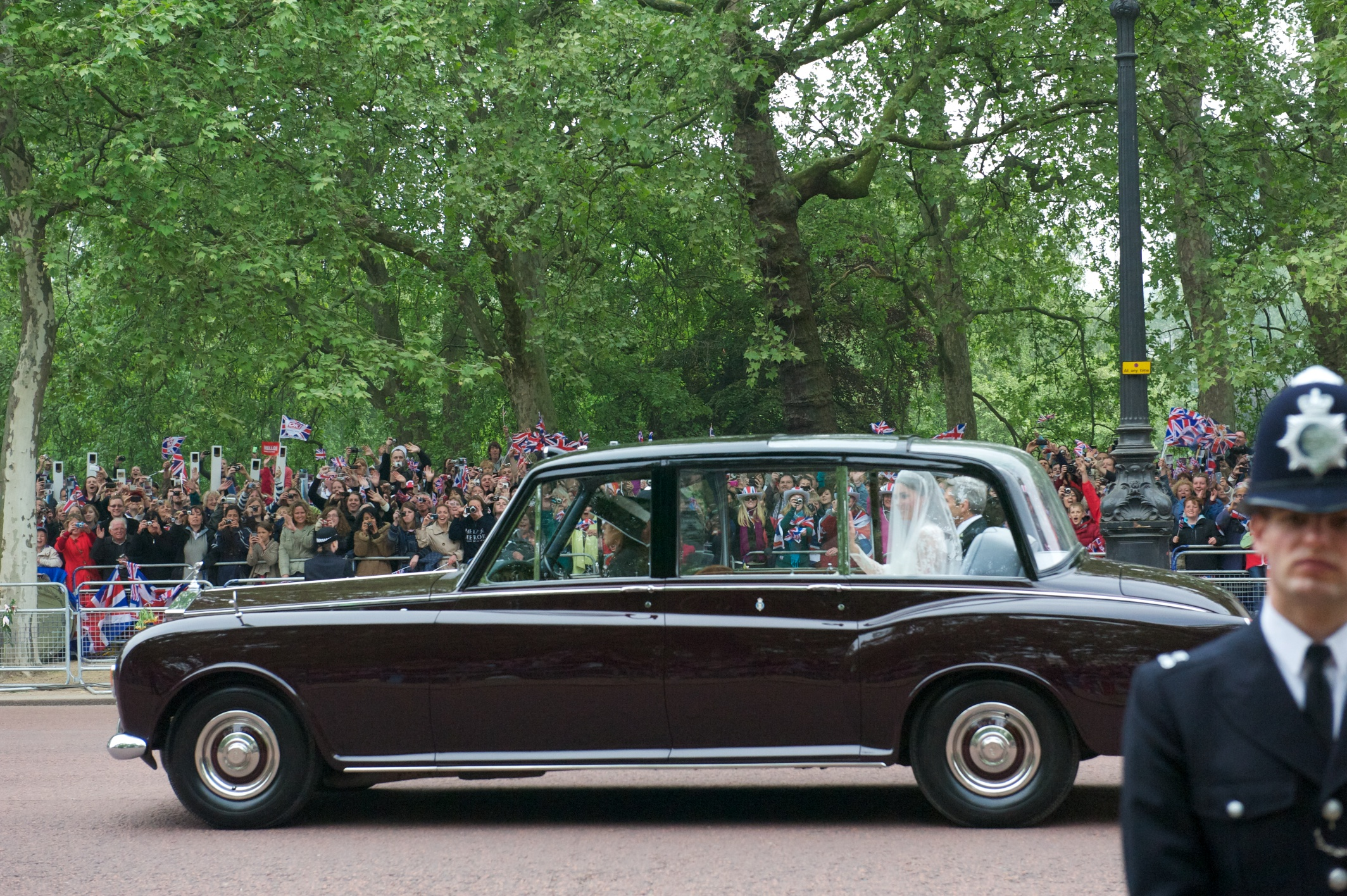
Phantom VI limousine

=== Aircraft ===
- Rolls-Royce Thrust Measuring Rig
- Rolls-Royce Mustang Mk.X

== Bibliography ==
- Bird, Anthony; Hallows, Ian (1984). The Rolls-Royce Motor Car and the Bentley since 1931 (5 ed.). New York: St. Martin’s Press. ISBN 0-312-68957-8. (1st edition 1964)
- Clarke, Tom C. (1995). Ernest Claremont: A Manchester life with Rolls-Royce and W.T. Glover & Co. Manchester: Hulme Press. ISBN 0-9526391-0-6.
- Donne, Michael (1981). Leader of the skies - Rolls-Royce: The First Seventy-Five Years (Softcover). London: Frederick Muller Limited. ISBN 978-0584104769.
- Driver, Hugh (1998). Lord Northcliffe - and the early years of Rolls-Royce. Rolls-Royce Heritage Trust. ISBN 978-0951439449. Nº 27.. Describes Lord Northcliffe's support for the emerging automobile industry and his association with Rolls-Royce.
- Evans, M. H. (2004). In the Beginning - The Manchester Origins of Rolls-Royce. Rolls-Royce Heritage Trust. ISBN 1-872922-27-9. Nº 4.
- Eyre, Donald (2005). 50 years with Rolls-Royce - My reminiscences. Rolls-Royce Heritage Trust. ISBN 1-872922-30-9. Nº 36.. The author recalls his work with Rolls- Royce, Henry Royce and A. A. Griffith.
- Harvey-Bailey, Alec (1992). Hives' Turbulent Barons. Rolls-Royce Heritage Trust. Nº 20.
- Harvey-Bailey, Alec (1989). The Sons Of Martha. Rolls-Royce Heritage Trust. Nº 14.. A personal account by the author of his 42-year career at Rolls-Royce.
- Lloyd, Ian (1978). Rolls-Royce: The Growth of a Firm (Softcover). London: Palgrave Macmillan. ISBN 978-1-349-03913-5.
- Pemberton, Max (1936). The Life of Sir Henry Royce: Bart., M.I.E.E., M.I.M.E: With some chapters from the stories of the late Charles S. Rolls and Claude Johnson (Hardcover). London: Selwyn & Blount.
- Pugh, Peter (2015). The Magic of a Name – The Rolls-Royce Story: The First 40 Years (Softcover). London: Icon Books. ISBN 978-184831-924-0.(1st edition 2000)
- Pugh, Peter (2001). The Magic of a Name – The Rolls-Royce Story, Part Two: The Power Behind the Jets (Hardcover). London: Icon Books. ISBN 978-1840462845.
- Pugh, Peter (2002). The Magic of a Name – The Rolls-Royce Story, Part Three: Family of Engines (Hardcover). London: Icon Books. ISBN 978-1840464054.
- Reese, Peter (2022). Sir Henry Royce: Establishing Rolls-Royce, from Motor Cars to Aero Engines (Softcover). Cheltenham, Gloucestershire: The History Press. ISBN 978-0-7509-9900-7.
- Rowland, John (1969). The Rolls-Royce Men: The Story of C.S. Rolls and Henry Royce. New York: Roy Publishers.
- Rubbra, A.A. (1990). Rolls-Royce Piston Aero Engines - A Designer Remembers. Rolls-Royce Heritage Trust. ISBN 1-872922-00-7. Nº 16.
- Shepherd, Graham (2022). The Rolls-Royce Oil Engine (Diesel) Division – A History. Rolls-Royce Heritage Trust. ISBN 978-1-872922-54-6. Nº 49.
- Tritton, Paul (2006). The Life and Times of Henry Edmunds: Pioneer, Entrepreneur and 'Godfather of Rolls-Royce' (Softcover). Rolls-Royce Heritage Trust. ISBN 978-1872922331. Nº 38.
