= List of Rolls-Royce motor cars =

This is a list of Rolls-Royce branded motor cars and includes vehicles manufactured by:

- Rolls-Royce Limited (1906–1973)
- Rolls-Royce Motors (1973–2003), which was created as a result of the demerger of Rolls-Royce Limited in 1973. Vickers plc owned Rolls-Royce Motors between 1980 and 1998. Volkswagen AG acquired Rolls-Royce Motors in 1998 and renamed the firm Bentley Motors Limited in 2003. Bentley Motors Limited is the direct successor of Rolls-Royce Motors and its predecessor entities and owns historical Rolls-Royce assets such as the Crewe factory, pre-2003 vehicle designs and the L Series V8 engine.
- Rolls-Royce Motor Cars, a subsidiary of BMW AG established in 1998 that began production of vehicles in 2003.

== Vehicles ==
=== Rolls-Royce Limited vehicles ===
- 1904–06 10 hp
- 1905–05 15 hp
- 1905–08 20 hp
- 1905–07 30 hp
- 1905–06 V-8
- 1906–25 40/50 Silver Ghost
- 1922–29 Twenty
- 1925–29 40/50 Phantom
- 1929–36 20/25
- 1929–35 Phantom II
- 1936–38 25/30
- 1936–39 Phantom III
- 1938–39 Wraith
- 1946–59 Silver Wraith
- 1949–55 Silver Dawn
- 1950–56 Phantom IV
- 1955–66 Silver Cloud
- 1959–68 Phantom V
- 1965–80 Silver Shadow/Silver Wraith II
- 1968–91 Phantom VI
- 1971–96 Corniche
- 1980–2000 Silver Spirit/Silver Spur

Bentley models (from 1933)

- 1933–37 Bentley 3½ L
- 1936–38 Bentley 4¼ L
- 1940–40 Bentley 4¼ L Mark V

=== Rolls-Royce vehicles ===
- 1975–86 Camargue
- 1980–2000 Silver Spirit/Silver Spur

Bentley models were produced mostly in parallel with the above cars. The Bentley Continental coupés (produced in various forms from the mid-1950s to the mid-1960s) did not have Rolls-Royce equivalents. Rolls-Royce Phantom limousines were also produced.

- 1998–2002 Silver Seraph/Park Ward

2000–02 Corniche

== Rolls-Royce vehicles ==
- 2003–17 Phantom VII
- 2007–16 Phantom Drophead Coupé
- 2008 Rolls-Royce Pininfarina Hyperion (Concept Coachbuilt car, a single unit has produced)
- 2008–16 Phantom Coupé
- 2010–present Ghost
- 2013–22 Wraith
- 2016–22 Dawn
- 2017 Sweptail (one-off)
- 2017–present Phantom VIII
- 2018–present Cullinan
- 2021–2022 Rolls-Royce Boat Tail (3 made)
- 2023–present Rolls-Royce Spectre (electric)
- 2023 Rolls-Royce Droptail (4 "expressions" made)

== See also ==
- FAB 1
- The Yellow Rolls-Royce

== Gallery ==
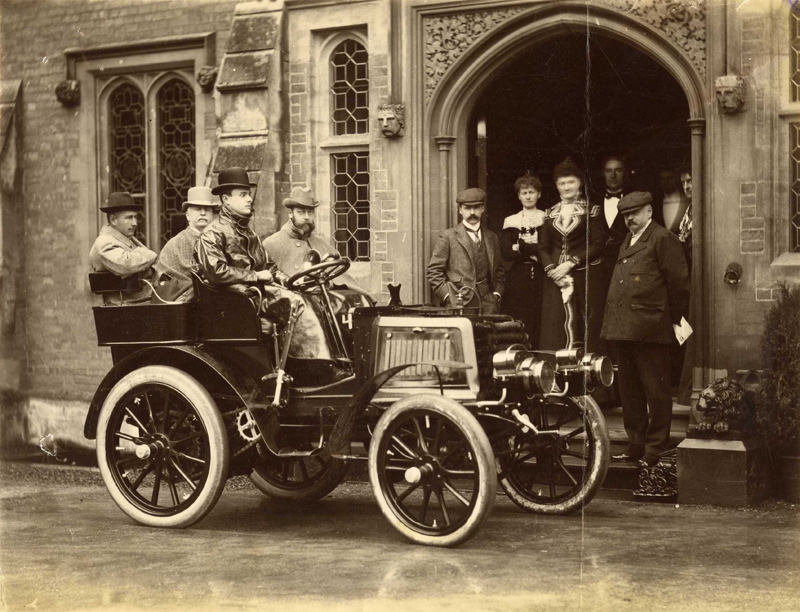
"the Hon. C.S. Rolls' autocar with HRH The Duke of York, Lord Llangattock, Sir Charles Cust and the Hon. C.S. Rolls as occupants" (1900). Charles Stewart Rolls went on to co-found Rolls-Royce in 1906.

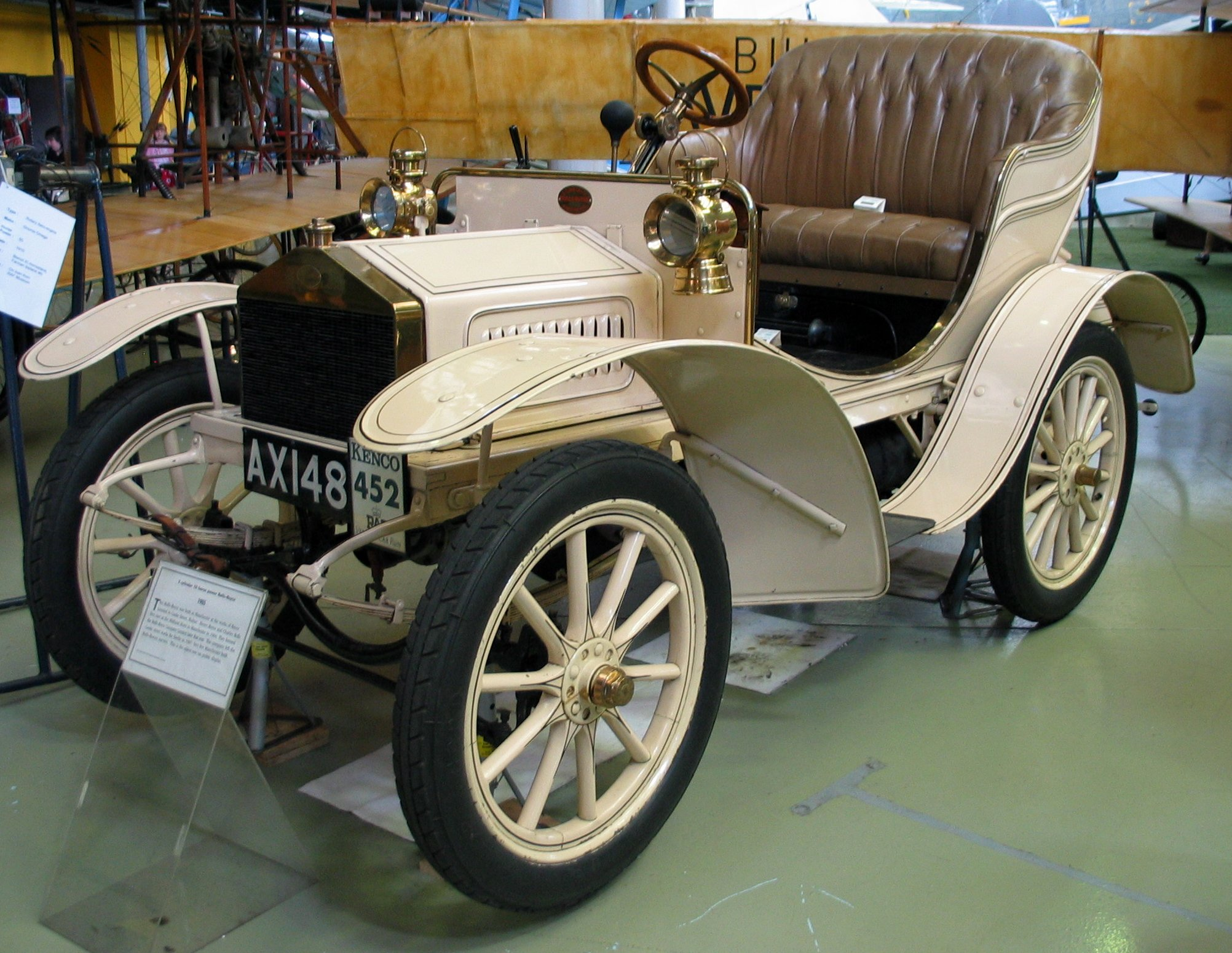
Original 1905 Rolls-Royce

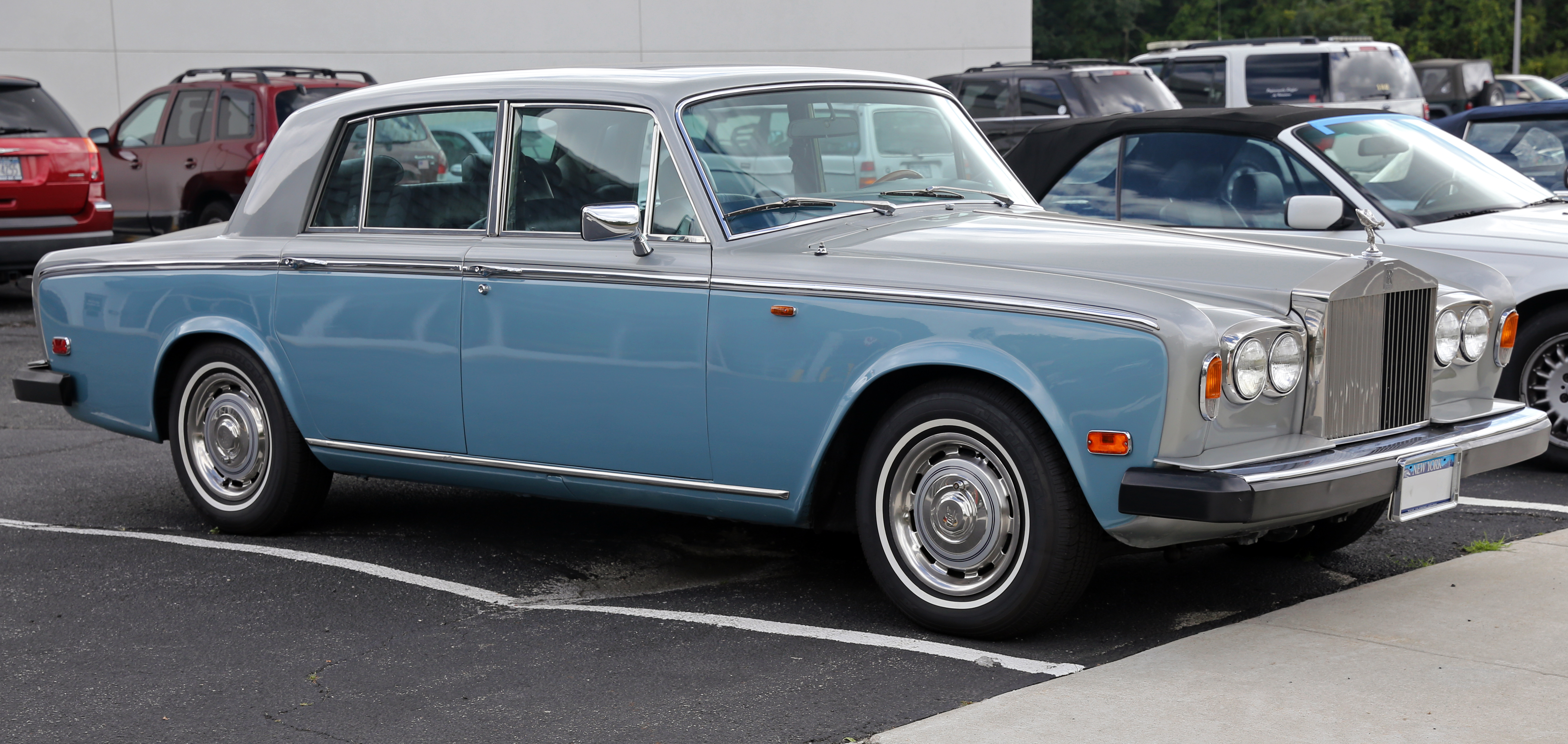
1980 Rolls-Royce Silver Shadow II

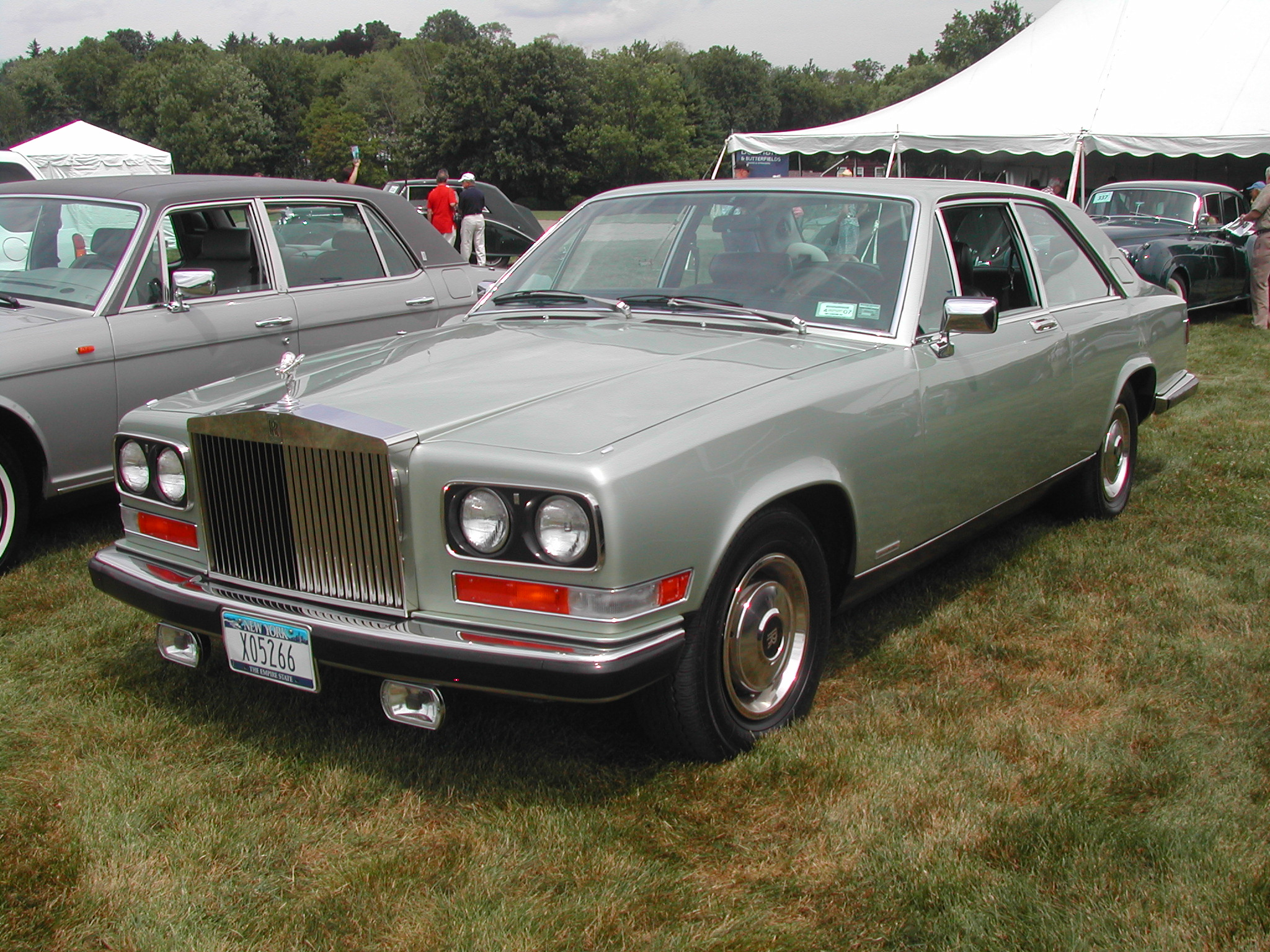
1982 Rolls-Royce Camargue

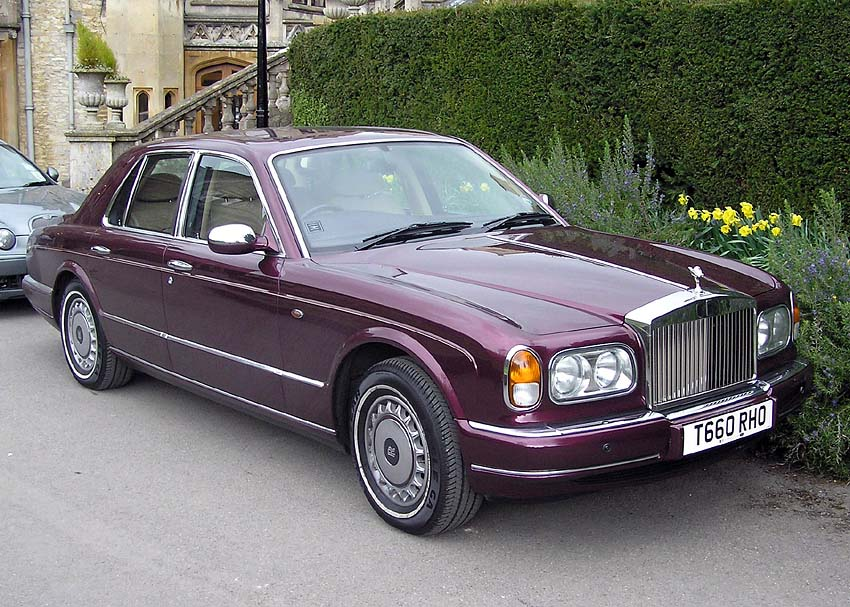
Rolls-Royce Silver Seraph

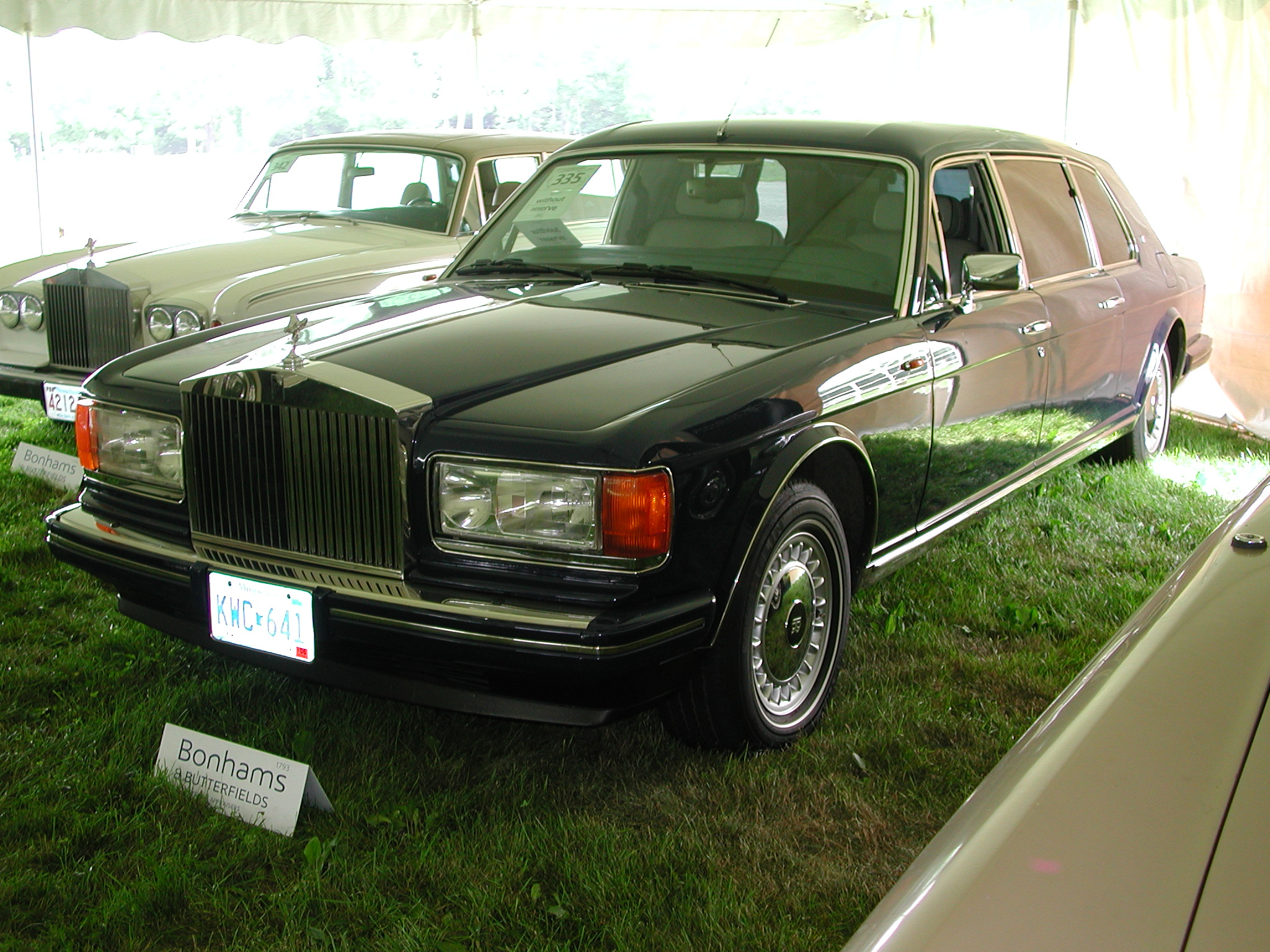
1994 Rolls-Royce Silver Spur Armoured Touring Limousine

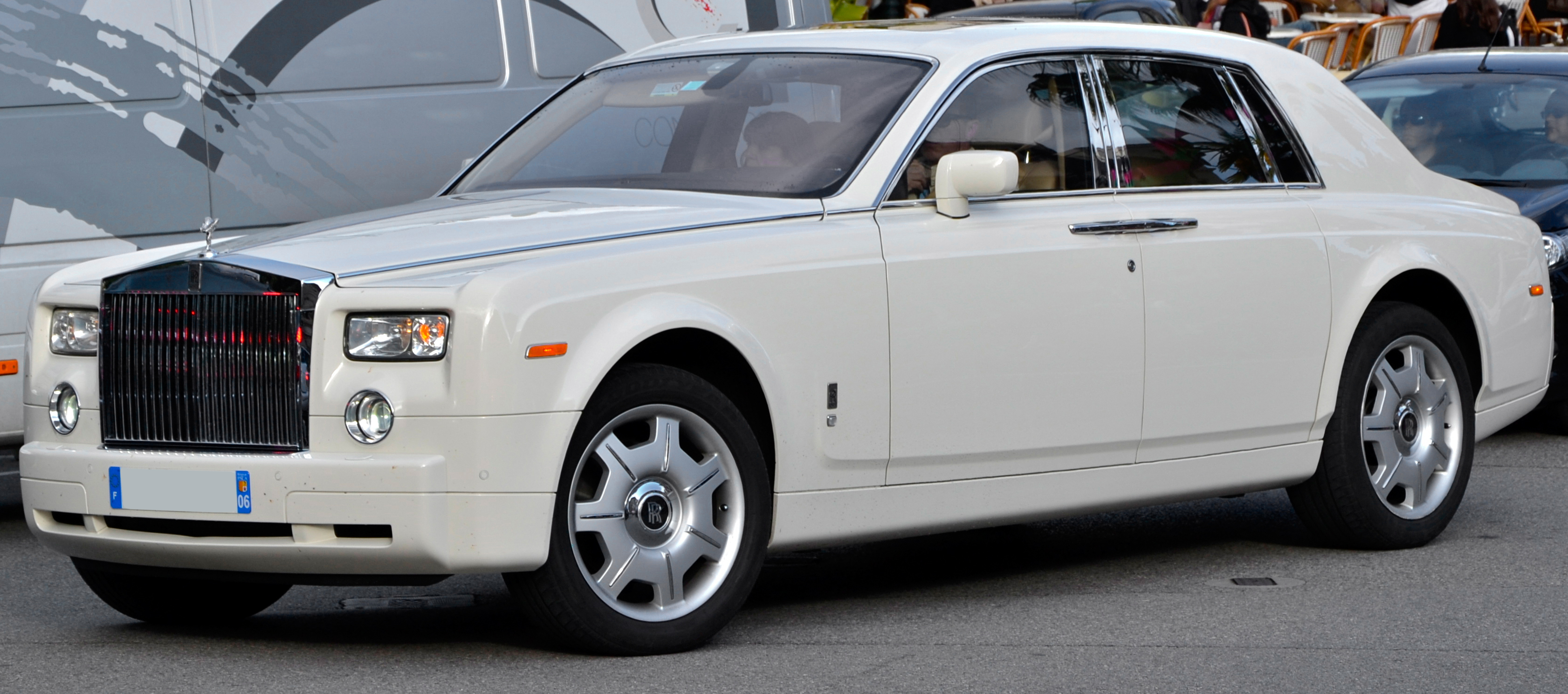
2005 Rolls-Royce Phantom
