= Rolls-Royce Wraith =

Rolls-Royce Wraith may refer to a number of different automobiles:

- Rolls-Royce Wraith (1938), a 1938 automobile by Rolls-Royce Limited
- Rolls-Royce Wraith (2013), a 2013 coupé by Rolls-Royce Motor Cars

== See also ==
- Rolls-Royce Silver Wraith, a 1946 automobile by Rolls-Royce Limited
- Rolls-Royce Silver Wraith II, an alternative name for the long-wheelbase model of the 1976 Silver Shadow II, also by Rolls-Royce Limited
