= Altered nuclear transfer =

Altered nuclear transfer is an alternative method of obtaining embryonic-like, pluripotent stem cells without the creation and destruction of human embryos. The process was originally proposed by William B. Hurlbut.
