= Rolls-Royce 20/25 =

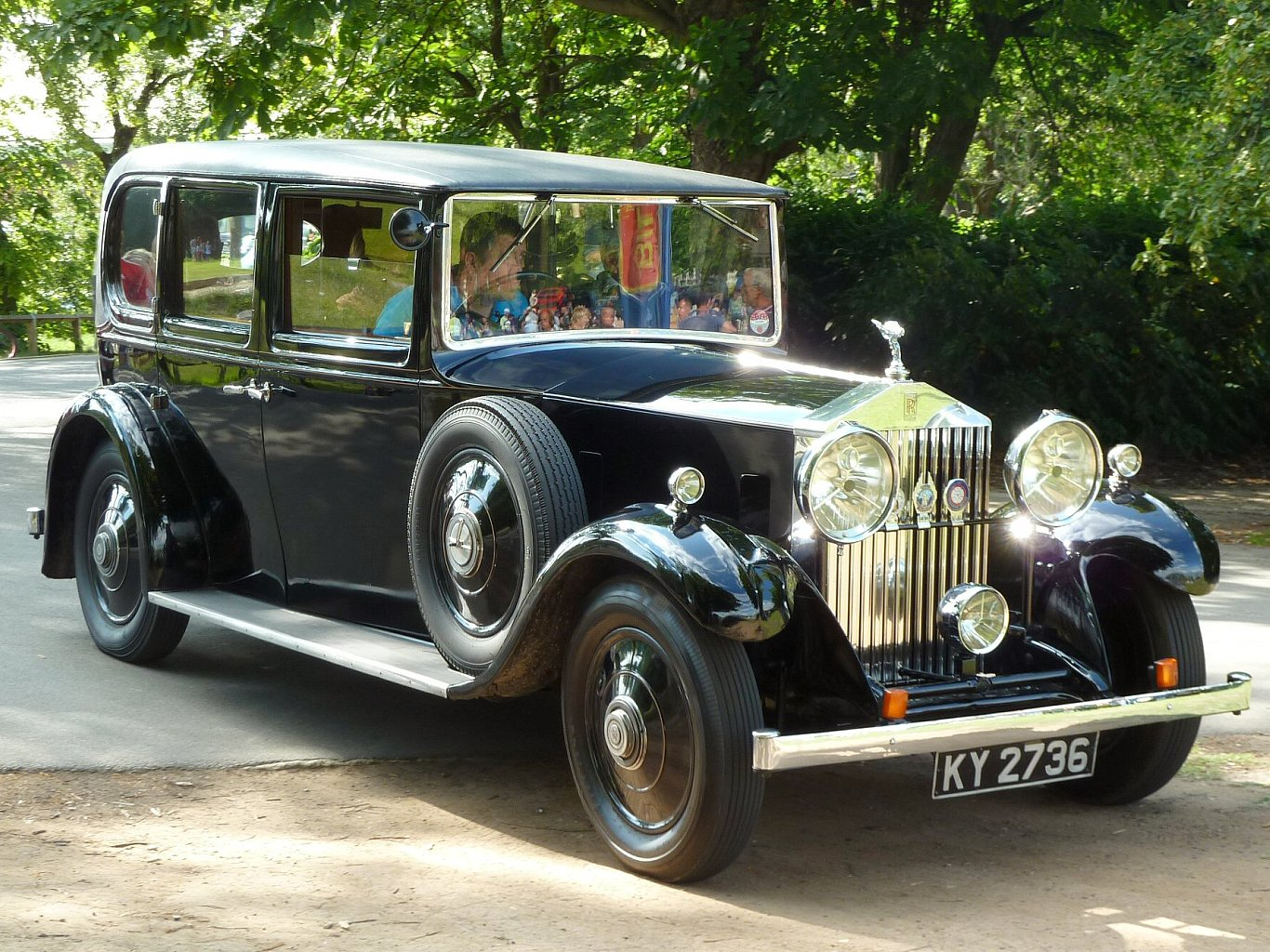
- 1932 Rolls-Royce 20/25 Rippon Limousine

Overview
- Manufacturer: Rolls-Royce Ltd
- Production: 1929–1936; 3,827 made

Body and chassis
- Body style: dependent on coachbuilder

Powertrain
- Engine: 3669 cc
- Transmission: 4-speed manual

Dimensions
- Wheelbase: 3.27 metres (128.7 in); 3.35 metres (131.9 in) from 1930
- Length: 4.57 metres (179.9 in)

Chronology
- Predecessor: Twenty
- Successor: 25/30

The Rolls-Royce 20/25 is the second of Rolls-Royce Limited's inter-war entry-level models. Built between 1929 and 1936, it was very popular, becoming the most successful selling inter-war Rolls-Royce. Its success enabled Rolls-Royce to survive the Great Depression, and remain one of World's great brands. 3,827 20/25s were produced, and more than 70% of these survive in use.

== Origin ==
The 20/25 replaced the highly successful 20 hp Rolls-Royce Twenty that had been introduced in 1922. The target market for the 20/25 was the same as the Twenty – the luxury, owner driver market. The project to develop the next generation 20 hp was code named Goshawk. The goal for the new model was to increase power and performance. This was achieved by increasing the bore from 3.00 to 3.25 in (76.2 to 82.6 mm). The stroke was unchanged at 4.5 in (114.3 mm). This increased capacity by 17%, from 191 to 224 cu in (3,128 to 3,675 cc), and raised the RAC rating up to 25.4 hp.

The new 20/25 model was debuted at the 1929 Olympia Motor Show. It proved very popular, and became Rolls-Royce's greatest inter-war success. 3,827 were 20/25 hp made – more than twice as many as its larger sibling the Phantom II. The 20/25's popularity saved Rolls-Royce in the 1930s. In 1936 the 20/25 model was replaced by the 25/30, in which the bore was further increased to 3.5 in (88.9 mm). In 1938 the 25/30 was given a new chassis with independent front suspension, and became the Wraith.

The 20/25 also enabled Rolls-Royce to quickly capitalise on its 1931 acquisition of Bentley Motors Ltd. As part of integrating its acquisition, Rolls-Royce management discontinued the Bentley 8 Litre car due to the perceived market overlap with the Phantom II. This meant the acquisition brought with it the Bentley brand; debt; engineers; and manufacturing employees, but no car to produce. They quickly decided to create a new Bentley using the 20/25 engine with some adaptations, and a chassis that had been developed for a 2¾ litre Rolls-Royce that had been intended as an economy version of the 20/25 but had been cancelled. This formed the basis of the first "Derby Bentley" – the Bentley 3½ litre. The model was very successful; became known as the "Silent Sports Car"; and was another major contribution of the 20/25 to the success of Rolls-Royce.

== Engineering ==
The general technical specification of the 20/25 are:

Engine: inline 6-cylinder, overhead pushrod operated valve engine with 3,699 cc (226 cu in) capacity. Separate cast iron block and aluminium crankcase with detachable cast iron 6-plug head. It has an 82 mm (3.2 in) bore with a 114 mm (4.5 in) stroke. 7-bearing crankshaft with vibration damper. Pressure fed lubrication with relief valve feeding rocker shaft and timing gears.

Ignition System: independent coil and standby magneto systems. 12V system 50 Amp-hours battery. Centrifugal advance with hand override. Distributor gap 0.017–0.021 in (0.4–0.5 mm)

Cooling System: The famous Rolls-Royce radiator with triangular top with vertical louvres, the angle of which can be adjusted to control engine cooling. In early models, the radiator shutters is operated manually via a lever on the dashboard. Cars from 1931 onward have an automatic control via a thermostat. Engine driven centrifugal pump and belt-driven fan.

Carburation: A single Rolls-Royce two-jet type with starting carburettor, automatic air valve and steering column control.

Fuel: 14 imp gal (64 L) rear tank, increased to 18 imp gal (82 L) from 1932 onward. "Autovac" vacuum-fed fuel pump. Electric fuel gauge from 1933 onward.

Transmission: four-speed gearbox. Gearboxes from 1932 onward have synchromesh in third and top gears. Right hand gear change. Single dry plate clutch. Open drive propeller shaft.

Suspension: Semi-elliptic leaf springs front and rear. Hydraulic dampers.

Brakes: Internal expanding four-wheel operation with independent handbrake on the rear wheels. Mechanical servo motor driven from the gearbox.

Chassis lubrication: "One-Shot" Bijur centralised chassis lubrication system.

Steering: Worm and nut. (1936: Marles cam and roller – GTK 42)

== Improvements made during production run ==
Rolls-Royce continued to enhance the 20/25 engineering during its production run. There were 36 technical releases or series. The key enhancements by year are:

1930

- Flexible engine suspension
- 5.25:1 compression ratio
- Longer wheelbase – 11 ft 0 in, 3,355 mm

1931

- Reserve petrol supply
- Anti-splash radiator cap

1932

- Completely centralised chassis lubrication system
- Diamond engine mounting
- New thin-rimmed steering wheel
- Improved engine performance, 5.75:1 compression ratio
- High-lift camshaft
- Double-acting hydraulic shock dampers
- Larger radiator – 4 in (100 mm) deeper
- "Staybrite" radiator shell
- Thermostatically controlled shutters
- Low-inertia spring-drive crankshaft vibration damper
- Two-rate charging system
- Electric fuel gauge
- Synchromesh on third and top gears

1933

- Nitralloy crankshaft
- Three-rate charging system
- Silent second gear

1934

- Single-jet expanding carburetor
- Air silencer
- Needle-bearing propeller shaft
- Ride Control
- DWS permanent jacks

1935

- Flexible engine mounting
- Voltage-controlled generator

1936

- Borg & Beck clutch
- Hypoid rear axle
- Marles cam and roller steering

== Performance ==
Based on a test published in Autocar in June 1935 of a Hooper closed-coupled Sports Saloon:

Acceleration

- From rest to 50 mph (80 km/h) through gears in 21.0 sec
- From rest to 60 mph (97 km/h) through gears in 31.4 sec

Best timed speed: 76.27 mph (122.7 km/h)

Maximum speeds in gears:

- 1st – 18 mph (29 km/h)
- 2nd – 32 mph (51 km/h)
- 3rd – 53 mph (85 km/h)
- 4th – 76 mph (122 km/h)

Petrol Consumption: driven hard – 14 mpg_{‑imp} (20 L/100 km; 12 mpg_{‑US})

The 20/25 engine and chassis were designed for owner drivers: ideally to be fitted with a saloon or coupé body, such as that in the 1935 Autocar test. However, many 20/25's were fitted with larger and heavier limousine bodies, which impaired their performance.

== Body ==
Rolls-Royce made only the chassis and mechanical parts. The body was made and fitted by a coachbuilder chosen by the owner. Among the most respected coachbuilders who produced bodies for Rolls-Royce cars are Park Ward, Thrupp & Maberly, Mulliner, Carlton and Hooper.

== Today ==
Today 20/25s are significantly less expensive than the inter-war large horsepower Rolls-Royces and Bentleys, with a price typically between half or one-fifth of that of its larger-horsepower contemporary, the Phantom II.

Driving – The driving experience was received positively in 1935. The steering is reasonably high-geared and accurate, so little turning of the wheel is required. On country road cruising at 40–50 mph (65–80 km/h), all but the heaviest bodied cars are unstressed. Many owners have added an overdrive to their 20/25, which enables a car to cruise at highway speeds of 50–65 mph (80–105 km/h).

Maintenance – Inter-war Rolls-Royces had a highly durable design. 3,827 20/25s were produced, and over 70% were still on the road as of 2009. The 20/25 is relatively easy to maintain for someone with general automotive experience. Basic parts are still readily available through speciality suppliers. In Europe, the US, and Australia, a network of restoration and repair shops exist that are experienced in inter-war Rolls-Royce and Bentley cars, although the number of quality shops is declining as a generation of experienced specialist mechanics retires. Many 20/25 owners maintain their car themselves as a hobby project. These owners are supported by Rolls-Royce car clubs, which host on-line forums and regular in-person meetings for members to assist each other on various types of repairs and restorations.

Geographic Location – Originally, 93% of new 20/25's were sold within the UK. Due to their global popularity as a drivable, inter-war motor car, they have been re-sold throughout the World. Today only 38% of the surviving cars remain in the UK. There are 20/25s in more than 50 countries.

== Film appearances ==
The Rolls-Royce 20/25 hp is featured in films such as; The League of Gentlemen (1959), Father Came Too! (1963), The Brides of Fu Manchu (1966), To Be or Not To Be (1983), and Indiana Jones and the Last Crusade (1989) (misidentified as a Phantom II).

A 1934 Mulliner-bodied car, chassis number GRC33, registration mark BMG 443, was used many times by the BBC and some Hollywood and British based movie makers. Its appearances include:

To the Manor Born – A Rolls-Royce associated with Audrey appears throughout the series.

Dad's Army – episode The Captain's Car, in which the platoon stole it by accident from the Mayor and camouflaged it.

Secret Ceremony – A 1968 British drama horror film by Universal Pictures starring Elizabeth Taylor, Mia Farrow, and Robert Mitchum

Au Pair Girls – A 1972 British sex comedy film starring John Le Mesurier, Richard O'Sullivan, Trevor Bannister, and Harold Bennet

== Gallery ==
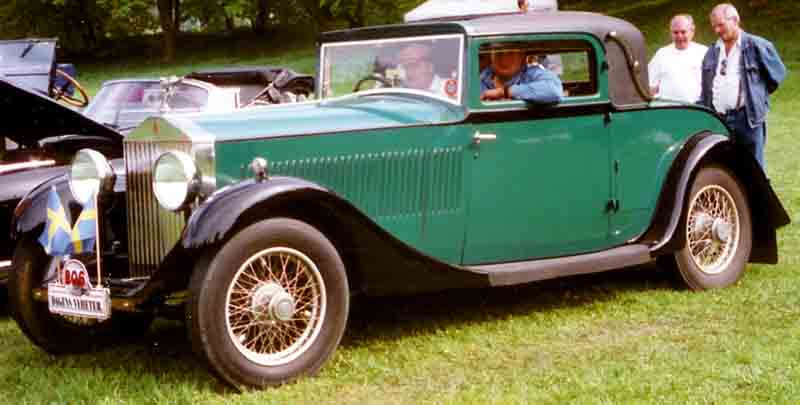
Rolls-Royce 20/25 Fixed Head Coupé 1932

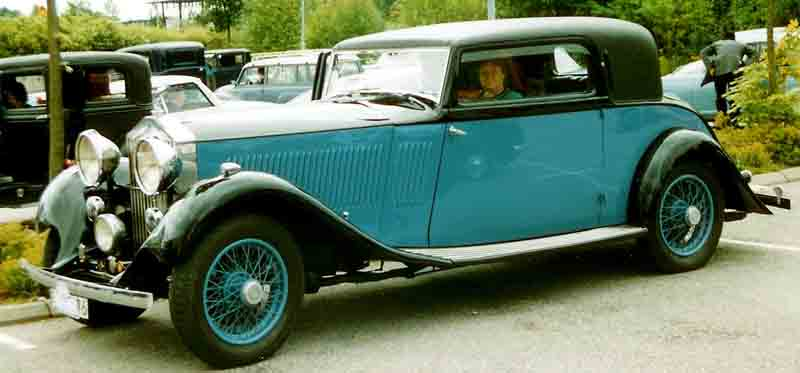
Rolls-Royce 20/25 Fixed Head Coupé 1933

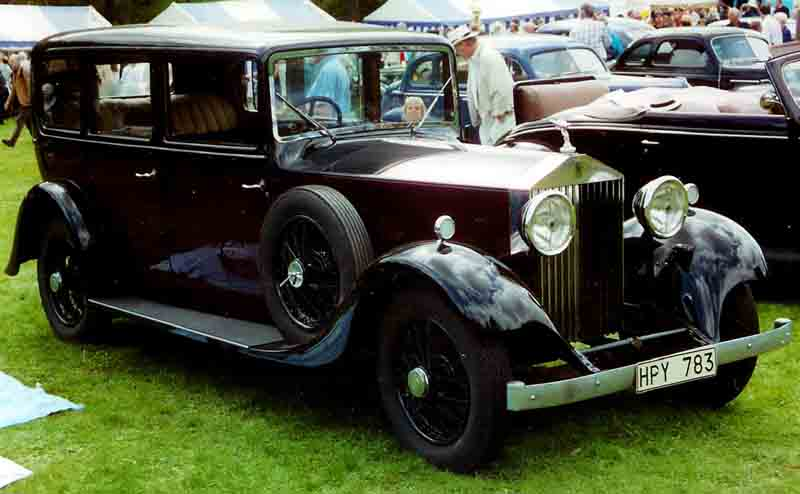
Rolls-Royce 20/25 Limousine 1933

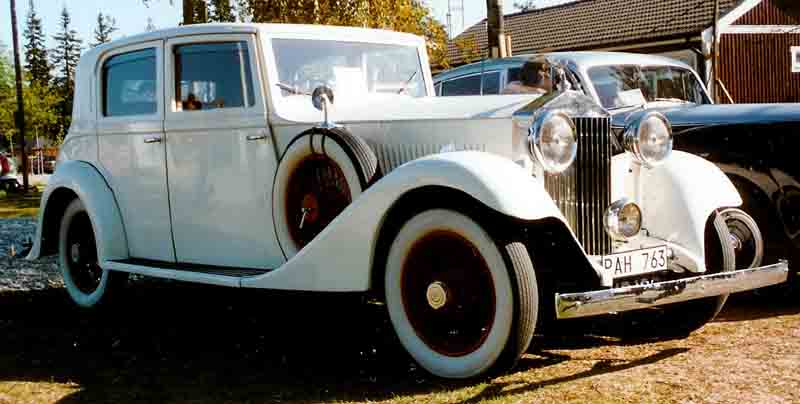
Rolls-Royce 20/25 Saloon 1933

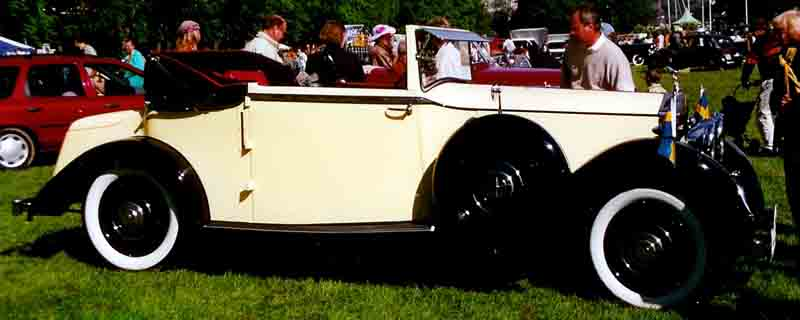
Rolls-Royce 20/25 Drophead Coupé 1934

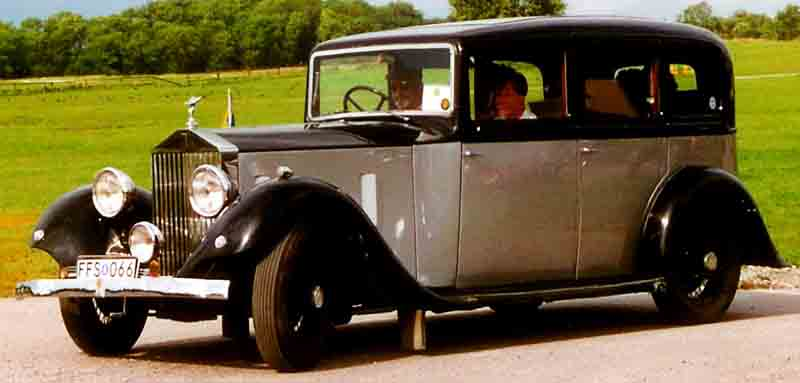
Rolls-Royce 20/25 Limousine 1935

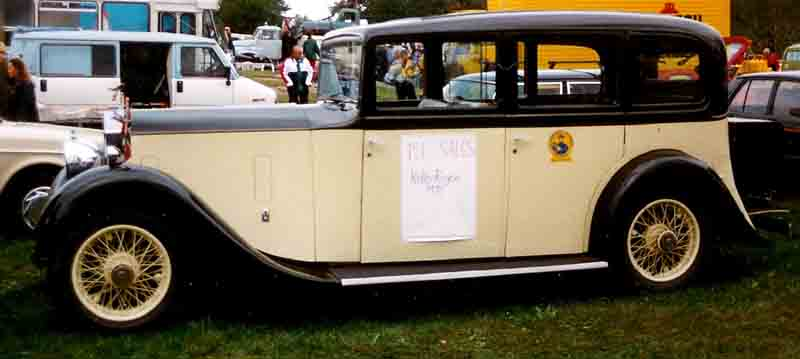
Rolls-Royce 20/25 Limousine 1935

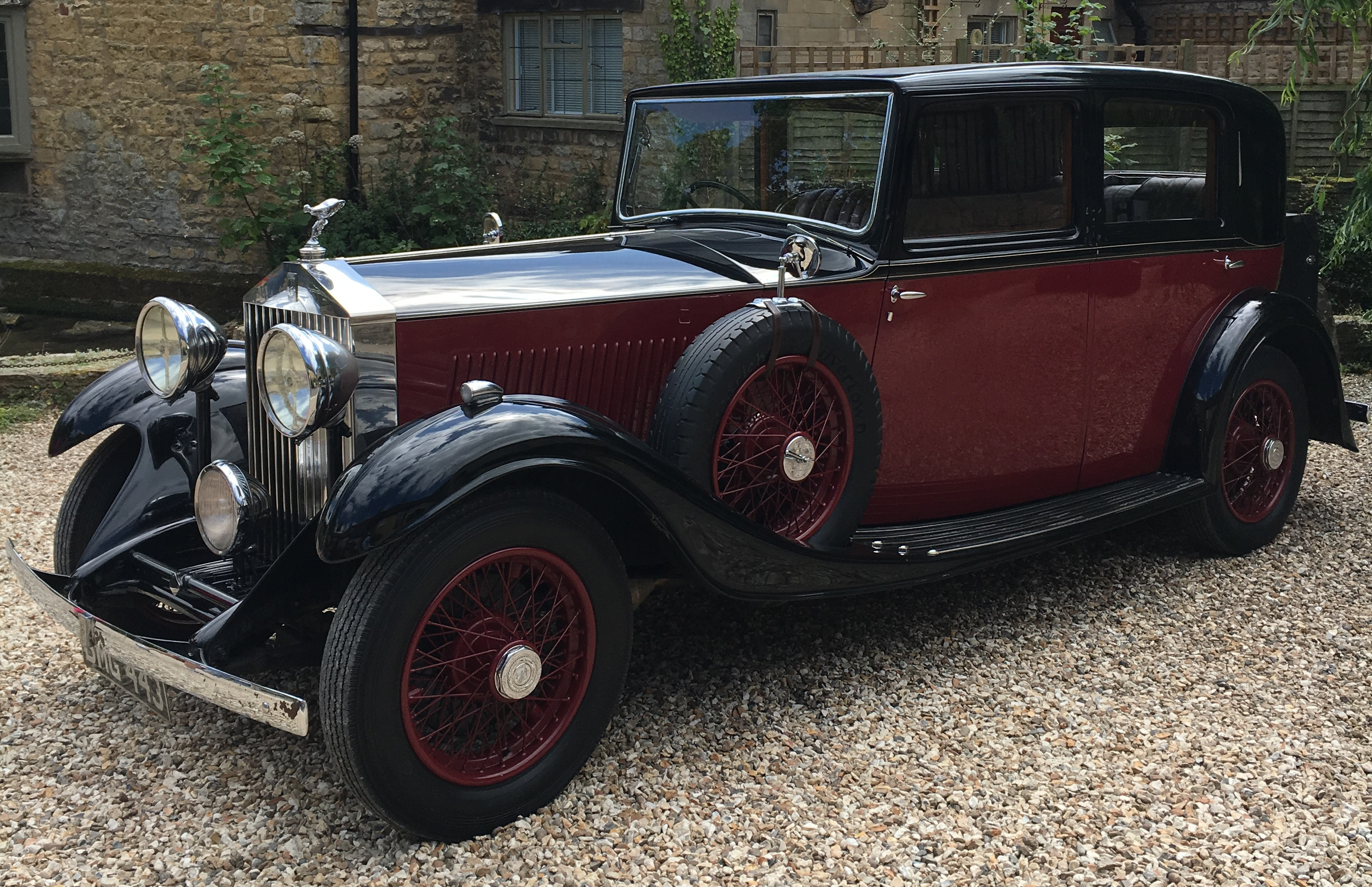
Rolls-Royce 20/25 HJ Mulliner Limousine 1934

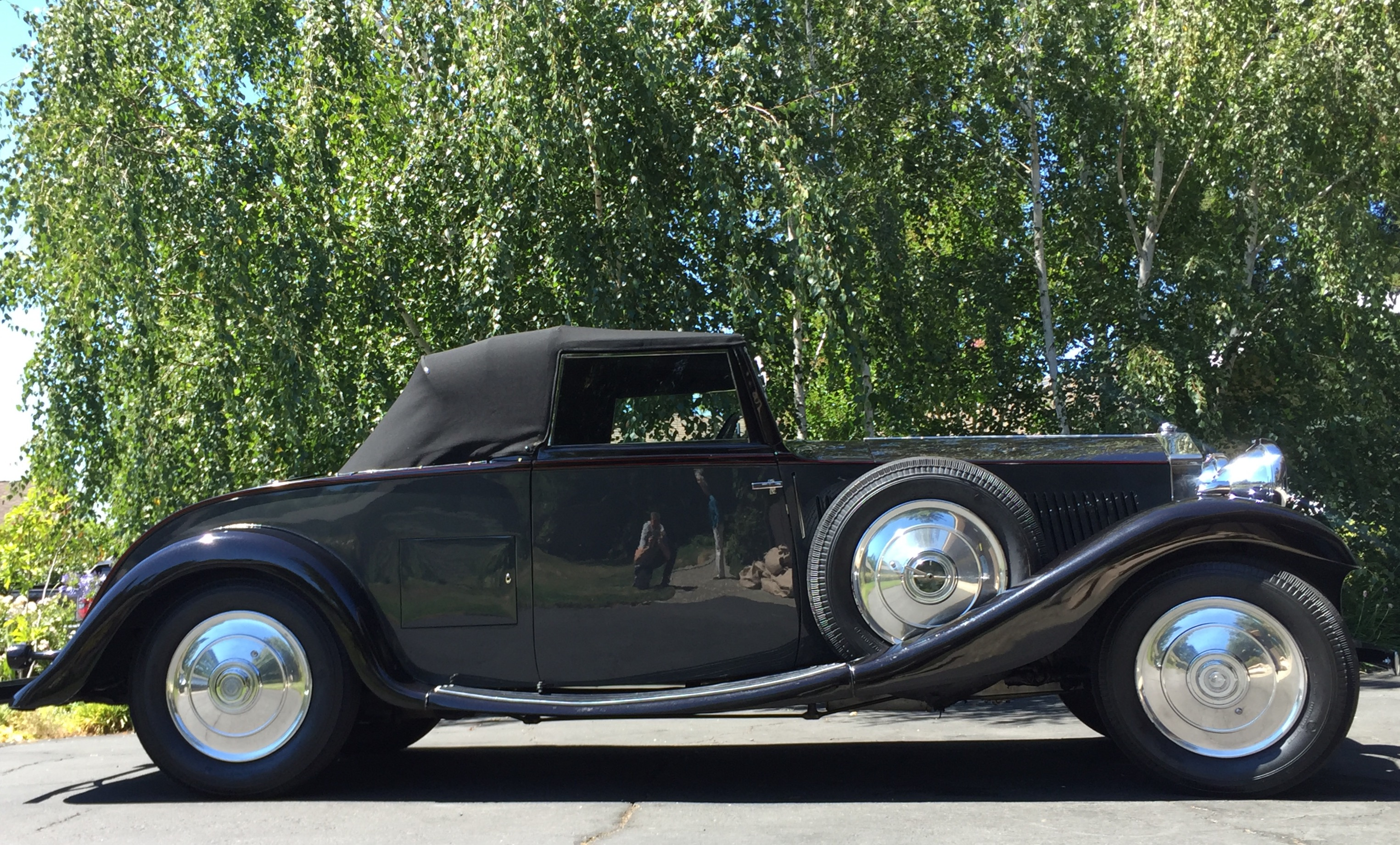
20/25 Carlton Drophead Coupé 1933
