= William B. Hurlbut =

American biologist

William B. Hurlbut is an adjunct professor in the Department of Neurobiology at Stanford University Medical Center. Born in 1945 in St. Helena, California, he grew up in Bronxville, New York.

After completing his undergraduate studies at Stanford University in 1968, Hurlbut went on to pursue medical training and earned his medical degree in 1974, also from Stanford University. Following his medical education, he embarked on postdoctoral studies focused on theology and medical ethics.

During his postdoctoral studies, Hurlbut had the opportunity to study under the guidance of prominent figures in the field. He worked with Robert Hamerton-Kelly, who served as the dean of the chapel at Stanford, and later studied with the Reverend Louis Bouyer of the Institut Catholique de Paris.

In addition to teaching at Stanford, Hurlbut served for eight years on the President's Council on Bioethics from 2001 to 2009, and is currently a senior fellow at the Trinity Forum.

== Career ==
His primary areas of interest involve the ethical issues associated with advancing biomedical technology, the biological basis of moral awareness, and the integration of theology and philosophy of biology. In the Program in Human Biology, he has taught courses on biomedical ethics, including Biology, Technology, and Human Life and Social and Ethical Issues in the Neurosciences. Additionally, he has worked with NASA on projects in astrobiology. Since 1998, Hurlbut has been a member of the Chemical and Biological Warfare working group at the Stanford University Center for International Security and Cooperation. He is also a senior fellow at The Trinity Forum.

Hurlbut is noted for his advocacy of Altered Nuclear Transfer (ANT), a scientific method of obtaining pluripotent stem cells without the creation and destruction of human embryos, and has spoken on the intrinsic dignity of human life, including the moral value of the human embryo.

He attended the Beyond Belief symposium in November 2006. In mid-2007, Hurlbut was the guest of the BBC World Service Radio programme, The Interview.

In 2009, commentary from Hurlbut was featured in the futurist documentary, Transcendent Man. In 2010, Hurlbut was featured in the award-winning documentary film, The Human Experience.
