= Barry Ptolemy =

American film director, producer and writer (born 1969)

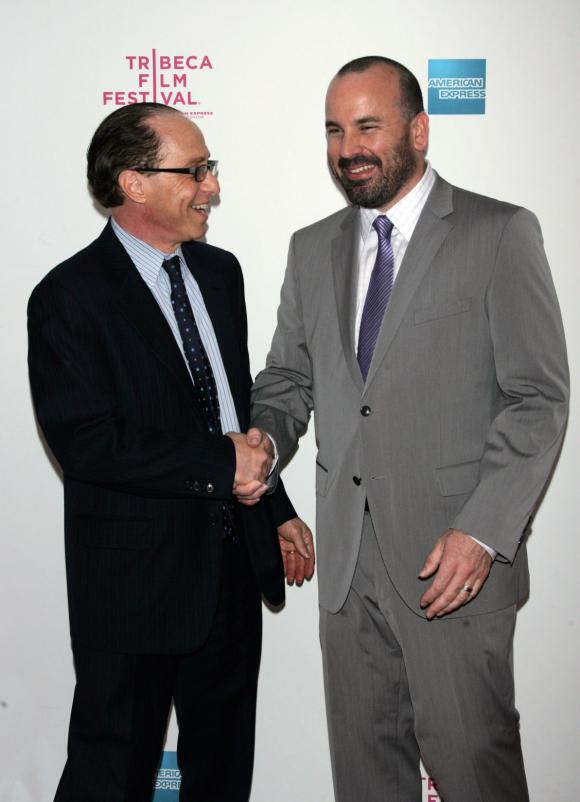
- Ray Kurzweil (left) greets Ptolemy at the premiere of Transcendent Man.
- Born: Robert Barry Ptolemy; January 24, 1969 (age 56); Los Angeles, U.S.
- Occupation(s): Film director, screenwriter & producer
- Partner: Felicia Ptolemy (2005-present)

Robert Barry Ptolemy (born 1969) is an American film director, producer and writer. Ptolemy directed Transcendent Man (2009), a documentary film about futurist and inventor Ray Kurzweil.

== Life ==
Ptolemy was born in Los Angeles, California. His father introduced him to computers at an early age, giving him a lifelong interest in technology. At the age of 12, Ptolemy worked with Steven Spielberg on the set of E.T. the Extra-Terrestrial (1982) as an animal wrangler. Inspired by working with Spielberg the next year in 1983 Ptolemy directed and produced his first short film The Holograph which won first place in a regional arts festival. He attended USC School of Cinematic Arts in 1990 and shortly after started a production company that produced TV commercials and show pilots.

== Career ==
In 2006, Ptolemy read Kurzweil's The Singularity Is Near and was inspired to make the film, Transcendent Man in February 2007. Along with his wife Felicia, Ptolemy followed Kurzweil around the world to roughly 25 cities in five countries while documenting his ideas about the concept of the singularity. After working closely together, Ptolemy considers Kurzweil a friend. In 2010, Ptolemy directed the "We Are The World for Haiti" video which premiered during the opening ceremonies for the 2010 Winter Olympics with Quincy Jones and Lionel Richie.

In an interview with High School Rejects, Ptolemy said his next project would be a science fiction film.

As of this writing Ptolemy is scheduled to produce and appear in a panel discussion called Transcendent Man LIVE with Ray Kurzweil, Steve Wozniak, Deepak Chopra, Dean Kamen, Michio Kaku, Tan Le with special appearances by Vice President Al Gore, Bill Maher, Quincy Jones and Elon Musk. The event will be broadcast to 500 theaters nationwide as a Fathom Event live from the Lincoln Center in New York City on August 3, 2011. Ptolemy has been quoted as saying he assembled this panel to "start a grand discussion about the future."

== Filmography ==
- The Catch (2000) – Director/Producer/Screenplay
- Transcendent Man (2009) – Director/Producer
- Transcendent Man LIVE! (2011) – Executive Producer
- The Future of Us – starring Jason Silva (2014) Executive Producer
