= Rolls-Royce 25/30 =

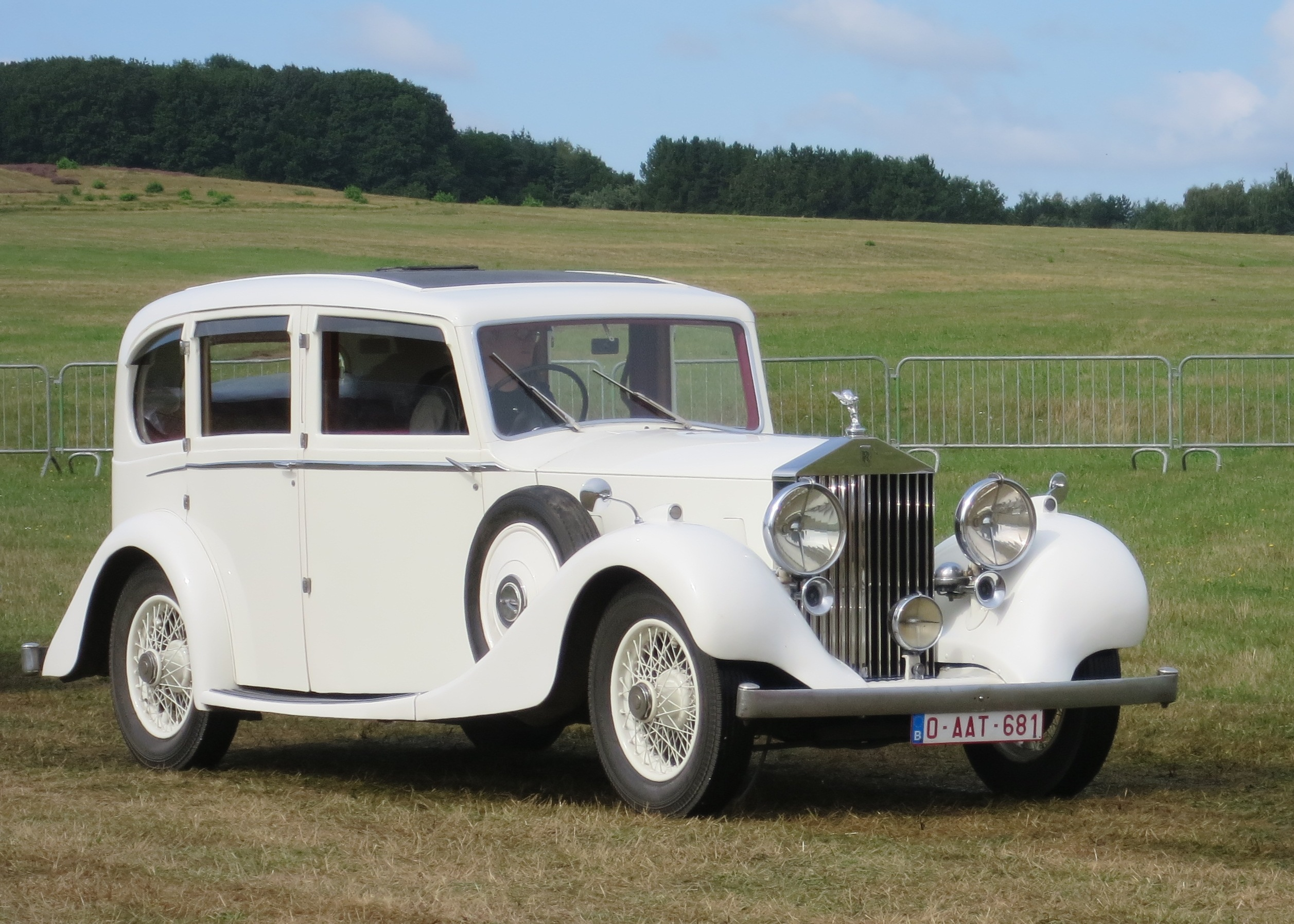
- 1937 Rolls-Royce 25/30 Saloon

Overview
- Manufacturer: Rolls-Royce Ltd
- Production: 1936–1938; 1201 made

Powertrain
- Engine: 4257 cc
- Transmission: 4-speed manual

Dimensions
- Wheelbase: 132 inches (3.4 m)

Chronology
- Predecessor: 20/25
- Successor: Wraith

The Rolls-Royce 25/30 is an updated version of the 20/25 built between 1936 and 1938 with a larger engine. This provided more power, as over-large bodies had often been fitted to the earlier model, leading to complaints about its performance.

== Engineering ==
The in-line 6-cylinder, overhead-valve 25/30 hp engine is similar to that used in the 20/25 but increased in capacity to 4,257 cc (259.8 cu in) by increasing the bore from 3.25 inches (8.3 cm) to 3.5 inches (8.9 cm), with the stroke remaining at 4.5 inches (114.3 mm). The compression ratio is 6:1. A single proprietary Stromberg downdraught carburettor replaced the Rolls-Royce one, and magneto ignition was no longer fitted, but a standby coil was provided. The four-speed gearbox is mounted in unit with the engine, and a traditional right-hand change used. Synchromesh is fitted to third and top gears.

The riveted chassis has rigid front and rear axles suspended by half-elliptic springs with hydraulic dampers. Braking is on all four wheels assisted by a mechanical servo, famously under licence of Hispano-Suiza. Separate rear brakes are fitted for the handbrake. The traditional Rolls-Royce radiator with triangular top was used with vertical louvres, the opening angle of which is controlled thermostatically to control engine cooling.

== Bodywork ==
Only the rolling chassis and mechanical parts were made by Rolls-Royce. The body was made and fitted by a coachbuilder selected by the owner. Some of the most famous coachbuilders who produced bodies for Rolls-Royce cars are Park Ward, Thrupp & Maberly, H. J. Mulliner & Co., Arthur Mulliner and Hooper.

== Movie appearances ==
This Rolls-Royce appears in films such as The Naked Truth (1957), Death on the Nile (1978), and several others. Although the sultan in Indiana Jones and the Last Crusade (1989) calls his car a Phantom II, the technical details he recites are those of the 25/30. However, the actual on-screen car was neither; it was a 1935 20/25.

== Gallery ==
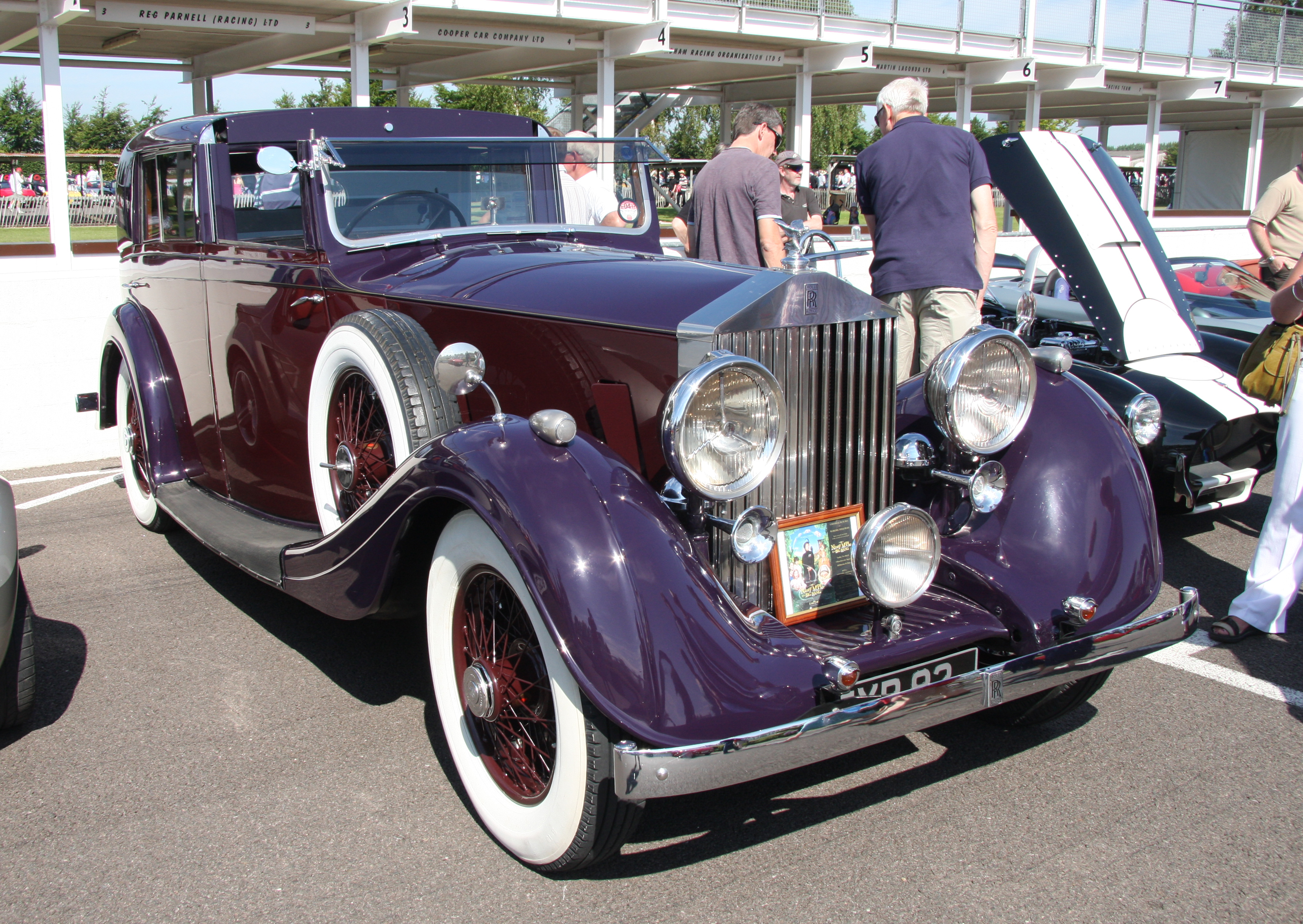
1936 Rolls-Royce 25/30 h.p. Sedanca de Ville Gurney Nutting. Chassis GGM6

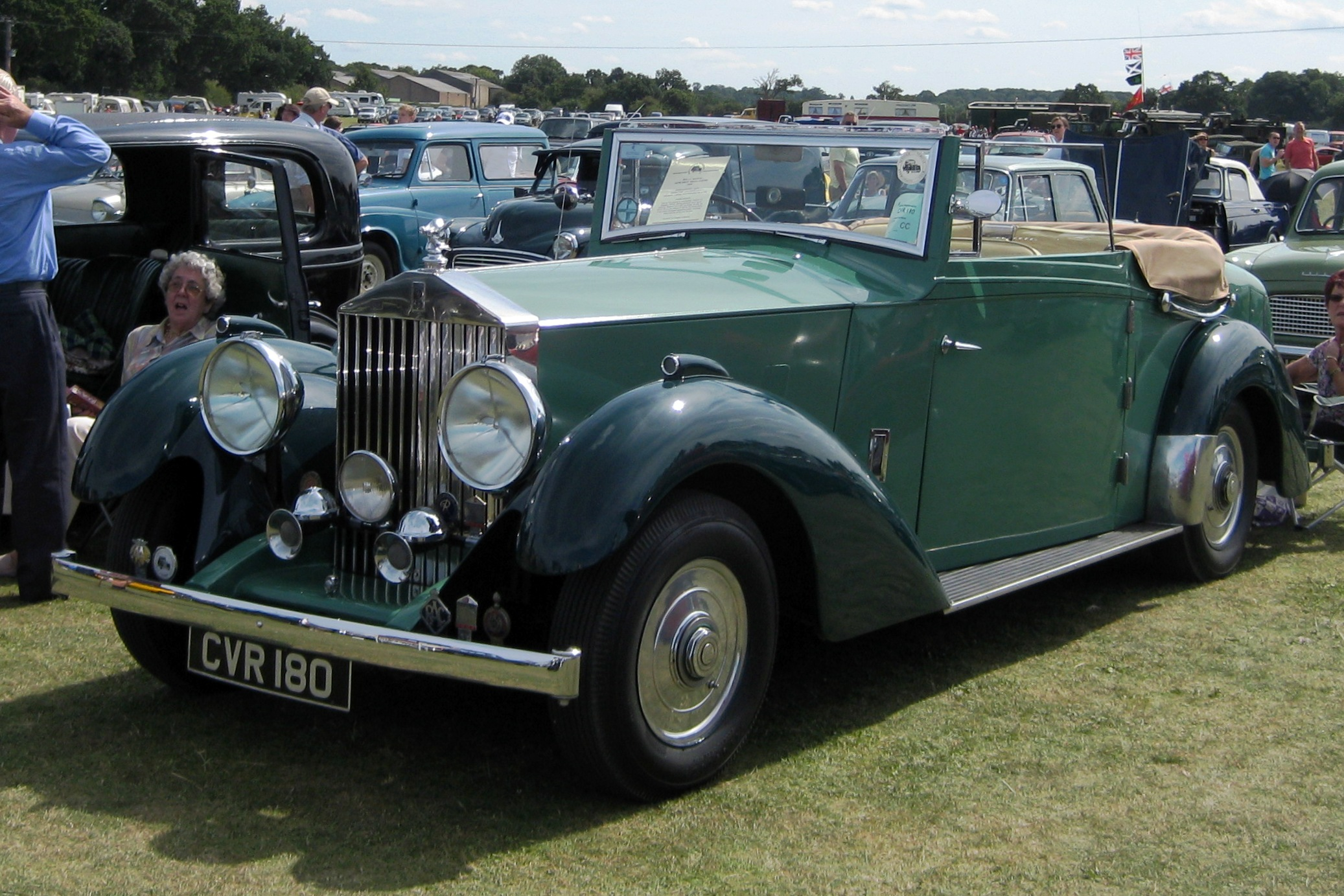
1936 Rolls-Royce 25-30 Drophead Coupe by Caffyns

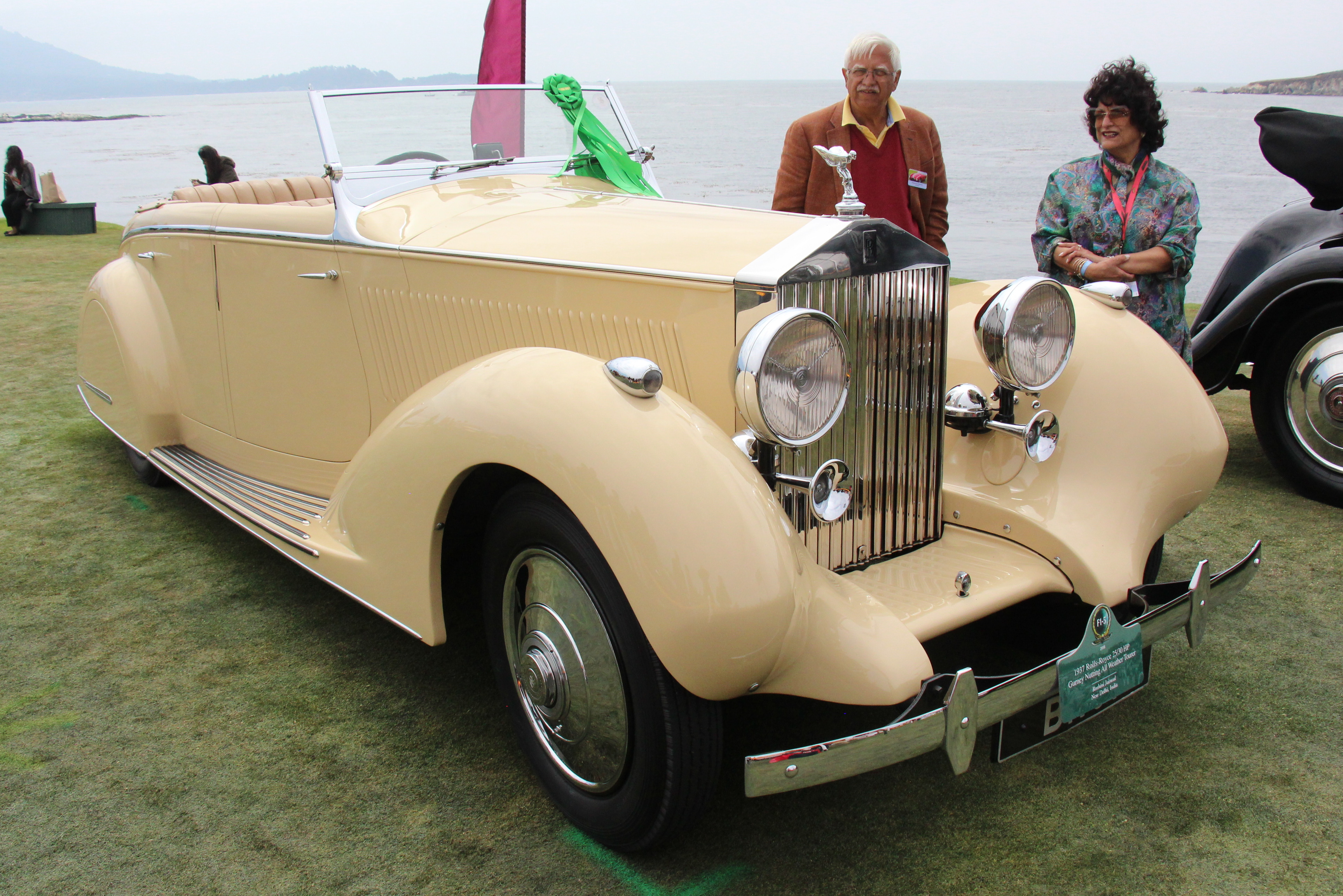
1937 Rolls Royce 25-30 Tourer by Gurney Nutting

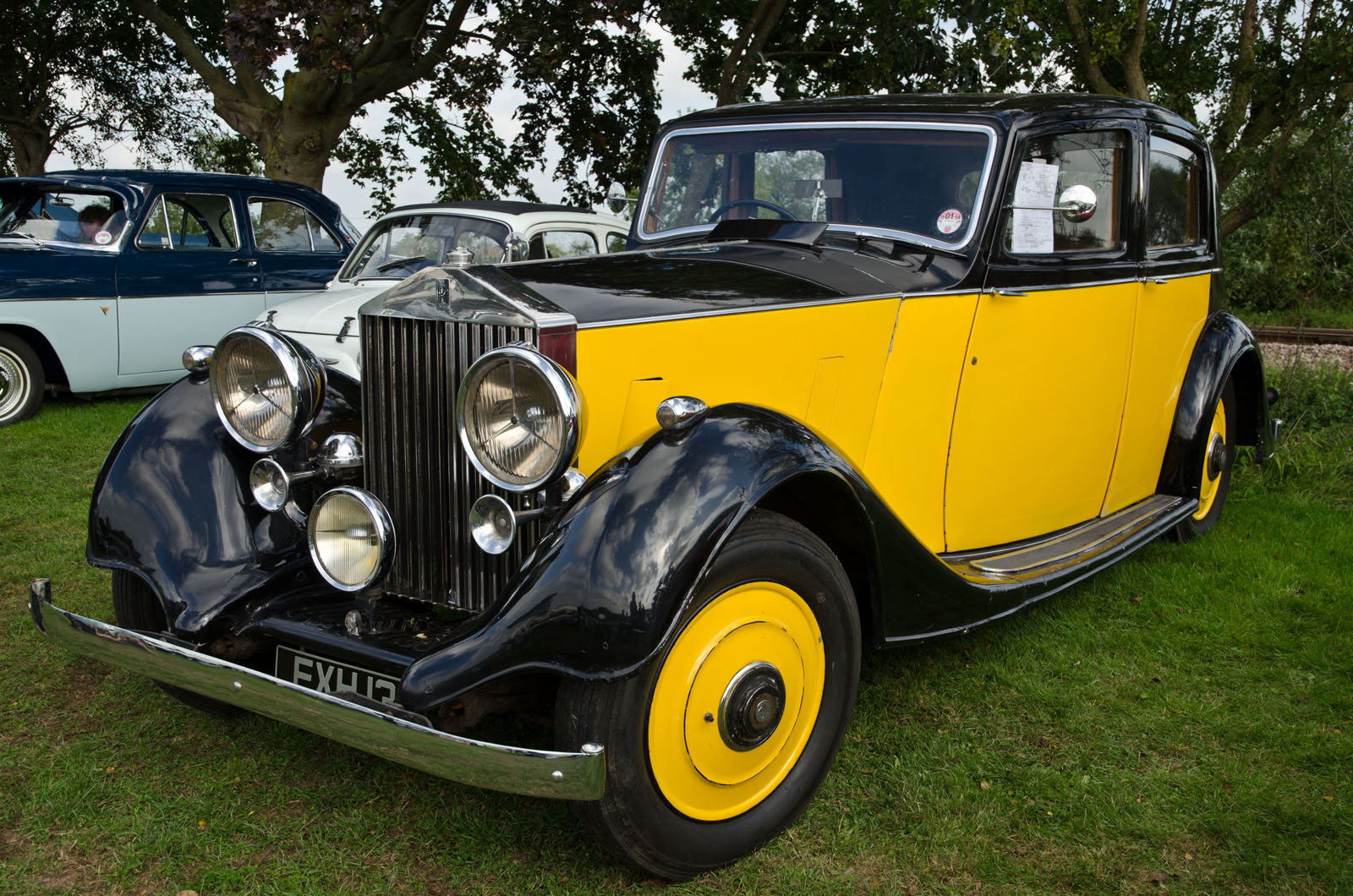
1938 Rolls Royce 25-30 Sports Saloon by Thrupp & Maberly

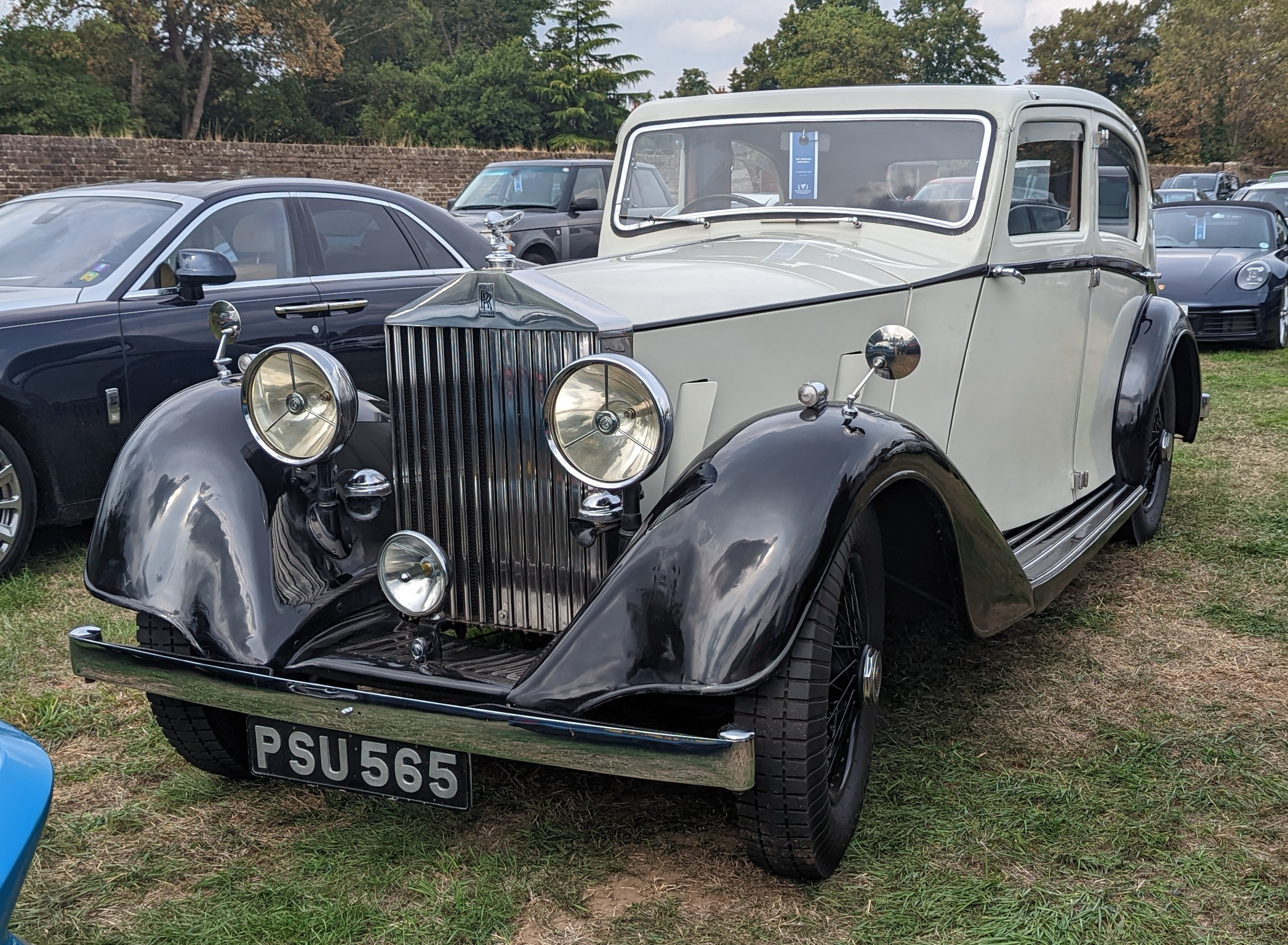
Rolls Royce 25/30

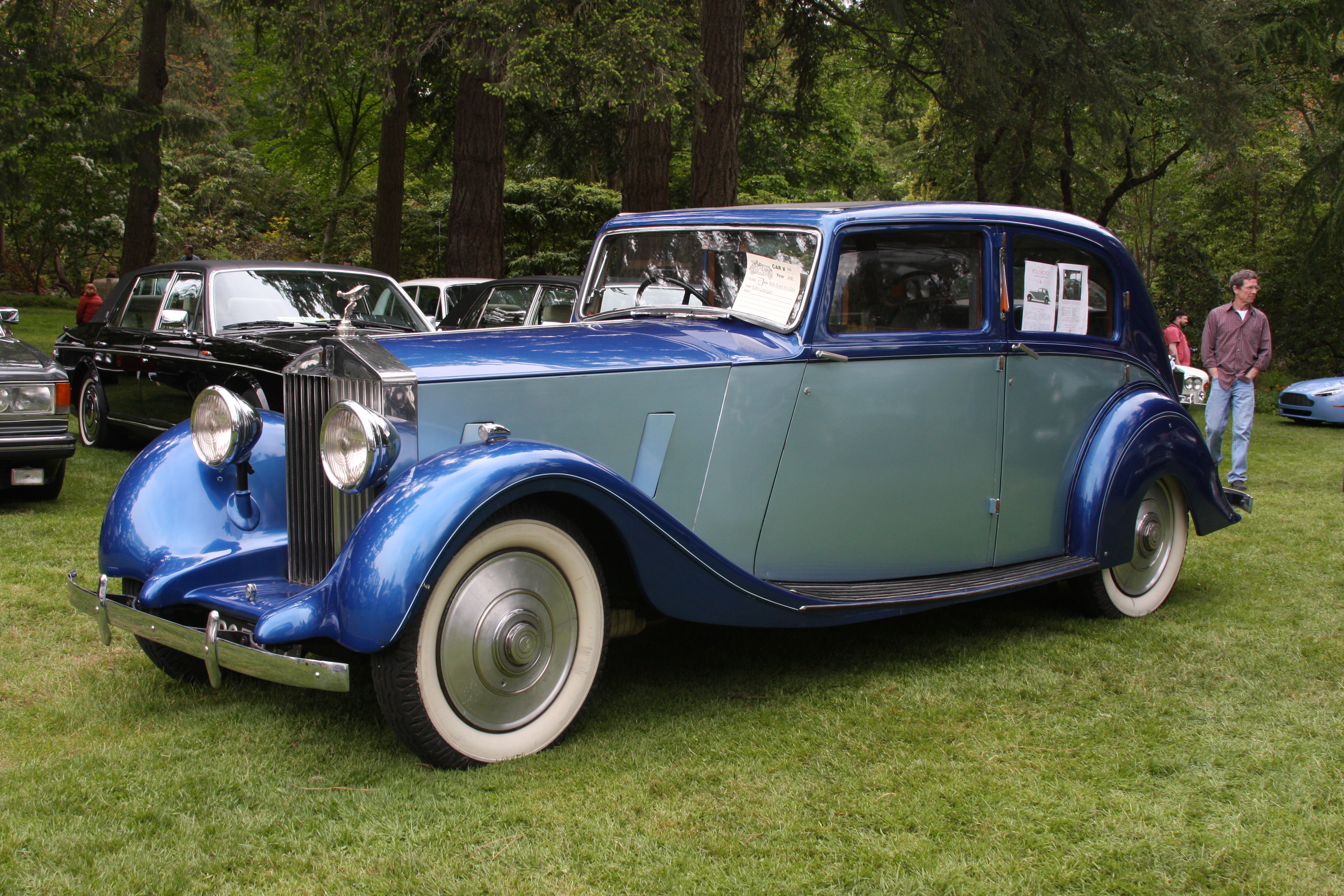
1936 Rolls Royce 25-30 Limousine

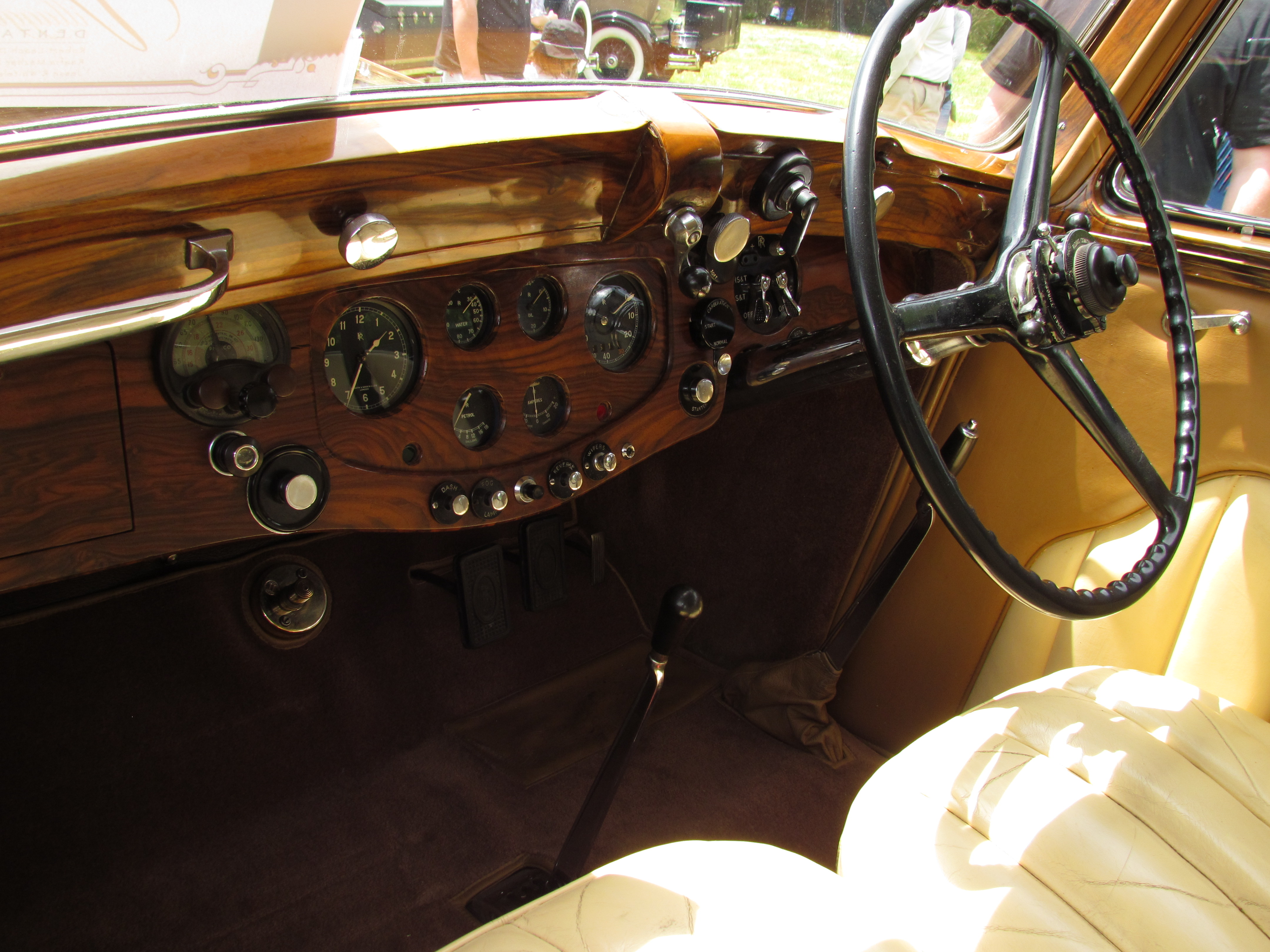
1937 Rolls Royce 25-30 James Young saloon interior
