= Rolls-Royce Twenty =

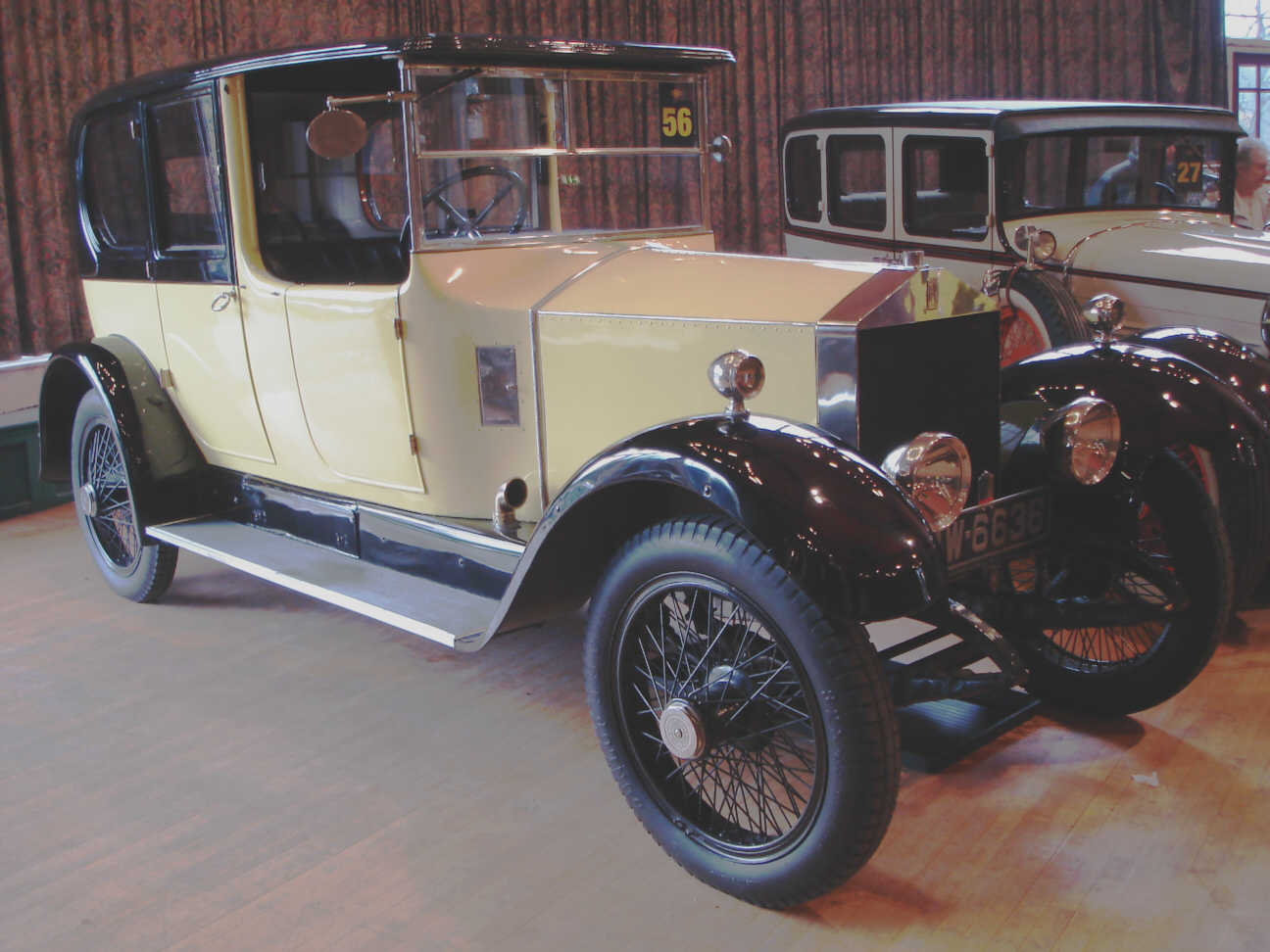

Overview
- Manufacturer: Rolls-Royce Ltd
- Production: 1922–1929; 2,940 made
- Designer: Sir Henry Royce

Body and chassis
- Body style: 4-door convertible 4-door sedan
- Layout: FR layout

Powertrain
- Engine: 3,127 cc (3.1 L) I6
- Transmission: 3-speed manual 4-speed manual

Dimensions
- Wheelbase: 3.275 metres (128.9 in)
- Length: 4.52 metres (178.0 in)

Chronology
- Successor: 20/25

The Rolls-Royce Twenty was Rolls-Royce's "small car" for the 1920s, produced from 1922 to 1929 alongside the 40/50 Silver Ghost and the successor to the 40/50, the Phantom. It was intended to appeal to owner-drivers but many were sold to customers with chauffeurs.

== Engineering ==
A new inline-6 cylinder overhead valve engine was designed for the car of 3127 cc with a bore of 76 mm and stroke of 114 mm. Unlike the Silver Ghost engine, the cylinders were cast in one block and the cylinder head was detachable. Both coil and magneto ignition were fitted. The early cars had 3-speed manual gearboxes with the change lever in the centre of the car, but this changed in 1925 to a four-speed unit with traditional right-hand change. The power was transmitted to the rear axle via a standard propeller shaft with a universal joint at each end.

The substantial chassis had rigid front and rear axles suspended by half-elliptic springs, with braking initially only on the rear wheels. Four-wheel brakes with mechanical servo were introduced in 1925. The famous Rolls-Royce radiator with triangular top was fitted, and early examples had enamel-finished horizontal slats, later changing to a nickel finish and finally becoming vertical.

In 1920 a chassis cost £1100 with, typically, a complete tourer-bodied car costing around £1600. With coachwork to the factory recommended weight the car could reach 60 mph (97 km/h), but many owners had large limousine bodies fitted, with the inevitable detrimental effect on performance.

== Bodywork ==
Only the chassis and mechanical parts were made by Rolls-Royce. The body was made and fitted by a coachbuilder selected by the owner. Some of the most famous coachbuilders who produced bodies for Rolls-Royce cars are Barker, Park Ward, Thrupp & Maberly, Mulliner and Hooper.

A torque tube is not used to transmit the power to the rear axle - this was the case with the 40/50 (Silver Ghost) chassis. In the case of the venerable 20 hp, the power was transmitted through the medium of a standard propeller shaft connected by a universal joint at each end.

== Movie appearances ==
The Battle of the Sexes (1959), The Abominable Dr. Phibes (1971), Candleshoe (1977), etc.

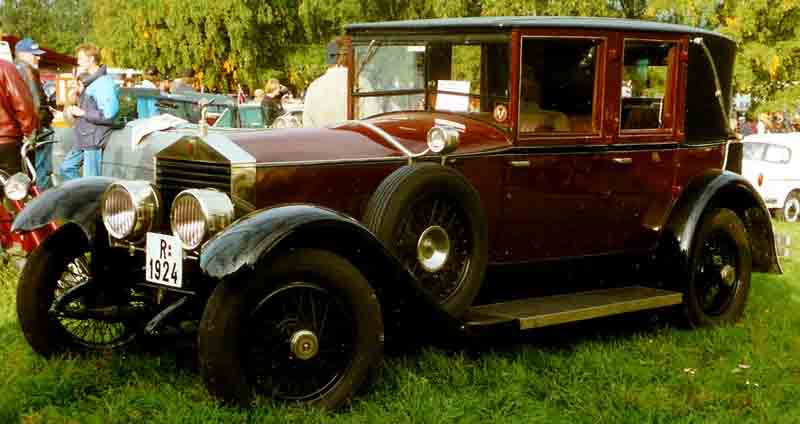
Rolls-Royce Twenty 1924

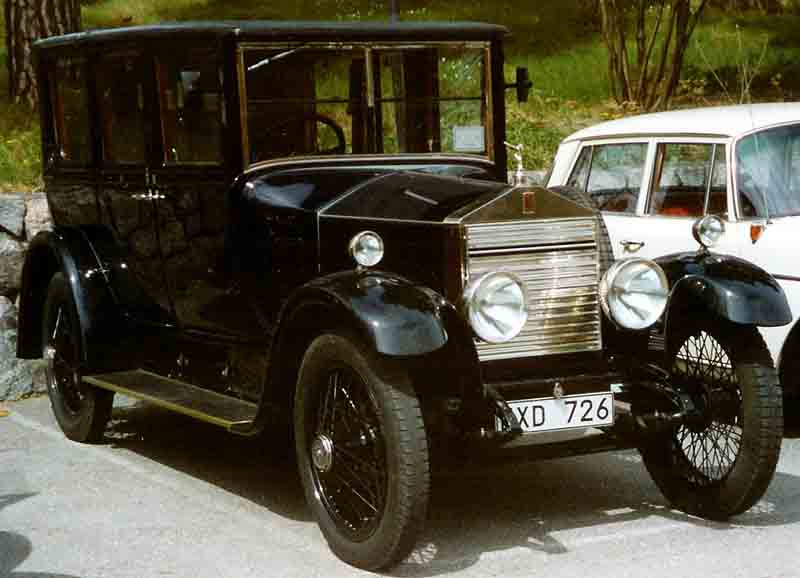
Rolls-Royce Twenty Landaulette 1925

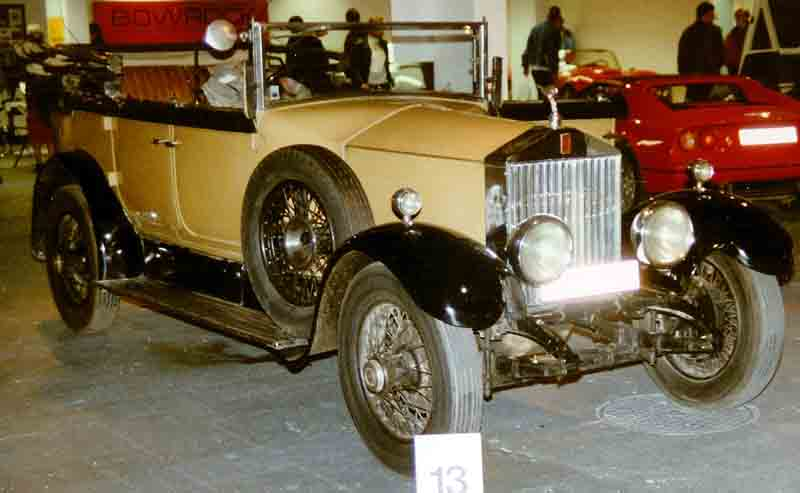
Rolls-Royce Twenty

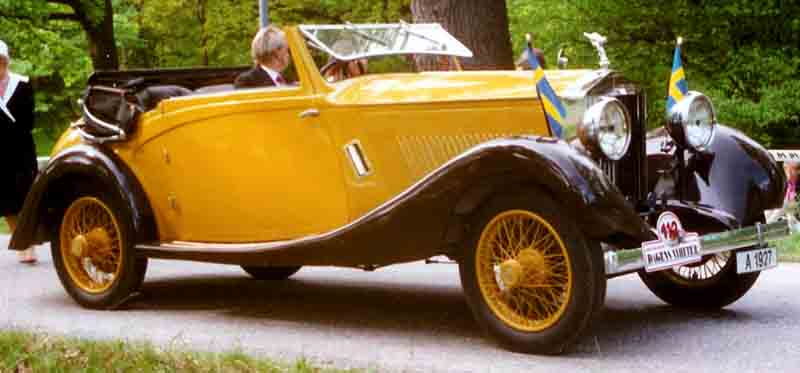
Rolls-Royce Twenty Drophead Coupé 1927

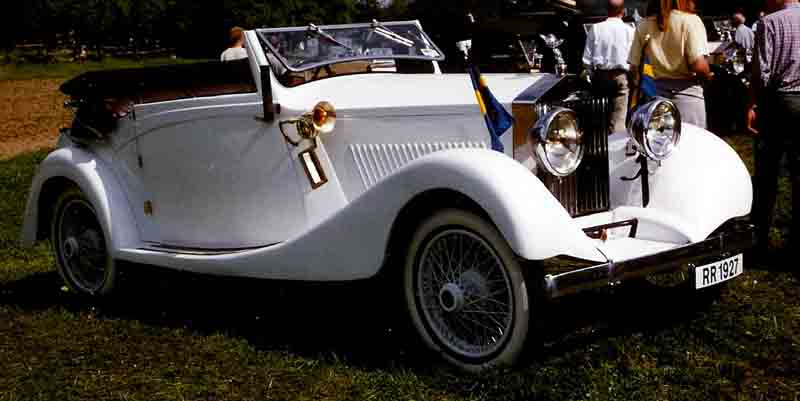
Rolls-Royce Twenty Drophead Coupé 1927

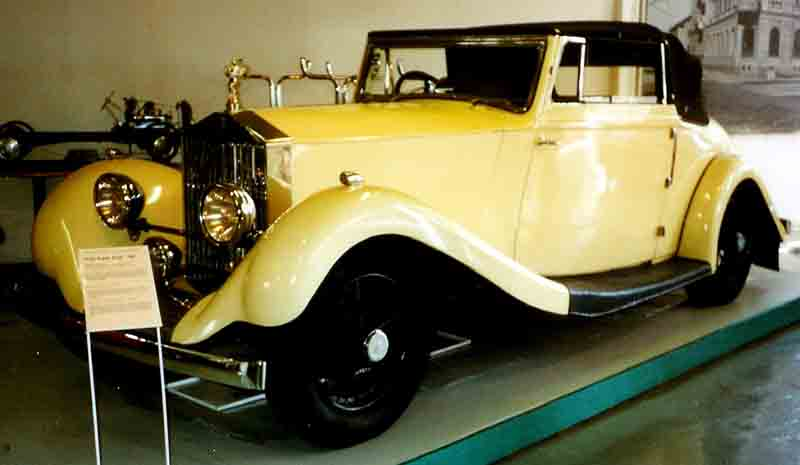
Rolls-Royce Twenty Drophead Coupé 1927
