= Rolls-Royce Wraith (1938) =

Car model

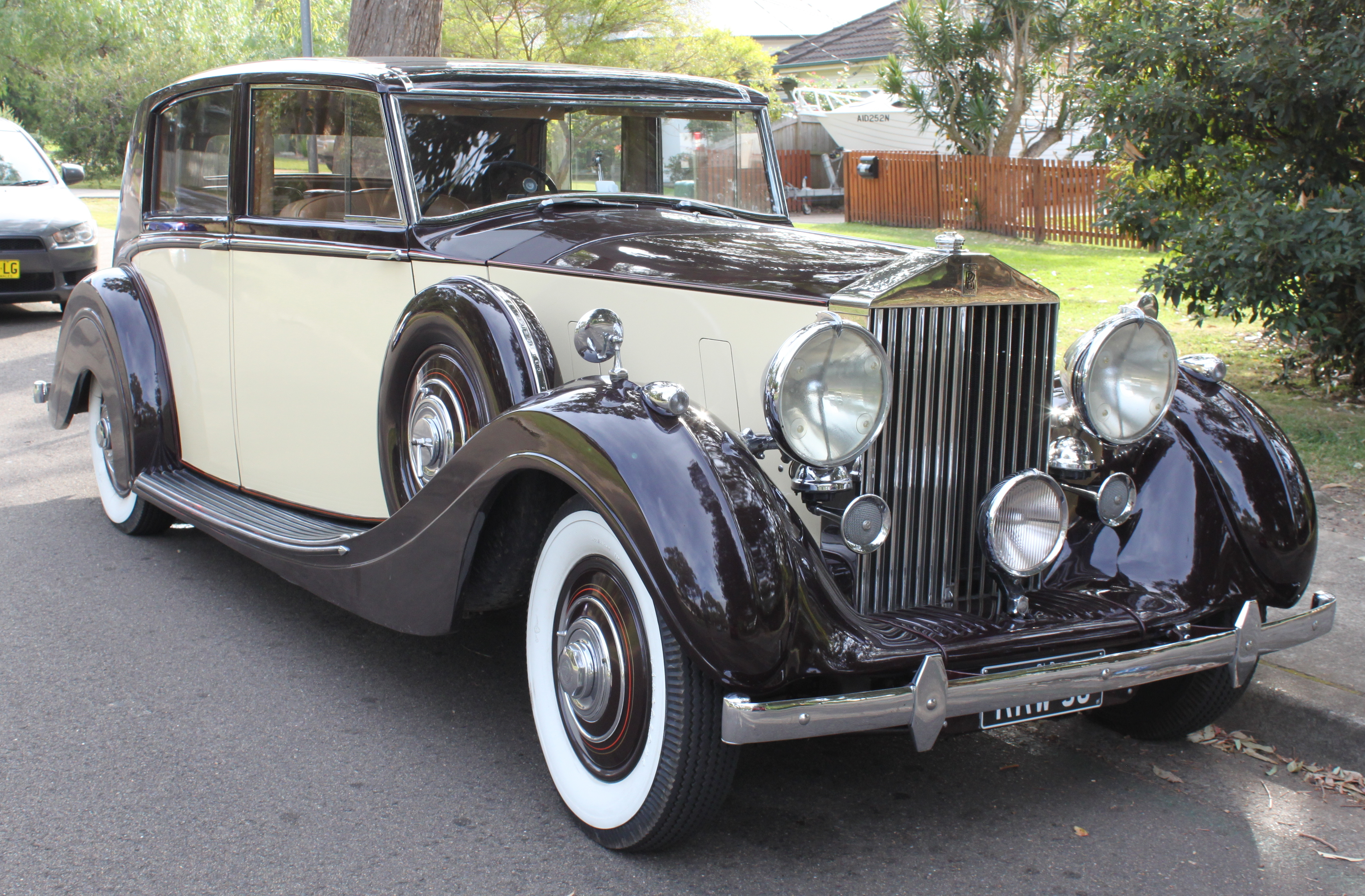

Overview
- Manufacturer: Rolls-Royce Ltd
- Production: 1938–1939 (chassis); 491 cars/492 chassis built
- Assembly: United Kingdom: Derby, England

Body and chassis
- Related: Bentley Mark V

Powertrain
- Engine: 4257 cc Straight 6
- Transmission: 4 speed manual

Dimensions
- Wheelbase: 3.45 m (136 inches)
- Length: 5.15 m (203 inches)
- Width: 1.87 m (74 inches)
- Kerb weight: 1.9 tons (approx)

Chronology
- Predecessor: 25/30
- Successor: Silver Wraith

The Rolls-Royce Wraith (not to be confused with the earlier small horsepower Goshawk-powered car, the 25/30 h.p) was built by Rolls-Royce at their Derby factory from 1938 to 1939 and supplied to independent coachbuilders as a rolling chassis.

Wraith is also the name of a new coupé announced by Rolls-Royce in 2013.

Wraith is an old Scottish word meaning "ghost" or "spirit", continuing Rolls-Royce's (at the time) new nomenclature that they had adopted, using words relating to silent, gracious, elegant, rarely seen and highly sought after for these reasons. In fact, the Wraith name originated from a 40/50 h.p, (Silver Ghost) that was named "The Wraith" by its original owner.

== Chassis design ==
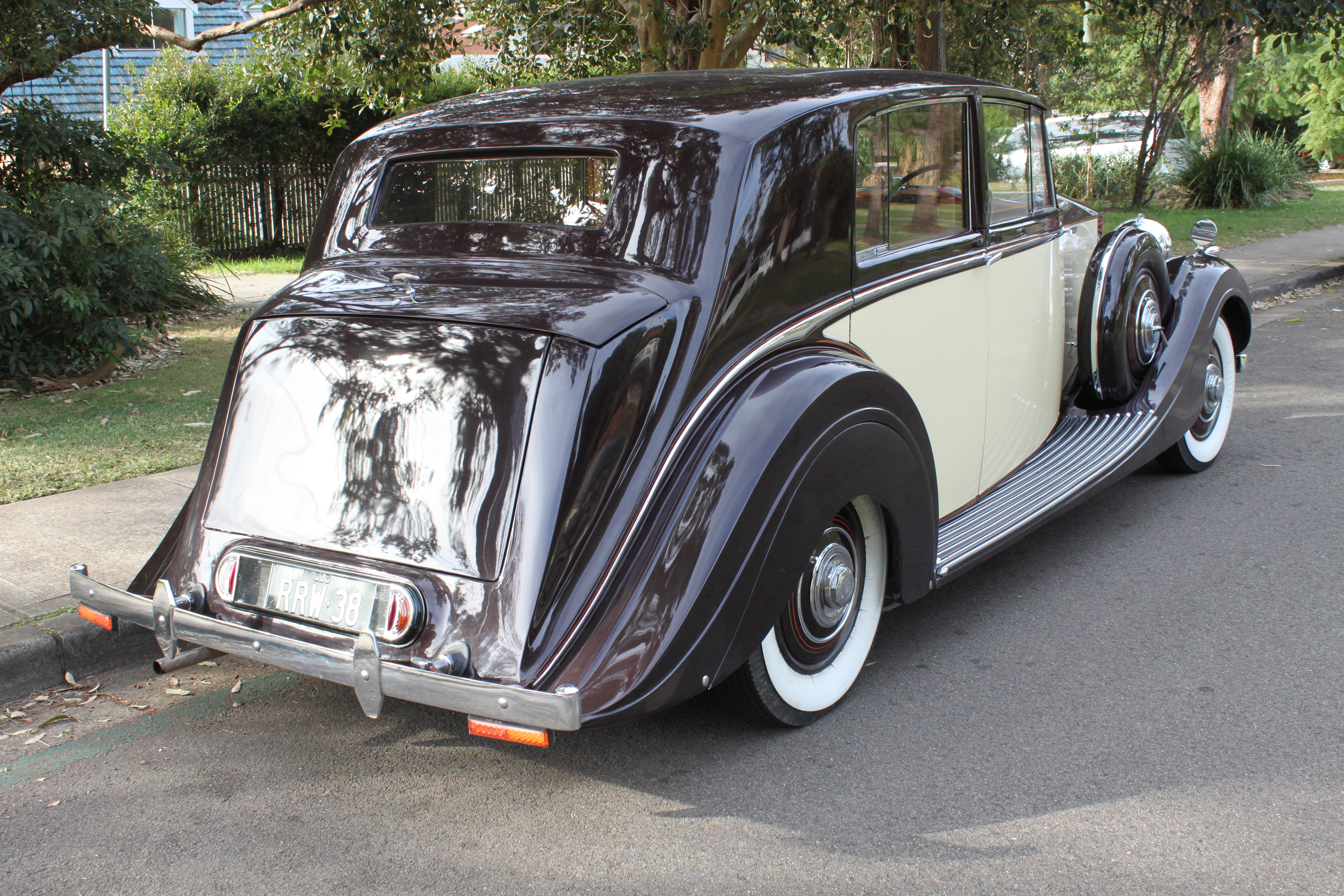
1938 Rolls-Royce Wraith sedan (The sixty-eighth Wraith built)

The in-line six cylinder, overhead valve, 4,257 cc engine was based on that of the 25/30 but featured a cross-flow cylinder head. The four-speed gearbox had synchromesh on second, third and fourth speeds and retained the traditional right-hand change. The later engines were used as the basis for the Bentley MK V and the Corniche.

The Wraith featured an independent coil-sprung front suspension based on the Packard 120 retaining semi-elliptical leaf springs on the rear axle. The hydraulic dampers at the front had their damping rate controlled by a governor and so varied with the speed of the car, making it superior to its predecessor, the 25/30 H.P. and on a par with the Phantom III. The car was still built on a separate chassis, but this was now of welded rather than the traditional riveted construction. The drum brakes were assisted by a mechanical servo driven by the engine, patented by Hispano-Suiza and built by Rolls-Royce under licence. Wire wheels of 17 inch diameter were fitted, with the spokes usually covered by removable discs. A built-in hydraulic jacking system was fitted, operated by a lever under the passenger seat.

== Performance ==
Cars based on the Wraith chassis could reach 85 mph (137 km/h); this was very dependent on the weight and style of body fitted. In one test by "The Motor" magazine in October 1938, a 0–50 mph time of 16.4 seconds was recorded.

== Production ==
In 1938, a typical touring car cost £1700, which included the chassis cost of £1100. 492 chassis were made. Although chassis were only produced in 1939, cars bearing 1940 or later delivery and registration dates are not uncommon. Some cars were finished off during early 1940. Others were held in storage and sold and first registered during the war years. A few were actually bodied during wartime. In addition, 16 prewar chassis were bodied in early 1946 and duly delivered to the government. The final Wraith was delivered in 1947.

== Gallery ==
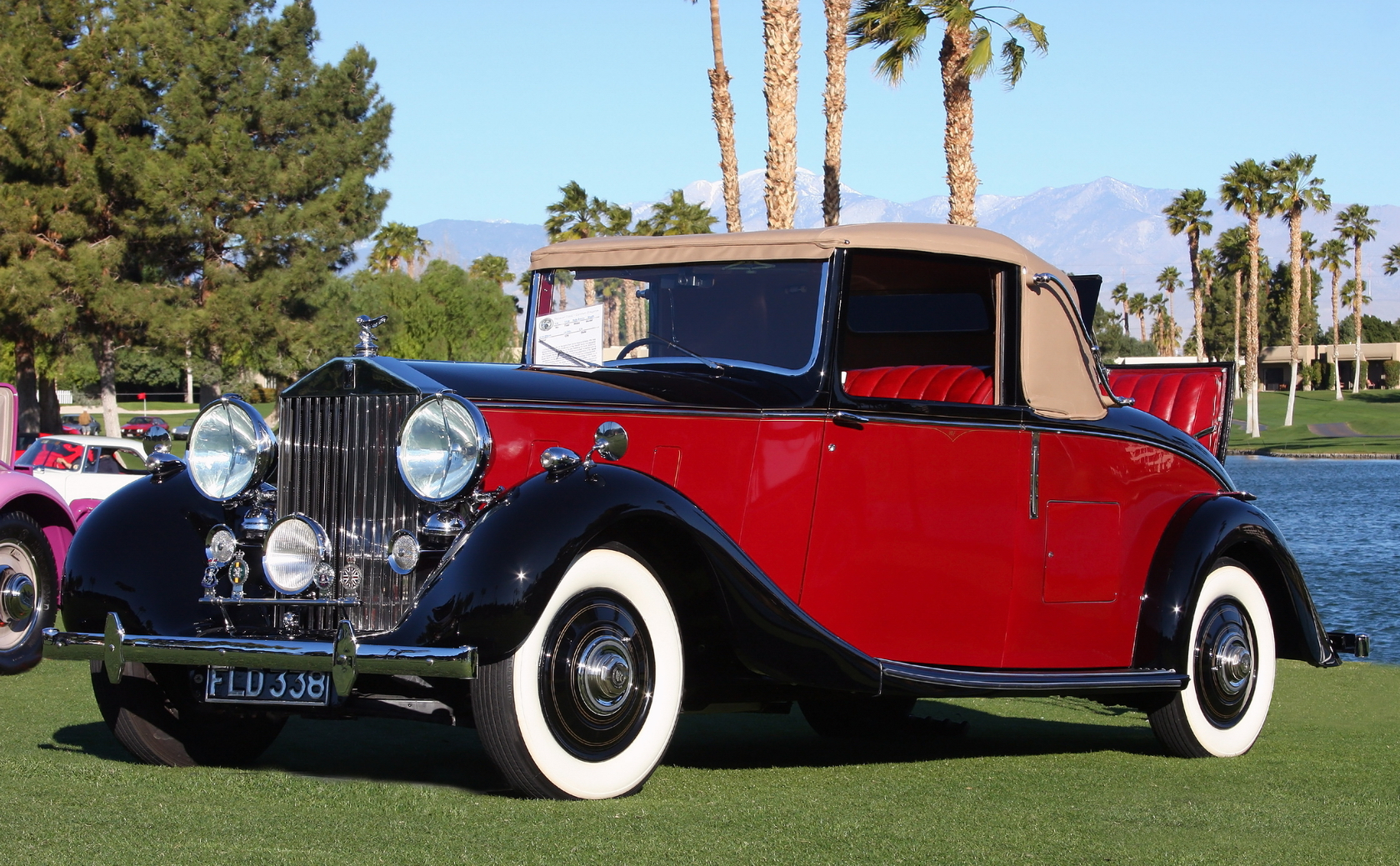
1938 Rolls-Royce Wraith Drophead Coupé by Hooper

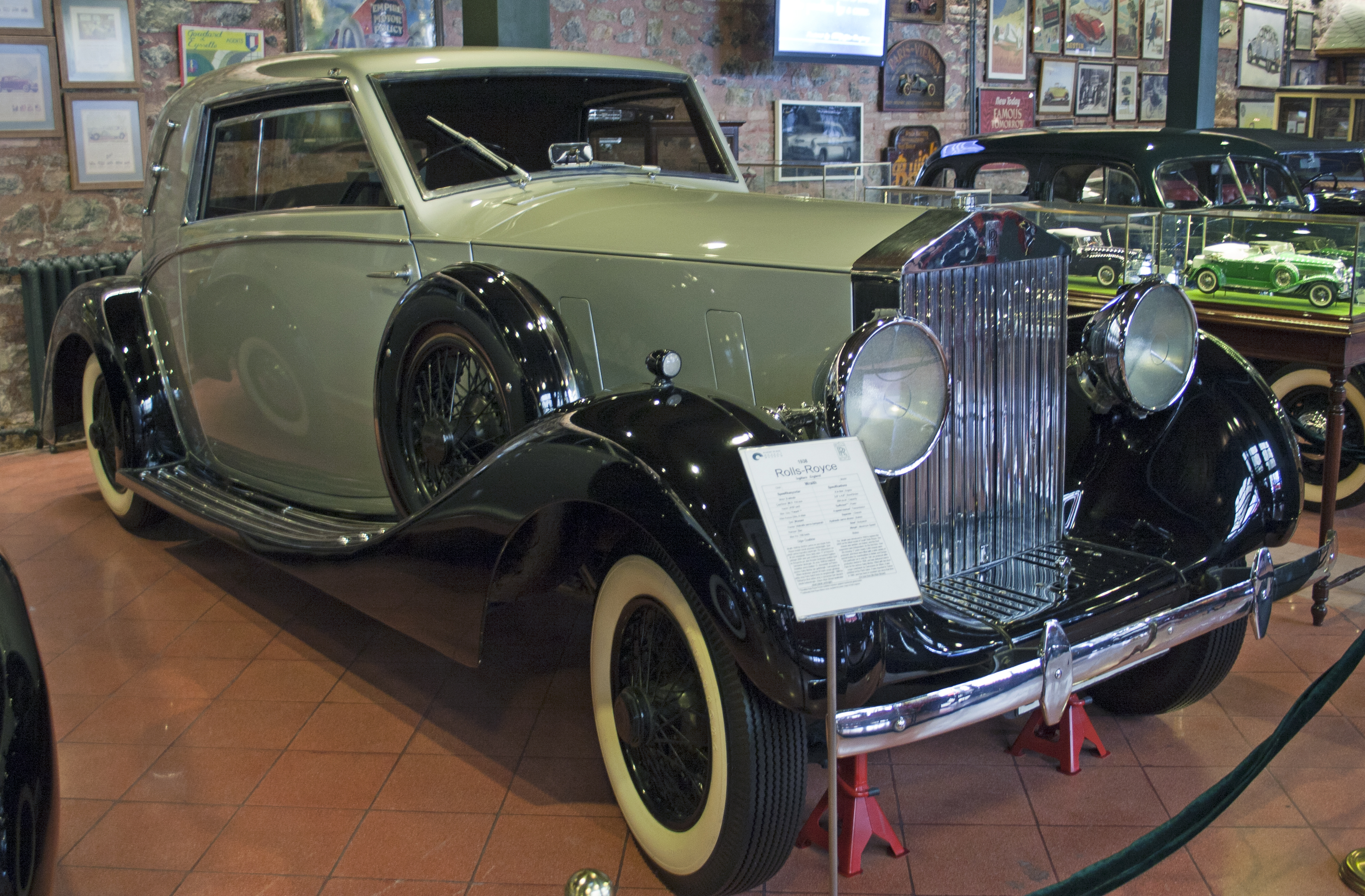
1938 Rolls-Royce Wraith with closed coupé bodywork by De Villars (The twelfth Wraith built)

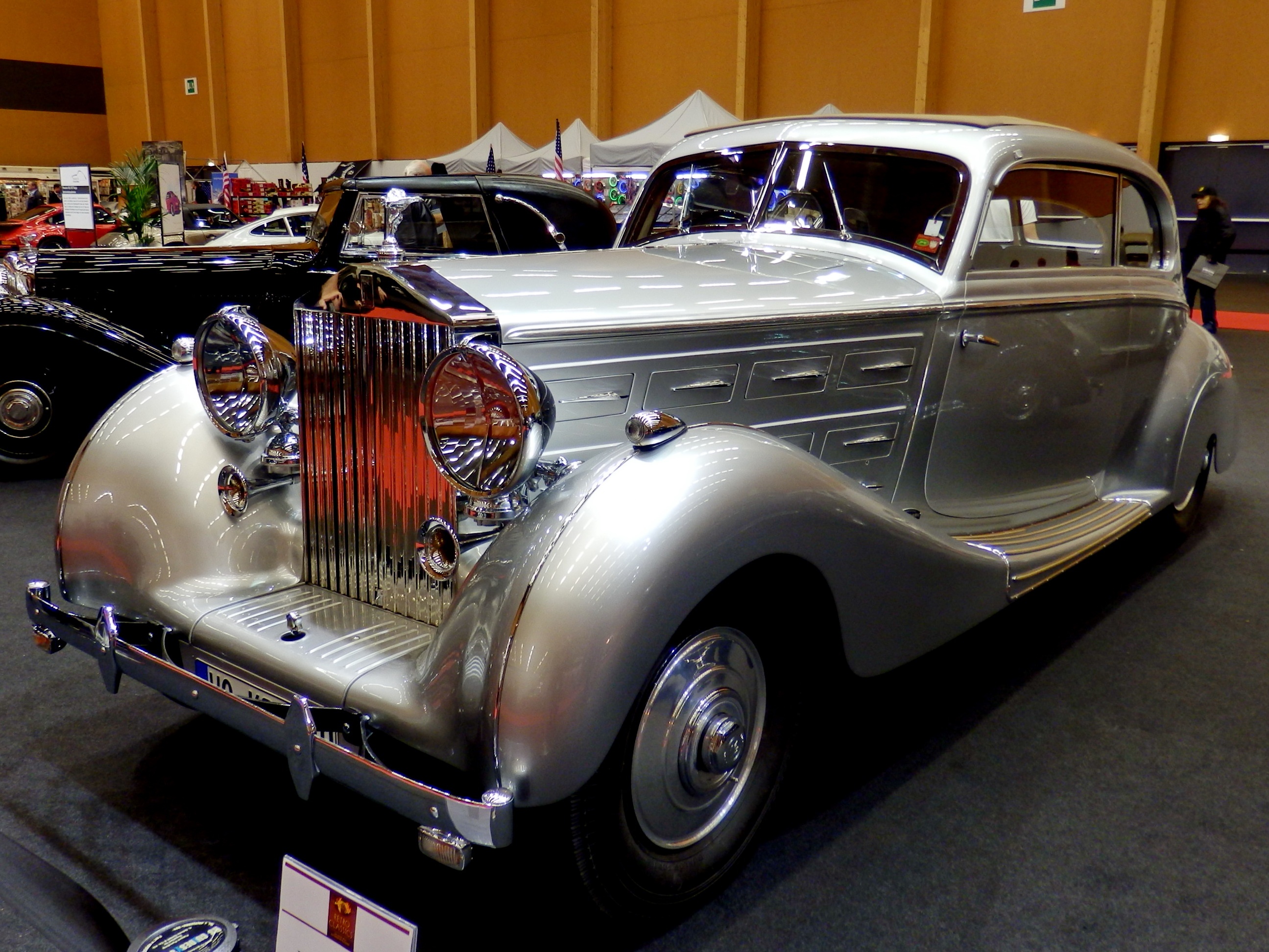
1938 Rolls-Royce Wraith 2-door saloon

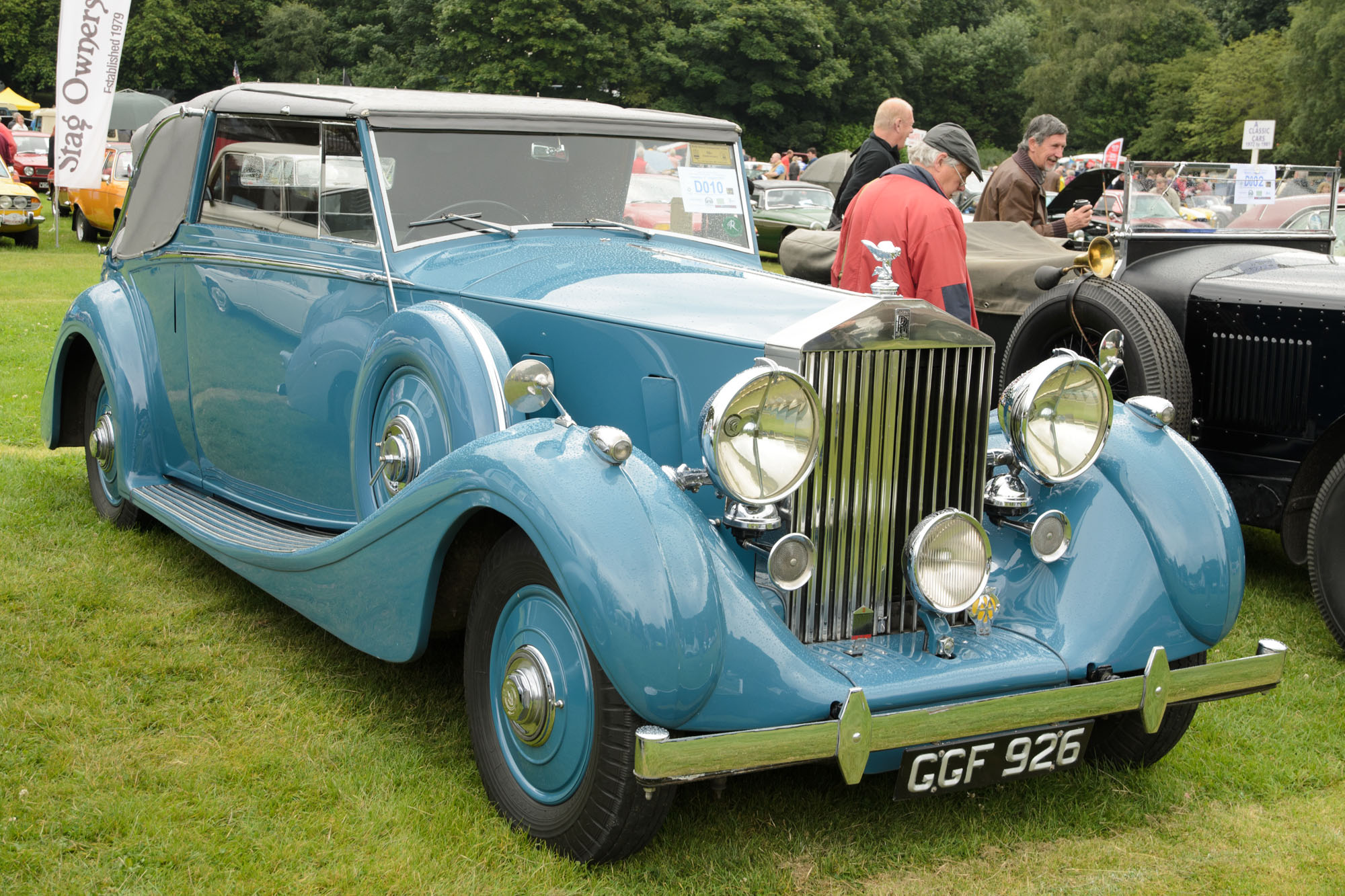
1939 Rolls-Royce Wraith by James Young

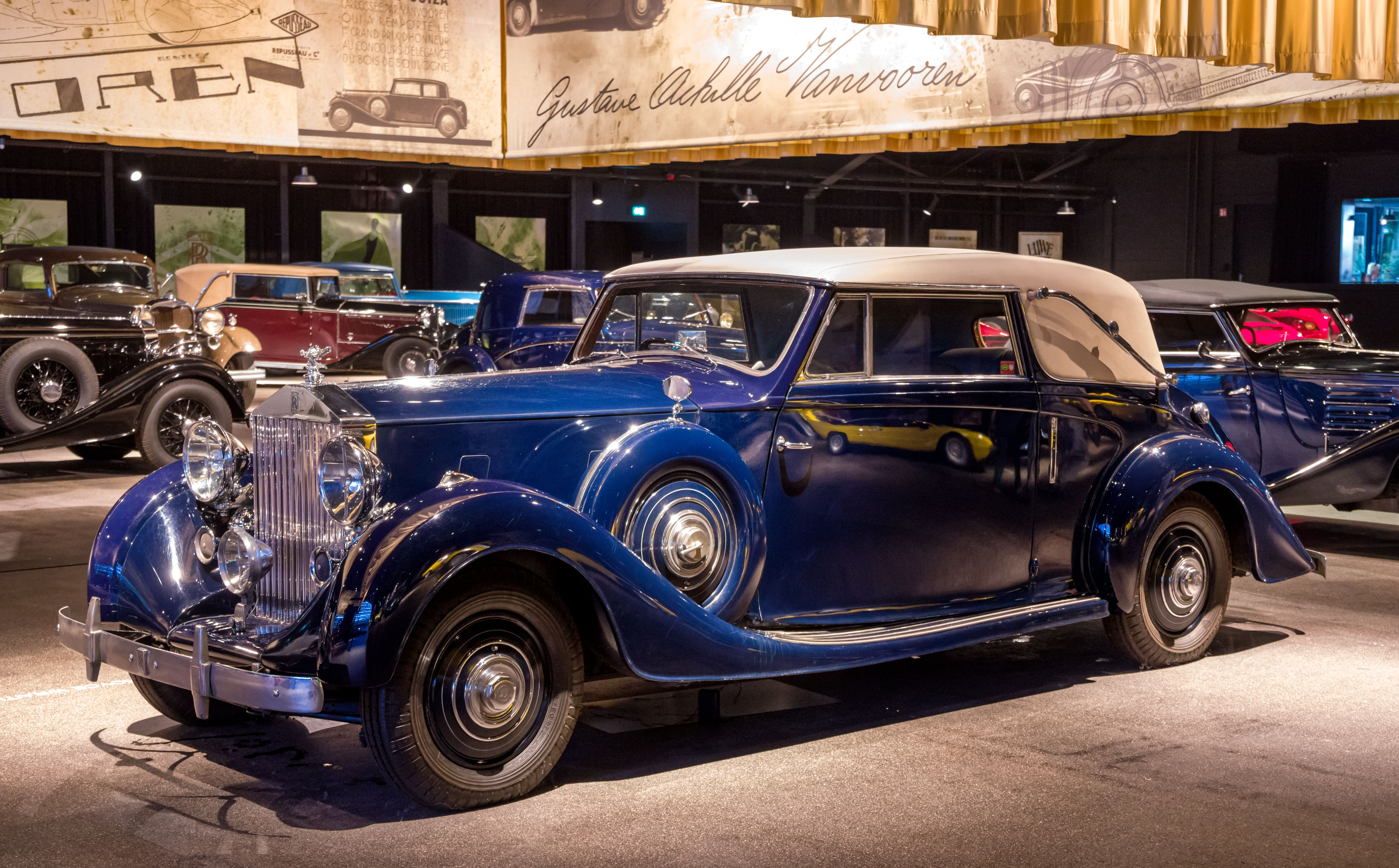
Rolls-Royce Wraith Faux Cabriolet Vanvooren

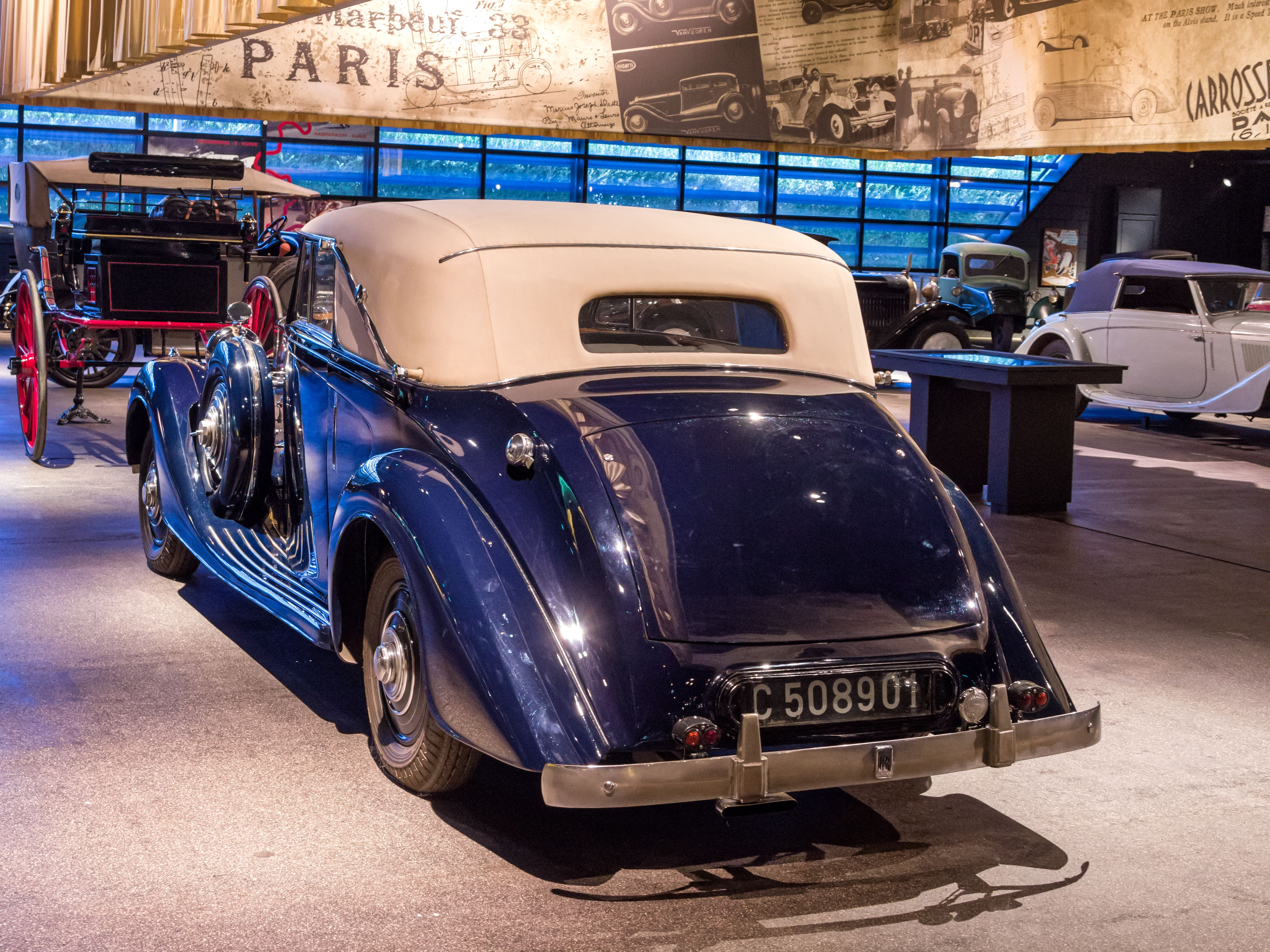
Rolls-Royce Wraith Faux Cabriolet Vanvooren (rear)

== Film and media appearances ==
- The eponymous registration plate of the novel and TV series NOS4A2 belongs to a Rolls-Royce Wraith.
- Another Rolls-Royce Silver Wraith appeared in the 1956 novel The Hundred and One Dalmatians as Cruella de Vil's car.

== See also ==
- Rolls-Royce Silver Wraith
