= Rolls-Royce 30 hp =

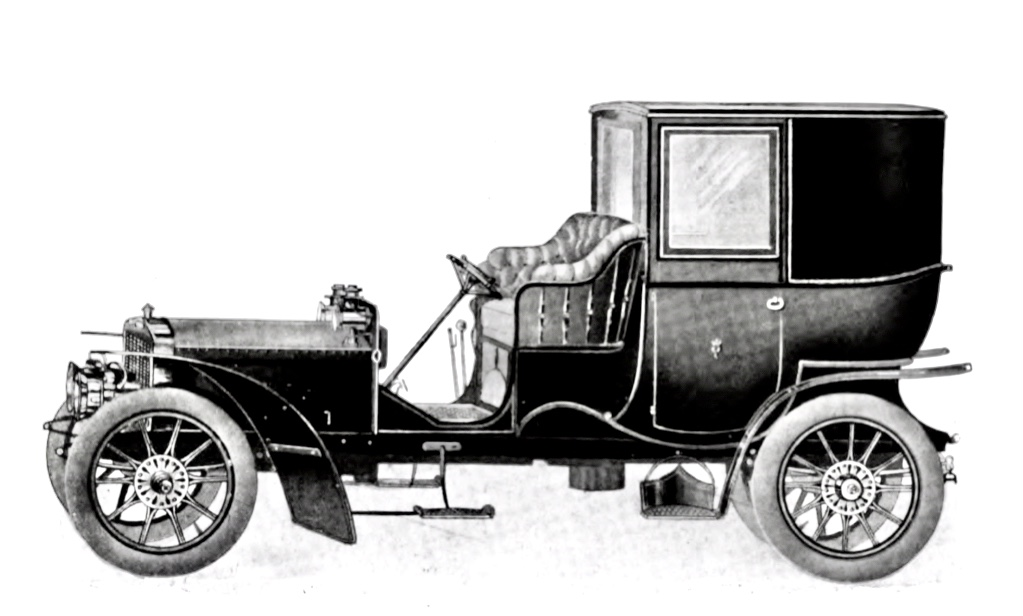

Overview
- Manufacturer: Royce Limited
- Production: 1905–1906; 37 made
- Designer: Sir Henry Royce

Powertrain
- Engine: 6000cc 6-cylinder.
- Transmission: four-speed

Dimensions
- Wheelbase: 112 in (2,845 mm) or 118 in (2,997 mm)
- Length: 157 in (3,988 mm) or 158.75 in (4,032 mm)

Chronology
- Successor: 40/50 (Silver Ghost)

The Rolls-Royce 30 hp was one of four cars to be produced as a result of an agreement of 23 December 1904 between Charles Rolls and Henry Royce. Badged as a Rolls-Royce, (Note: Rolls-Royce was not formed as a company until 1906.) the 30 hp was produced during 1905 and 1906 by Royce's company, Royce Ltd. at its factory in Cooke Street, Hulme, Manchester. It was sold exclusively by Rolls' motor dealership, C.S.Rolls & Co., at a price of GBP 890. (Note: In chassis only form.) The engine was exhibited at the Paris Salon in December 1904, along with the 10 hp, 15 hp and 20 hp models.

Claude Johnson was keen that a six-cylinder model was included in the Rolls-Royce line-up as other "quality" makers, especially Napier, were adding them to their ranges. The 30 hp was discontinued when the company changed to a single model policy and launched the 40/50 (Silver Ghost).

== Engine ==
The engine is made of three separately-cast two-cylinder units with monobloc heads which are common with the two-cylinder 10 hp and four-cylinder 20 hp types sharing their bore of 4 in (102 mm) and stroke of 5 in (127 mm). It is water-cooled and of 6,000 cc capacity with overhead inlet and side exhaust valves.

A single Royce carburettor is fitted. Early cars have a high-tension ignition system using pre-charged accumulators, a trembler and a coil ignition system; on later cars this is supplemented by a magneto which could be used as an alternative. As the lighting supplied uses oil for the side and tail and acetylene for the headlights, there is no other drain on the accumulators, which need to be recharged between outings. The power output is 30 bhp (22 kW) at 1000 rpm. The engine speed is controlled by a governor that can be over-ridden by the pedal-controlled accelerator.

A four-speed transmission carried over from the "Light" 20 hp model is connected to the engine via a short shaft. On this transmission, third gear is direct and fourth speed an overdrive ratio. A leather-faced cone clutch is used.

=== Crankshaft ===
The crankshaft is carried in seven main bearings in an attempt to keep vibration to a minimum, a problem on many early six-cylinder engines, as the dynamics of the layout were still not fully understood. Flywheels are fitted at both the front and rear of the crankshaft. After some early cars suffered broken crankshafts Royce modified the front flywheel to incorporate a harmonic damper which overcame the problem.

== Car ==
The car has a top speed of 55 mph (89 km/h). There is a transmission brake operating on a 12.5 in (318 mm) drum fitted behind the gearbox operated by foot pedal and internal expanding 12 in (305 mm) drum brakes on the back axle operated by the handbrake lever. Suspension is by semi-elliptic leaf springs on both front and rear axles with an additional crossways helper spring on the rear. The axle is located by a triangular strut linking axle and chassis and the main drive thrust is transmitted to the car by links between the ends of the axle and forward spring brackets. By this means the springs are only responsible for suspension. Artillery type wheels with wooden spokes were fitted.

Two chassis lengths were made, the short is 112 in (2,845 mm) in length and the long 118 in (2,997 mm). The track is the same on both lengths at 56 in (1,422 mm). Rolls-Royce did not provide the coachwork. Instead, the cars were sold in chassis form for the customer to arrange their own body supplier. Both closed and open cars were made. Of the 37 or possibly 38 cars made, three were exported to the US, one to Canada and one to Germany.

Only one car, a short wheelbase model with chassis number 26355 is known to survive.
