= Rolls-Royce V-8 (1905) =

V-8
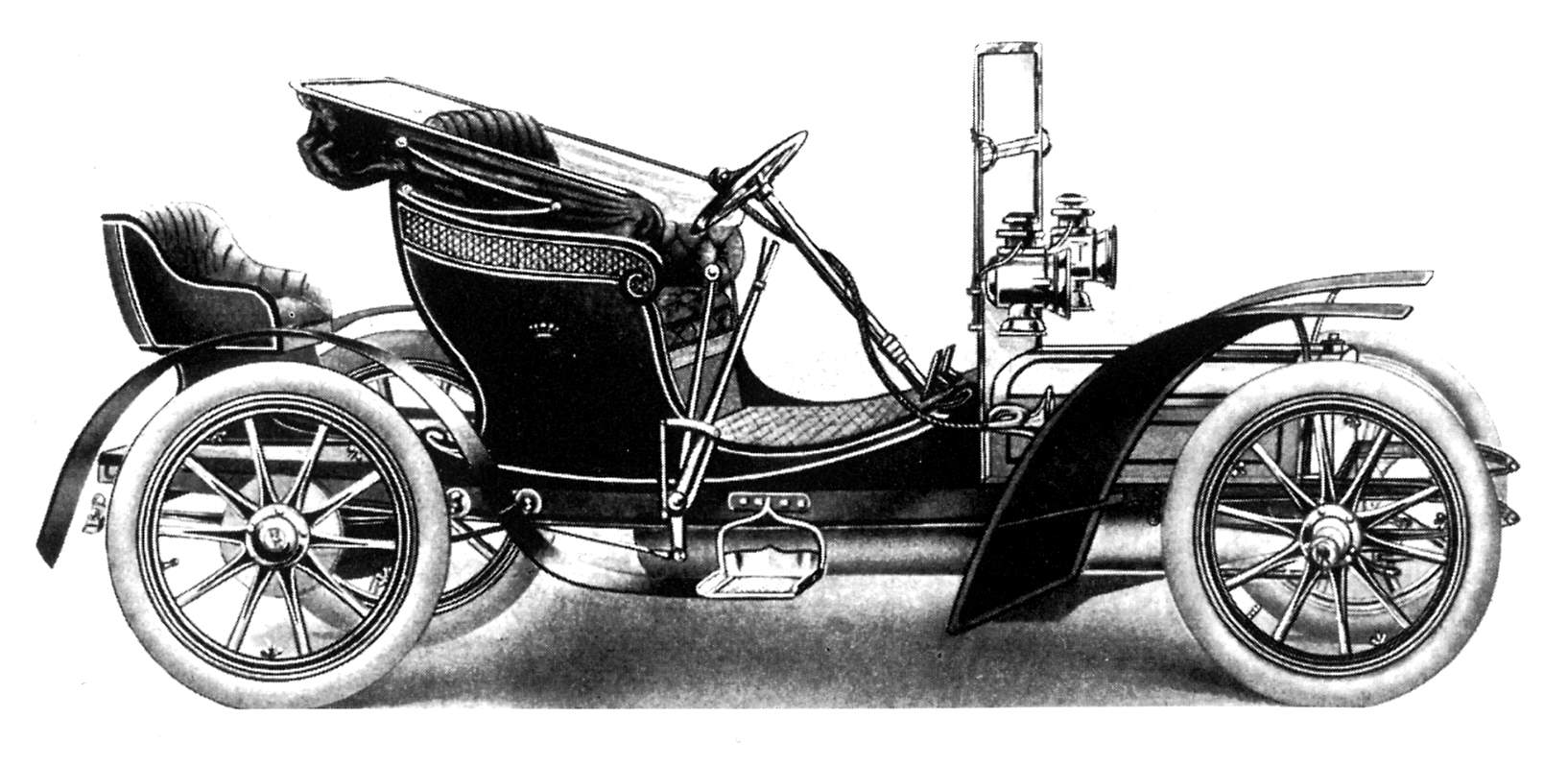

Overview
- Manufacturer: Rolls-Royce Ltd
- Production: 1905; 3 made
- Designer: Sir Henry Royce

Powertrain
- Engine: 3535 cc V-8 bore x stroke: 82.5 by 82.5 millimetres (3.25 in × 3.25 in)
- Transmission: three-speed

Dimensions
- Wheelbase: Landaulette 90 inches (2286 mm); Legalimit 106 inches (2692 mm)

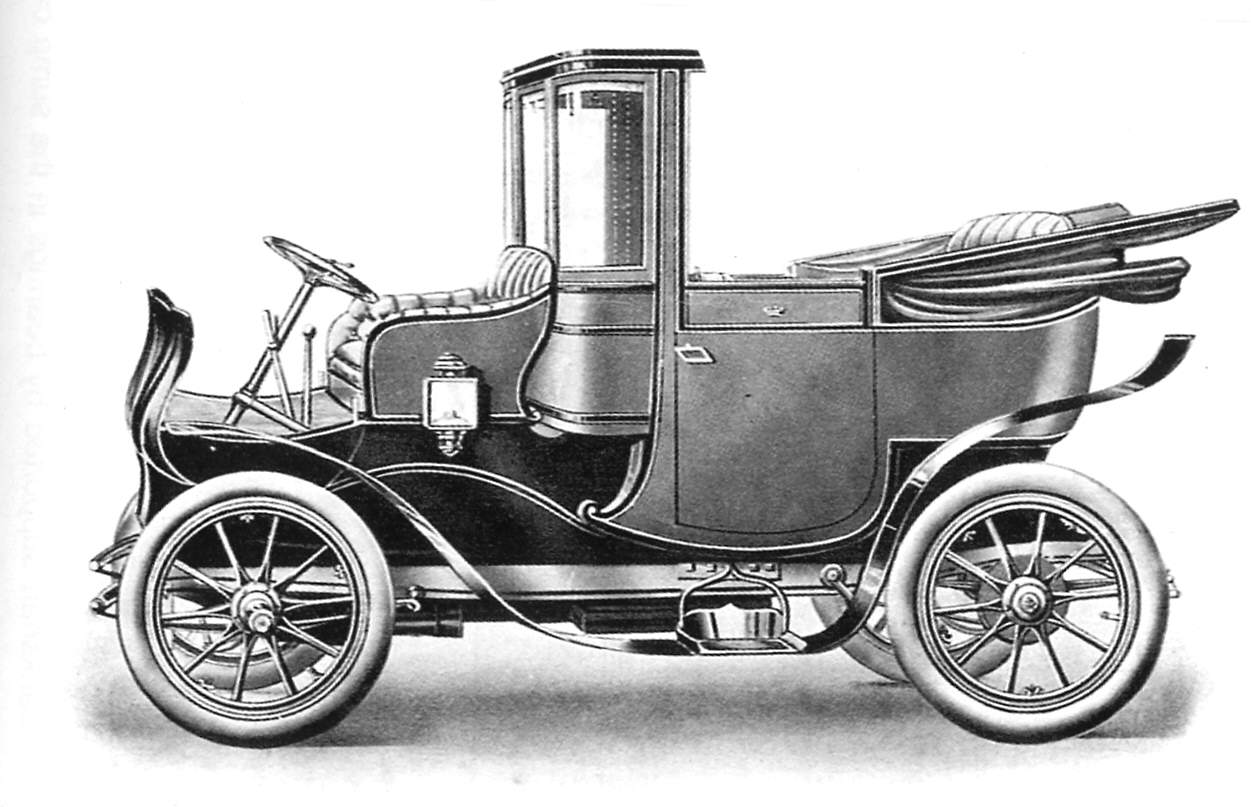
The V-8 with Landaulet par Excellence body

The Rolls-Royce V-8 was a car produced by Rolls-Royce in 1905 intended to compete with the then popular electric cars used in towns.

Claude Johnson, business partner of C. S. Rolls suggested there would be a market for an internal-combustion-engined car that could take on the electric car market. To do this it would have to be silent, vibrationless and smokeless. The engine would also have to be mounted under the car to give the appearance of a town brougham and so needed to be very shallow.

To compete with early electric cars, the engine was a completely new design with smoothness and quietness as top priorities, with power a secondary consideration. Production of the Rolls-Royce V-8 predated by a decade the first mass production of a V8 engine, by Cadillac, and came only three years after Leon Levavasseur built the very first V8 engine of any type, with his patented, liquid-cooled Antoinette 8V aviation engine, which also pioneered petrol direct injection for its induction system.

Henry Royce designed the engine in the form of a 90-degree, side-valve, 3,535 cc (215.7 cu in), V-8. To reduce fumes the then common drip lubrication was replaced by a pressure system. The power also seems to have been limited to maximise smooth running.

Two body styles were proposed, a "Landaulet par Excellence" to attack the town electric market and the "Legalimit". In reality, the Legalimit could travel at 26 miles per hour (41.8 km/h) but the engine was governed so as not to exceed the legal speed limit in Britain at the time of 20 miles per hour (32.2 km/h).

The Legalimit had the engine conventionally mounted at the front but under a very low bonnet. Only one example of the V-8 was sold, a Legalimit (chassis number 40518) to Sir Alfred Harmsworth. This was later taken back by the factory. All three cars then seem to have been used as works cars or for customer visits. Rolls ordered three more chassis for delivery in 1906 but there is no evidence these were ever made.

Although the car cannot be judged a success, lessons were learned from the engine design that were later used on the six-cylinder models which helped establish the Rolls-Royce name.

The 1905 V-8 is the only car model made by Rolls-Royce of which no example survives.
