= Rolls-Royce 20 hp =

Rolls-Royce 20 hp may refer to:

- Rolls-Royce 20 hp (1905)
- Rolls-Royce Twenty, 1920s

== See also ==
- Rolls-Royce 20/25
