= Rolls-Royce 10 hp =

Car model

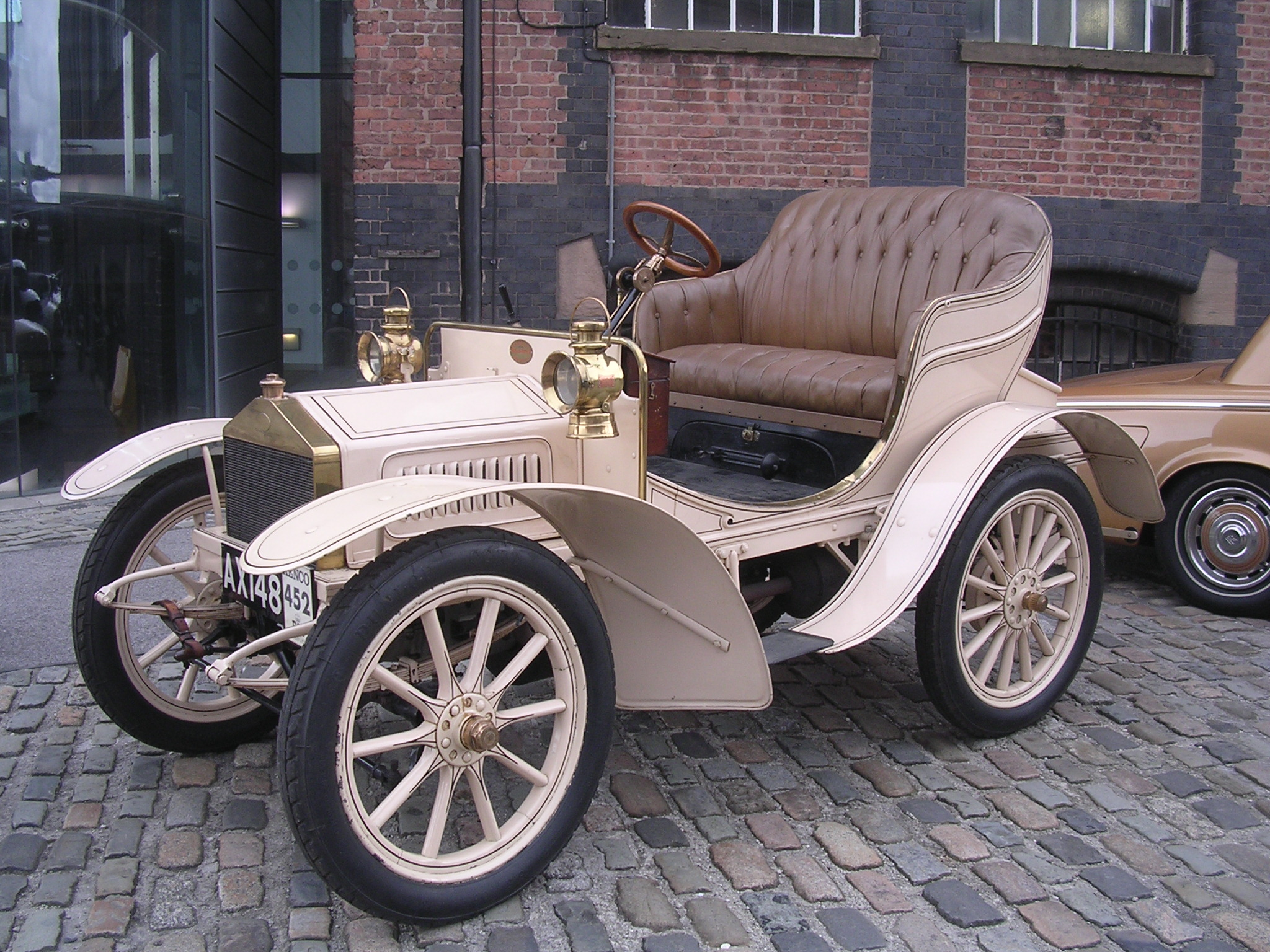
- chassis 20162, 1905 registration AX 148; Museum of Science and Industry, Manchester

Overview
- Manufacturer: Royce Limited
- Production: 1904–1906; 16 made
- Designer: Sir Henry Royce

Powertrain
- Engine: 1800 cc, later 1995 cc
- Transmission: three-speed

Dimensions
- Wheelbase: 1,905 mm (75.0 in)
- Length: 3,175 mm (125.0 in)
- Width: 1,400 mm (55.1 in)

The Rolls-Royce 10 hp was the first car to be produced as a result of an agreement of 23 December 1904 between Charles Rolls and Henry Royce, and badged as a Rolls-Royce. The 10 hp was produced by Royce's company, Royce Ltd., at its factory in Cooke Street, Hulme, Manchester, and was sold exclusively by Rolls' motor dealership, C.S.Rolls & Co., at a price of £395. (Note: £395 in 1904 could be equivalent to between £40,450 and £425,900 in 2017, depending on the price comparison used.) The 10 hp was exhibited at the Paris Salon in December 1904, along with 15 hp and 20 hp cars and engine for the 30 hp models.

The 10 hp was a development of Henry Royce's first car, the Royce 10, of which he produced three prototypes in 1903. This was itself based on a second-hand Decauville owned by Royce which he correctly believed he could improve. In particular, Royce succeeded in making his car significantly quieter than existing cars. Unlike the Royce 10 which had a flat-topped radiator, the Rolls-Royce 10 hp featured one with a triangular top which would appear on all subsequent cars.

The engine is a water-cooled twin-cylinder of 1800 cc enlarged to 1995 cc on later cars, with overhead inlet and side exhaust valves, and based on the original Royce engine but with an improved crankshaft. The power output was 12 hp (9 kW) at 1000 rpm. The car has a top speed of 39 mph (63 km/h). There is a transmission brake fitted behind the gearbox operated by foot pedal and internal expanding drum brakes on the back axle operated by the handbrake lever. Springing is by semi-elliptic leaf springs on both front and rear axles. It is a small car with a wheelbase of 75 in (1,905 mm) and a track of 48 in (1,219 mm).

Rolls-Royce intended to make 20 of the cars but only 16 were made as it was thought that a twin-cylinder engine was not appropriate for the marque. The last 10 hp was made in 1906.

Rolls-Royce did not provide the coachwork. Instead, the cars were sold in chassis form for the customer to arrange his own body supplier, with Barker recommended.

Four are believed to survive: the oldest, a 1904 car registered U44, chassis 20154, was sold for £3.2 million (approx £3.6 million after commission and taxes) to a private collector by Bonham's auctioneers in December 2007; AX 148 from 1905, chassis 20162, belongs to the UK Science Museum Collection and is usually on display in the Manchester Museum of Science and Industry; and SU 13 chassis 20165 from 1907 belongs to Bentley Motors. A fourth car, chassis 20159 is believed to be in a private collection.

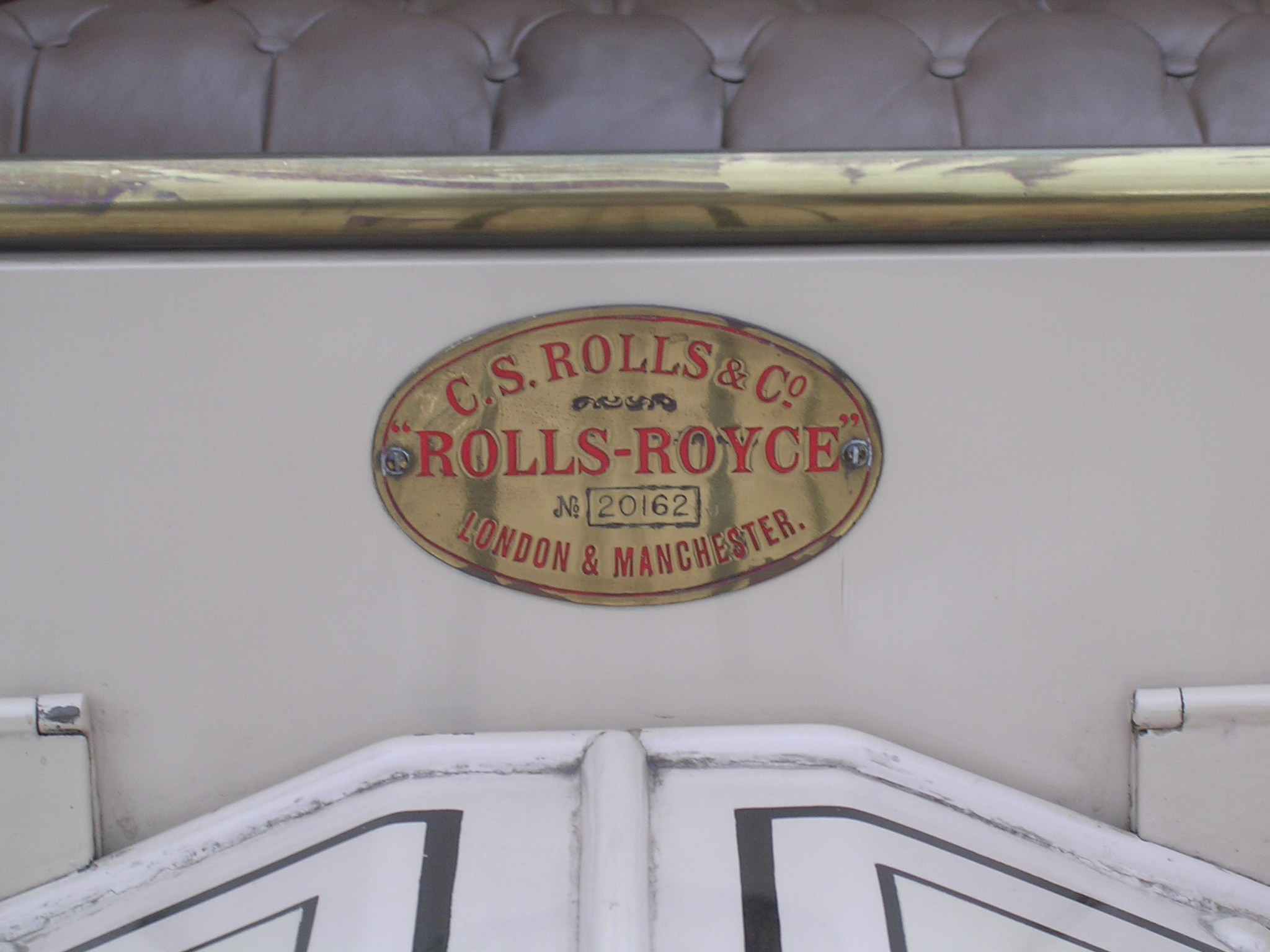
