= Rolls-Royce 15 hp =

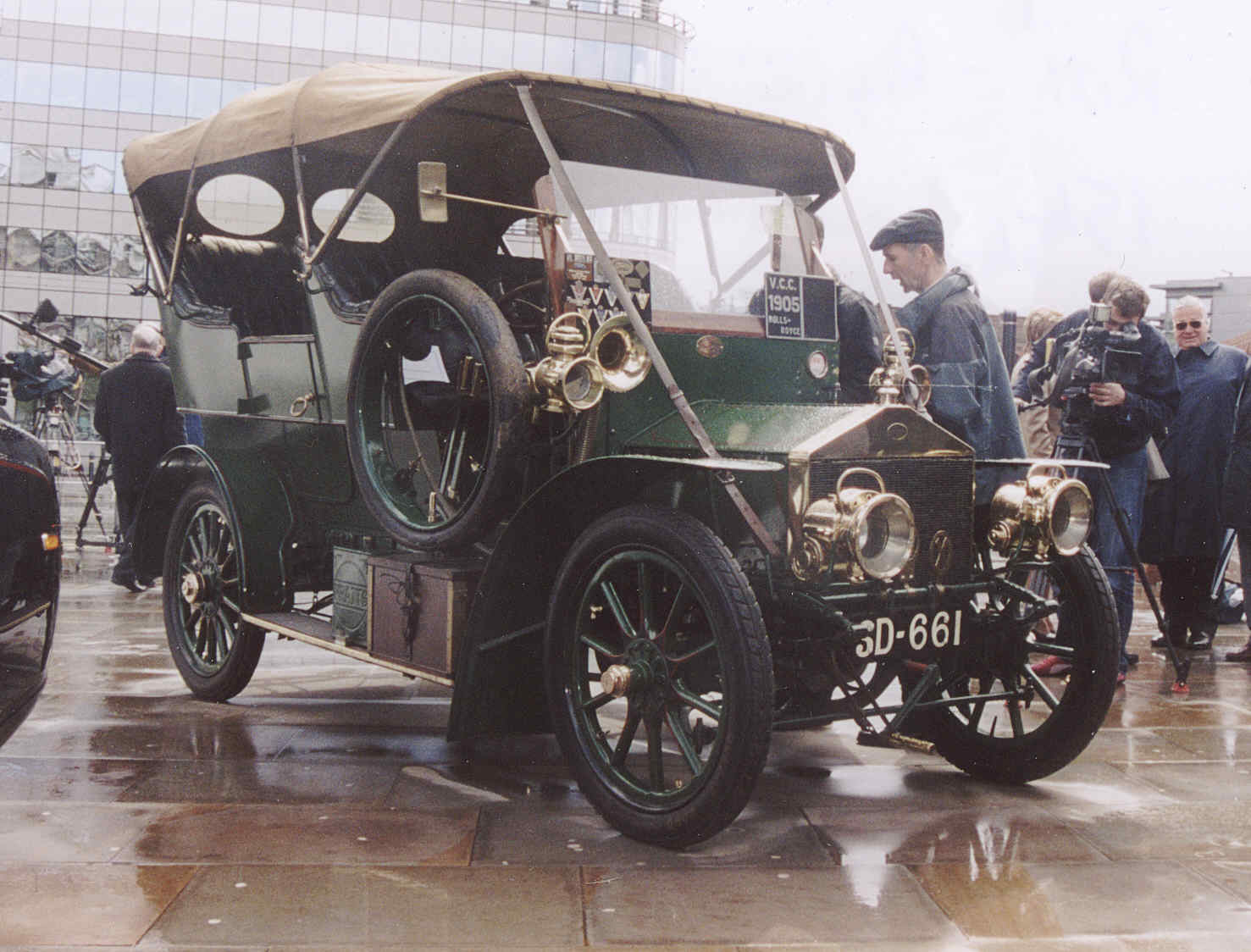

Overview
- Manufacturer: Royce Limited
- Production: 1905; 6 made
- Designer: Sir Henry Royce

Powertrain
- Engine: 3000 cc 3-cylinder.
- Transmission: three-speed

Dimensions
- Wheelbase: 103 in (2,616 mm)

The Rolls-Royce 15 hp was one of four cars to be produced as a result of an agreement of 23 December 1904 between Charles Rolls and Henry Royce. Badged as a Rolls-Royce, the 15 hp was produced by Royce's company, Royce Ltd., at its factory in Cooke Street, Hulme, Manchester. It was sold exclusively by Rolls' motor dealership, C.S.Rolls & Co., at a price of GBP500. The 15 hp was exhibited at the Paris Salon in December 1904, along with the 10 hp, 20 hp and engine for the 30 hp models, but as the new three-cylinder engine was not ready the chassis was incomplete.

Three-cylinder engines were quite popular in the early years of motoring, and one was part of the ambitious programme of the new company. The layout produced less vibration than 2-cylinder engines and was much simpler to make than a six-cylinder with its long crankshaft. However, Royce was making his range of engines using a standard two-cylinder block, putting two together for the four-cylinder and three for the six. The three-cylinder engine did not fit in with this production, having each of its cylinders cast separately, and this is thought to be the reason why only six were made. The engine, which has a bore of 4 in (102 mm) and stroke of 5 in (127 mm), is water-cooled and of 3000 cc capacity with overhead inlet and side exhaust valves. A high-tension ignition system using pre-charged accumulators, a trembler and a coil provides the ignition spark. As the lighting supplied uses oil, there is no other drain on the accumulators. The power output is 15 bhp (11 kW) at 1000 rpm. The engine speed is controlled by a governor that can be over-ridden by the pedal controlled accelerator. A three-speed gearbox is used, connected to the engine via a short shaft and a leather cone clutch is used.

The car has a top speed of 39 mph (63 km/h). There is a transmission brake fitted behind the gearbox operated by foot pedal and internal expanding drum brakes on the back axle operated by the handbrake lever. Springing is by semi-elliptic leaf springs on both front and rear axles with an additional crossways helper spring on the rear of some of the cars. Artillery type wheels were fitted.

Rolls-Royce did not provide the coachwork. Instead, the cars were sold in chassis form for the customer to arrange their own body supplier, with Barker recommended.

== Survivor ==
Of the six cars made only the second survives: originally registered in London as a demonstration car for Rolls, and later re-registered as SD 661.

In September 1905 it was purchased by the Hon Captain T. Dundas of Northallerton (d.1906). In 1907 it was bought by the Alice Elizabeth FitzAlan-Howard, 11th Countess of Loudon and moved to Galston, East Ayrshire. In March 1908 it passed to Douglas Dick of Kilmarnock who already had a reputation as the first car-owner in the town. The car ended in the Doune Motor Museum under ownership of the Royal Scottish Automobile Club. It is currently on display in Grampian Transport Museum in Alford, Aberdeenshire.
