= The Edwardians (anthology series) =

1972-73 British television miniseries

The Edwardians is a television miniseries or anthology series which was produced by the BBC, and first aired on BBC Television in 1972–73. In the United States, the series aired on PBS's Masterpiece Theatre in 1974. Consisting of eight 90 minute episodes, each episode examines a different individual of historical importance from the Edwardian era with one episode being devoted to Henry Royce and Charles Rolls. The figures who have a single episode devoted to each are Horatio Bottomley; E. Nesbit; Sir Arthur Conan Doyle; Robert Baden-Powell; Marie Lloyd; Daisy Greville, Countess of Warwick; and David Lloyd George.

== Unproduced episode ==
In 1971 the BBC commissioned the English dramatist Trevor Griffiths to write an episode, titled Such Impossibilities, dramatising the actions of trade unionist Tom Mann during the 1911 Liverpool general transport strike, in which he confronted the armed state. The BBC chose not to produce the script on stated grounds of cost, but more likely having deemed it too Marxist. The script was eventually published in 1977 by Faber & Faber in the joint volume Through the Night and Such Impossibilities: Two Plays for Television.

== Cast ==
- Thorley Walters as King Edward VII (in two episodes)
- Michael Jayston as Henry Royce
- Robert Powell as Charles Rolls
- Timothy West as Horatio Bottomley
- Judy Parfitt as E. Nesbit
- Nigel Davenport as Sir Arthur Conan Doyle
- Ron Moody as Robert Baden-Powell
- Georgia Brown as Marie Lloyd
- Virginia McKenna as Daisy Greville
- Anthony Hopkins as David Lloyd George

== Episodes ==
No.	Title	Directed by	Written by	Original release date
1	"Mr Rolls and Mr Royce"	Gerald Blake	Ian Curteis	21 November 1972
2	"Horatio Bottomley"	Alan Clarke	Julian Bond	28 November 1972
3	"E. Nesbit"	James Cellan Jones	Ken Taylor	5 December 1972
4	"Conan Doyle"	Brian Farnham	Jeremy Paul	12 December 1972
5	"Baden-Powell"	Robert Knights	John Prebble	19 December 1972
6	"The Reluctant Juggler"	Brian Farnham	Alan Plater	26 December 1972
7	"Daisy"	James Cellan Jones	David Turner	2 January 1973
8	"Lloyd George"	John Davies	Keith Dewhurst	9 January 1973
