= Rolls-Royce 20 hp (1905) =

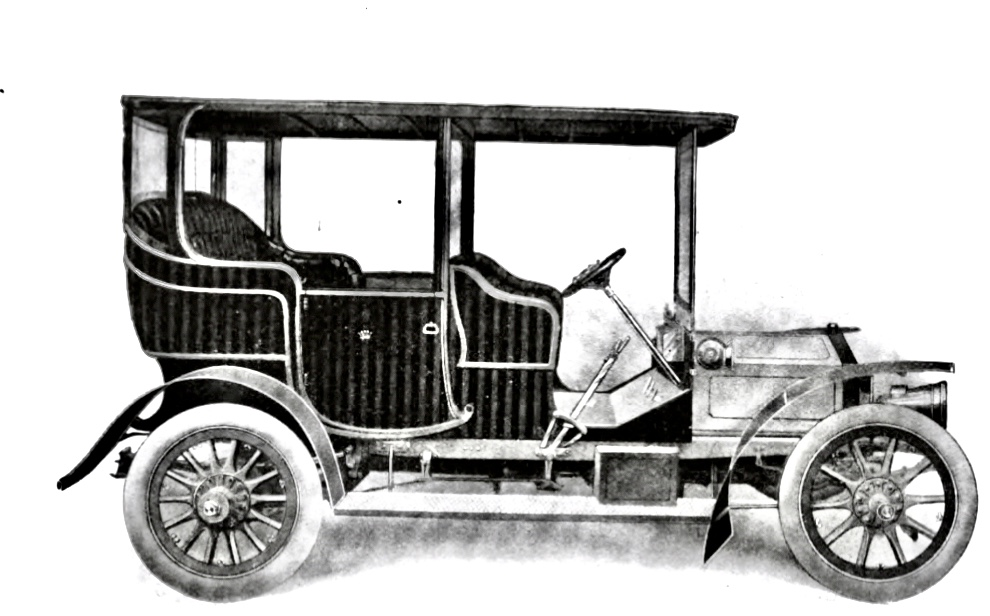

Overview
- Manufacturer: Royce Limited
- Production: 1905–1906; 40 made
- Designer: Henry Royce

Powertrain
- Engine: 4118cc 4-cylinder.
- Transmission: three- or four-speed

Dimensions
- Wheelbase: 106 in (2,692 mm) or 114 in (2,896 mm)

The Rolls-Royce 20 hp was one of four car models to be produced as a result of an agreement of 23 December 1904 between Charles Rolls and Henry Royce. Badged as a Rolls-Royce, the 20 hp was produced during 1905 and 1906 by Royce's company, Royce Ltd. at its factory in Cooke Street, Hulme, Manchester. It was sold exclusively by Rolls' motor dealership, C.S.Rolls & Co., at a price of GBP650. The 20 hp was exhibited at the Paris Salon in December 1904, along with the 10 hp, 15 hp and engine for the 30 hp models.

The engine was made of two separately cast two-cylinder units which were common with the two-cylinder 10 hp and six-cylinder 30 hp types sharing their bore of 4 in (102 mm) and stroke of 5 in (127 mm). It is water-cooled and of 4118 cc capacity with overhead inlet and side exhaust valves Early cars had a high-tension ignition system using pre-charged accumulators, a trembler and a coil ignition system; on later cars this was supplemented by a magneto which could be used as an alternative. As the lighting supplied uses oil for the side and tail and acetylene for the headlights, there is no other drain on the accumulators, which need to be recharged between outings. The power output is 20 bhp (15 kW) at 1000 rpm. The engine speed is controlled by a governor that can be over-ridden by the pedal-controlled accelerator. A three-speed gearbox was fitted at first, later changed to four-speed with the introduction of the Light 20 and subsequently fitted to all cars, connected to the engine via a short shaft and a leather-lined cone clutch was used. On the four-speed type, third gear is direct and fourth speed an overdrive ratio.

Two of the cars ran in the 1905 Isle of Man TT race and one driven by Percy Northey came second overall, the other driven by C.S. Rolls failed to finish after gearbox problems. Rolls tried again in 1906 and won. In December 1906 he took a car to the United States and won a race at Yonkers.

The first cars had a chassis length of 114 in (2,896 mm) but following the special lightweight cars made for the TT Race a shorter 106 in (2,692 mm) version became available. These would become known as the Heavy 20 and Light 20. The track on the Light 20 was also narrower at 52 in (1,321 mm) compared with the Heavy 20's 56 in (1,422 mm). Rolls-Royce did not provide the coachwork. Instead, the cars were sold in chassis form for the customer to arrange his own body supplier. Both closed and open cars were made.

The Light 20 has a top speed of 50 mph (80 km/h) (52 mph (84 km/h) on the TT versions) and the Heavy 20 47 mph (76 km/h). This speed would be reduced if a heavy body was fitted. There is a transmission brake operating on a drum fitted behind the gearbox operated by foot pedal and internal expanding drum brakes on the back axle operated by the handbrake lever. Suspension is by semi-elliptic leaf springs on both front and rear axles with an additional crossways helper spring on the rear. Artillery type wheels with wooden spokes were fitted.

Forty chassis were produced between 1905 and 1906. Three cars, chassis numbers 26350, 40509 and 40520 are known to survive.
