= Eric Platford =

English engineer

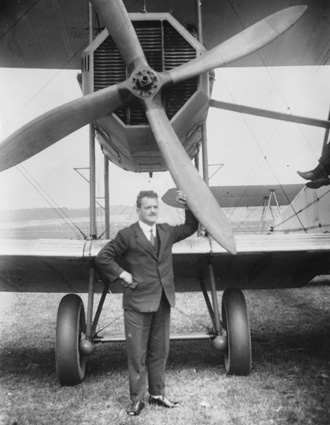
Eric Platford with the Alcock and Brown Vimy in 1919

Eric Platford (1883 - 20 November 1938) was an English engineer and a Rolls-Royce pioneer. Platford had an illustrious career with Rolls-Royce.

Platford was employed by Henry Royce and assisted in the construction of Royce's first car from his factory in Cooke Street, Manchester. In 1906 he won the Isle of Man Tourist Trophy as onboard mechanic alongside the Hon. Charles Rolls. In 1913, he took third place in the first Spanish Grand Prix having led the race. He conceded first place on team orders.

In 1919, Platford prepared the Rolls-Royce Eagle engines in St. John's, Newfoundland for the first successful non-stop transatlantic flight, by Alcock & Brown.

== Early life ==
Platford was born in 1883 in Manchester, England. His father worked in banking but died when Eric was 6 months old. He attended Cheadle Hulme School and became an apprentice at Royce Limited at the age of 17.
