= Henry Royce =

English engineer and car designer (1863–1933)

Sir Henry Royce Bt OBE
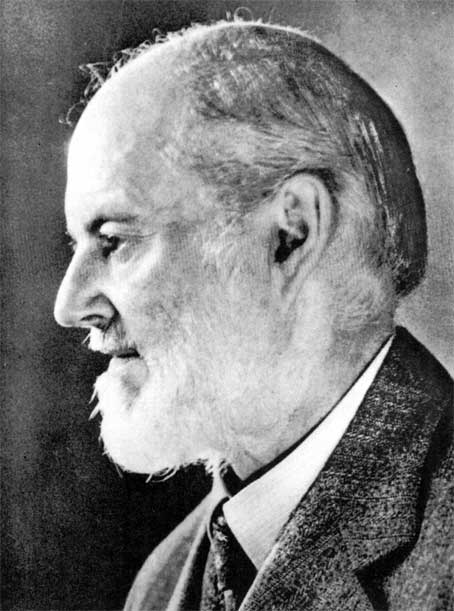
- Born: Frederick Henry Royce; 27 March 1863; Alwalton, Huntingdonshire, England
- Died: 22 April 1933 (aged 70); West Wittering, Sussex, England
- Known for: Co-founder of Rolls-Royce
- Spouse: Minnie Grace Punt (m. 1893–1912)
- Engineering career
- Projects: Rolls-Royce

Sir Frederick Henry Royce, 1st Baronet (/rɔɪs/; 27 March 1863 – 22 April 1933) was an English engineer famous for his designs of car and aeroplane engines that had a reputation for reliability and longevity. He and his two business associates Charles Rolls (1877–1910) and Claude Johnson (1864–1926) together founded the Rolls-Royce Limited company in 1904.

Rolls-Royce Limited initially focused on large, 40–50 horsepower motor cars, the Silver Ghost and its successors. Royce produced his first aero engine shortly after the outbreak of the First World War, and aircraft engines became Rolls-Royce's principal product.

Royce's health broke down in 1911, and he was persuaded to leave his factory in the Midlands at Derby and, taking a team of designers, move to the south of England spending winters in the south of France. He died at his home in Sussex in the spring of 1933.

== Early life ==
Royce was born in Alwalton, Huntingdonshire, near Peterborough on 27 March 1863 to Mary (née King) and James Royce. He had four older siblings, Emily (born in 1853), Fanny Elizabeth (born in 1854), Mary Anne (born in 1856) and James Allen (born in 1857). On both sides Royce was descended from generations of farmers and millers. His father James started as a farmer before, upon his marriage in 1852 to Mary, the daughter of a farmer, he acquired the lease of a flour mill at Castor in Northamptonshire. James was unable to make a success of the mill at Castor and moved to nearby Alwalton where he took up the lease of a flour mill, which he leased from the Ecclesiastical Commissioners. In 1863 financial circumstances forced James to mortgage his lease to the London Flour Company. In 1867 the business failed and due to their reduced circumstances the decision was made to board the three girls in Alwalton while Mary worked as an housekeeper with various families in the area. Meanwhile James took the two boys with him to London where he found work in a flour mill in Southwark operated by the London Flour Company. At some stage James had contracted Hodgkin’s disease, and he died in 1872 at the age of 41 in a public poorhouse in Greenwich. Royce was later to describe his father as unsteady but clever, someone lacking the determination to apply himself single-mindedly to a task. Royce was nine years old at the time of his father's death and his formal education to date had consisted of one year at the Croydon British School.

For a while he stayed with an elderly couple who were family friends in London, but when one died he was forced to move on. He later reminisced that “My food for the day was often two thick slices of bread soaked in milk.” On one occasion he found it warmer to sleep with a dog in its dog kennel. As his mother was able to only provide him with very limited financial help, Royce at the age of 10 got a job selling newspapers for W. H. Smith, firstly at Clapham Junction and later at Bishopsgate Station. He was able to earn sufficient money to allow him to also attend school over the next two years. In 1876 at the age of 13 he obtained a job at the Post Office delivering telegrams. He was paid a half penny for each delivery.

He would occasionally visit his great-aunt Catherine on his mother’s side, who lived in Fletton near Peterborough. Feeling that he deserved a better future she was able in 1878 despite her own limited financial circumstances to obtain Royce an apprenticeship with the Great Northern Railway company at its works in Peterborough in return for paying them £20 a year. Moving to Peterborough Royce boarded with the Yarrow family, who had a son who was already an apprentice at the works. To pay for his day-to-day living expenses Royce continued to deliver newspapers. To make up for his lack of formal education, he also took evening classes in English and mathematics. In November 1880 Royce had to give up his apprenticeship after his great-aunt’s money ran out. Due to a depression affecting the British economy at the time Royce couldn’t find a local job, so he walked from Peterborough to Leeds where he stayed with his sister Fanny Elizabeth and her husband. Royce’s mother was also a member of the household. Within two weeks Royce had found employment at toolmakers Greenwood and Batley in Leeds where he was paid 11 shillings for a 54 hour week. Outside work he studied various technical subjects, including electrics.

Before a year had passed he returned to London where he was able to obtain a position at the Electric Lighting and Power Generating Company in Southwark as a tester, despite having no practical experience in the electric field. The role doubled his wages to 22 shillings a week, though he continued to work long hours and to neglect his diet. The company changed its name to the Maxim-Weston Company after it expanded into manufacturing lamps designed by Hiram Maxim and Edward Weston. In his spare time Royce began attending evening classes at the City and Guilds Institute for the Advancement of Technical Education. Among his tutors was the highly respected physicist and electrical engineer William Edward Ayrton. In 1882 at the age of 19 Royce was promoted to chief engineer of his employer’s subsidiary the Lancashire Maxim-Weston Electric Company in Liverpool. The under-capitalised company was involved in lighting streets and theatres. Despite winning a major contract with the Liverpool City Council the company was forced into liquidation on 24 March 1884. In May 1884 the Maxim-Weston Company purchased the assets of its subsidiary, with the aim of obtaining further contracts with the Liverpool City Council, who had expressed confidence with both Royce and the company’s work to date. Until these could be obtained Royce would be unpaid if he stayed with the new company. Royce decided instead to start his own business.

== Starts F. H. Royce and Company ==
Despite not being especially familiar with the city, the 21-year-old Royce, with his savings of £20, decided to start his own business in Manchester. It has been speculated that he chose Manchester because of lower costs than Liverpool or London. In 1884 he established F. H. Royce and Company, operating from a workshop in Blake Street, Hulme, manufacturing small electrical and mechanical items. Within the first six months a friend called Ernest Alexander Claremont (1863 – 4 April 1922) had entered into partnership with Royce, contributing £50 that he appears to have borrowed from his father. Royce normally did the design and manufacture of their products with his partner responsible for sales, payments and deliveries as well as assisting in the workshop. Their partnership was to continue until Claremont's death. By 1895 they were employing a salesman, W. Sergeant. Having little money, the partners lived in a shared room above the workshop, living on sandwiches and sausages.

After starting out with small items they moved into sub-contracting manufacture of lighting components, such as filaments, holders and lamps, though to make ends meet they would undertake any engineering work, including repairing sewing machines. The business’s first successful product was an electric bell for domestic use. While things were tight during their first three years as they invested any profits back into the business they were still able progressively to employ a workman, Thomas Weston Seale to assist in the manufacturing while six young women were taken on to assemble the bells and light filaments. In 1887 Tom Jones joined the firm as a workman to assist in the manufacturing of other products. By 1889 there were nine employees.

As their business situation improved and they expanded into undertaking complete installations of electrical plant the partners were able by 1888 to move out of their accommodation above the workshop to board with Elizabeth and John Pollard at 24 Talbot Street in the Moss Side district. In that same year they expanded into adjacent larger premises accessed from 1A Cooke Street off Stretford Road in Hulme.

During this period Royce worked from a desk in the workshop, while Claremont had an office which he shared with the business’s office staff. By the end of 1888 Claremont, who was engaged to be married had moved into his own house, while Royce in 1889 was in his own house at 45 Barton Street in Moss Side. This allowed his mother to move in with him and he hired a servant girl, Patricia Brady to assist in the running of the house. Following his marriage Royce and his wife moved into a semi-detached house called “Easthourne” at 2 Holland Park Road. Prior to this he had moved his mother into her own accommodation at 21 Warwick Road in Chorlton-cum-Hardy where up until her death in 1904 he visited her most days on his way home from work. Following their marriages both Claremont’s wife and her sister who married Royce together invested £1,500 in their husband’s business and later increased their shareholding.

A significant uptake in the use of electricity from 1889 onwards led to an increase in the company’s turnover and profitably. The company was registered on 4 June 1891 as F. H. Royce and Co, to take over the business of electrical and mechanical engineers of the firm of the same name. The continued increase in the company’s fortunes lead Royce and Claremont to consider an expansion of the company in preparation for which in March 1894 they had a valuation performed which calculated it had assets worth £2,721 18s 4d. This inventory included the 53 machine tools or various typeshoused in their rented factory premises.

That same year they converted the business into a private limited company called F. H. Royce and Company Ltd, with the newly hired accountant John De Looze as company secretary. De Looze took over much of the administration from Claremont and Royce and was to stay until he retired from Rolls-Royce in 1943. At this time the company described itself as "Electrical and mechanical engineers and manufacturers of dynamos, motors and kindred articles." Royce was its managing director and Claremont was its chairman. Both had 5,349 shares with Claremont’s friend James Whitehead purchasing a large number of shares to provide more capital and became a director. Claremont’s wife purchased 1,131 shares and Royce’s wife 1,101. De Looze purchased one share, as did Claremont’s brother Albert. The company by now had 100 employees.

The company continued to grow though the rest of the 1890s, undertaking complete electrical installations of factories and large private houses. In 1894 they started making dynamos designed by Royce and by 1895 were producing electric cranes which required expanding into more space at Cooke Street and later the acquisition of more space in a three-storey building. As well as their highly regarded cranes, the company was manufacturing arc lamps, dynamos, electric motors and switchgear. Following the opening of the Manchester Ship Canal in 1894 they sold nine of their cranes for use on the canal as well as a major contract to supply and install the arc-lighting system for the Port of Manchester and the adjacent Trafford Park.

On 24 July 1897 Royce was awarded his first patent, which was for a bayonet-cap lamp socket. By October of that same year the company had £6,000 of orders on their books, which by March 1898 had increased to £9,000 and by February 1890 to £20,000. By the late 1890s they needed more capital to complete their work associated with the Manchester Ship Canal, while at the same time the dramatic increase in work due to this project meant that the existing factory was proving inadequate. A new factory was expected to cost £20,000, so a prospectus was issued with the aim of increasing the company’s capital to £30,000.

== Royce Ltd ==
The successful public share flotation allowed F. H. Royce & Company to be put into voluntary liquidation, then reconstructed and re-registered with enlarged capital as Royce Ltd on 17 October 1899. Royce was managing director with Claremont as chairman. At this point the company had assets of £20,664 a tenfold increase since 1894.

At the time it described itself as manufacturers of arc lamps, dynamos, meters, electrically driven cranes and hoists. Now that it has sufficient funds the company on 8 June 1901 purchased 1,200 acres (490 ha) of land beside the Manchester Ship Canal in the Trafford Park industrial park. Royce oversaw the design of the new factory, which the company moved into in 1901, though as late as 1903 they were still also using the premises at Cooke Street. The factory was directly opposite the factory of cable maker W. T. Glover whose products Royce Ltd had been using in their work associated with the Manchester Ship Canal. In 1899 its owner Henry Edmunds (1853–1927) became a director of Royce Ltd and Claremont a director of W . T. Glover following an exchange of shares between the two companies. This led to Henry Royce and Henry Edmunds becoming business associates and close friends.

His increasing wealth in the latter half of the 1890s led Royce in 1898 to commission architect Paul Ogden (1856-1940) to design for him and his wife a four-bedroom house with two bathrooms on Legh Road in the town of Knutsford, 14 miles (23 km) south-west of Manchester. Named “Brae Cottage”, it was one of the first houses to have electricity in the area, which was sourced from a generator in a small building in the garden. Besides music (in particular Gilbert and Sullivan), Royce’s favourite form of relaxation was gardening, but as he worked long hours he installed floodlights of his own design to allow him to do his gardening in the evening. The house was sold in 1907, when Royce moved to Derby.

In 1902, the company supplied electric motors for Pritchetts and Gold, a London-based battery-maker that had diversified into building electric cars.

Unfortunately, Royce’s plans for ongoing commercial growth were by curtailed by a recession after the Second Boer War in the European electrical industry. The resulting contraction in their home market caused German manufacturers to sharply lower the prices of their products on the United Kingdom market. Simultaneously there was increased competition from companies such as General Electric Company (GEC), British Thomson-Houston which was majority owned by General Electric of America, and the entry of the American Westinghouse (via its subsidiary British Westinghouse Electric and Manufacturing Co) into the United Kingdom market also impacted on Royce Ltd’s profitability. For instance, the price of electrical motors had fallen by over 50% by 1905. In response the company attempted to remain competitive by lowering its costs, while maintaining Royce’s personal belief in quality. The financial stress in combination with Royce’s prediliction for working long hours began to show. As his friend was vital to the success of the company Claremont on medical advice attempted to get Royce out to enjoy the fresh air. To assist in this, on the doctor’s suggestion Claremont purchased a small De Dion-Bouton four-wheeler to make it easier for Royce to commute between his home and the factory. Despite this in 1902 Royce had a nervous collapse. In response to the insistence of the other directors and his wife that he needed a rest, Royce accompanied her on a sea voyage to South Africa to visit her relatives. After ten weeks of no contact with the company a refreshed Royce returned to the United Kingdom in late 1902.

With the establishment of Rolls-Royce in 1906 Henry Royce’s involvement in Royce Ltd began to diminish and he soon had little active involvement in the company. When the car business was moved to Derby in 1907 Royce Ltd remained in Trafford Park, continuing to manufacture electrically driven cranes, hoists, capstans and winches. Claremont continued as its chairman until his death, upon which he was succeeded by his brother Albert Claremont.

Although a respected crane-making business, whose products had a reputation for reliability and longevity and were exported around the world, it had become unprofitable in the 1920's and was kept afloat by Royce's other business interests. It was acquired by rival crane maker Herbert Morris Ltd in November 1932. They moved the factory to Loughborough and continued manufacturing Royce branded cranes, still to Royce designs, until 16 November 1964. A number of Royce cranes are still in use, including one at Rolls-Royce’s factory at Nightingale Road in Derby.

In 2002 the now Morris Material Handling Ltd revived the Royce name to enter the American crane market.

== Begins manufacturing automobiles ==
It is not known whether it was upon his own initiative or it was the efforts of Claremont and the consulting doctor to get Royce out in the fresh air, but either prior to his South African holiday or upon his return a better motorcar than the rather basic De Dion-Bouton was purchased by Royce. It is known that by around September 1902 Royce had in his library The Automobile: Its Construction and Management by Gérard Lavergne, indicating an interest in the subject of motorcars. It is not known whether Royce's new interest in automobiles was due to his fascination for all things mechanical or whether he was considering the automobile as a potential new product for the company to compensate for the decline in its electrical business.

Royce’s choice of car was a 1901 model two cylinder Decauville which he purchased in 1902 or 1903. Decauville had a good reputation at the time but the car failed to start when Royce collected it from the Manchester’s Goods Station. He had to hire four men to push it through the streets to the Royce factory at Cooke Street, where after fixing the fault he drove it home. As he began using it, he found that it did not meet his high standards and so he began making improvements. With space now available at Cooke Street as the manufacturing of the company’s crane was by now being undertaken at Trafford Park, Royce suggested to the other directors that the company construct three experimental cars to investigate whether the company should expand into the manufacture of motorcars. Claremont and follow director, works manager R. D. Hulley were not supportive.

Despite this Royce decided to proceed and in May 1903 assigned A. J. Adam. a Mr Shipley and Ernie Wooler to assist him in the design, while undertaking the actual construction was Ernie Mills, with the assistance of two electrical apprentices, Thomas Shaw “Tommy” Haldenby (1886-1964) and Eric Platford. Using detailed notes and drawings he had made of every component on the Decauville Royce refined everything to create three new cars all bearing the nameplate "Royce". They featured a two-cylinder 10 hp engine, three speed gearbox, a differential rather than a chain drive, a more effective radiator, improved exhaust system, improved electrics and improved carburation based on the Krebs system and a larger water tank. He also made close attention to reducing his automobile’s overall weight, by using lighter stronger materials and by dispensing with the Decauville’s cast bronze warning bell which weighed 40 pounds (18 kg). While most work was done in-house, some work such as heavy forging and the road springs was contracted out. The team typically started work at 8am on a Monday and 6.30am on the other weekdays and work right though Friday night until noon on Saturday.

Testing of the first engine on a dynamo began on 16 September 1903. The first assembled car was completed by 1 April 1904 and taken by Royce for a 30 miles (48 km) drive to his home in Knutsford and back. A week later it was dispatched to a coachbuilder to have a body fitted. The other two cars were completed and fitted with bodies soon after. After initially being assigned the first car Claremont was given the second car to use. Initially he often had a horse-drawn Hansom cab follow behind in case the car failed to proceed.

== Partnership with Rolls ==
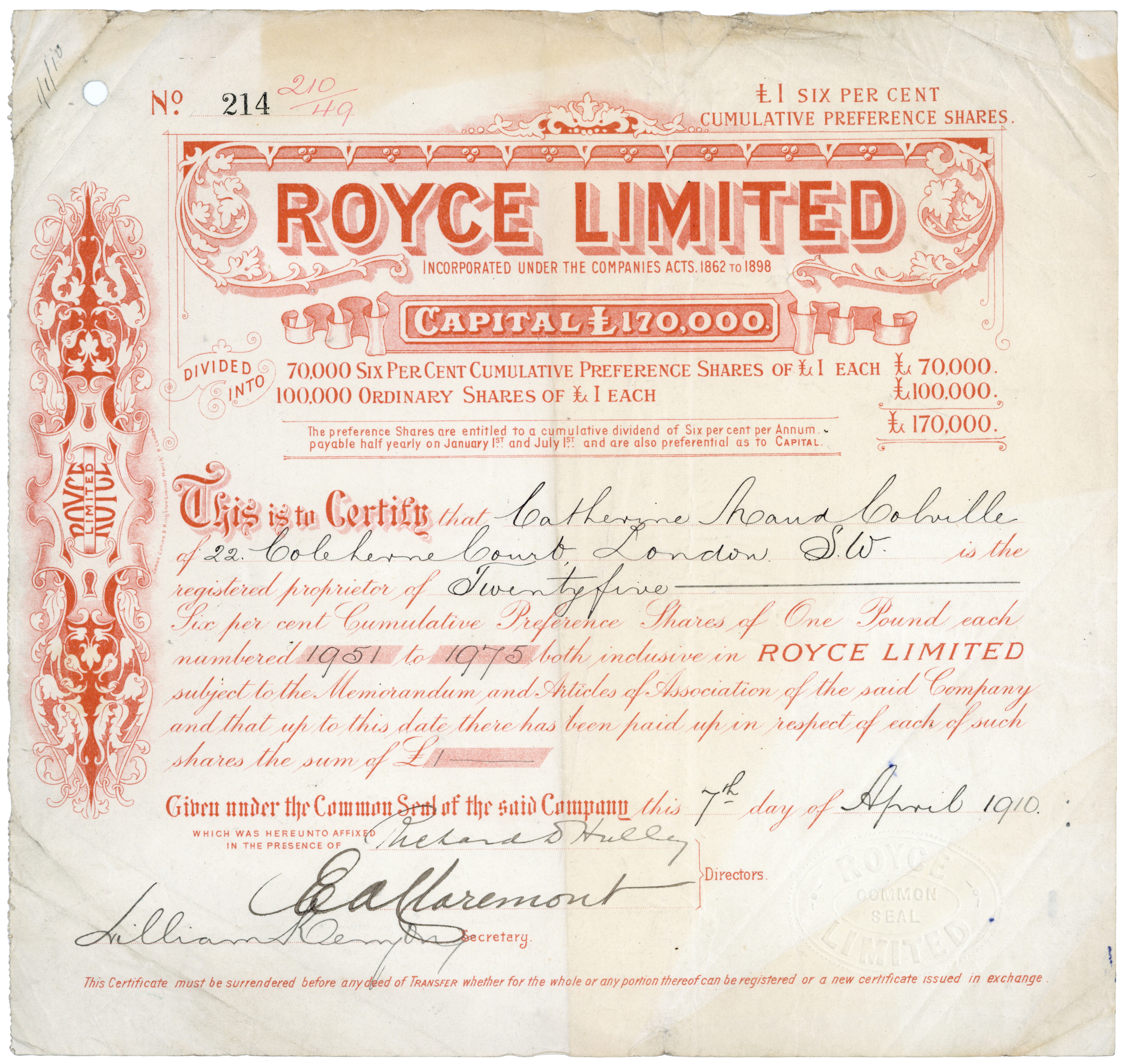
Stock certificate of the Royce Limited for 25 Preference Shares of £1 each, issued 7 April 1910, signed in original by Ernest Alexander Claremont as President. The company was incorporated on 4 June 1894 by Sir Frederick Henry Royce under the name of F. H. Royce and Co, Limited. On 17 October 1899 the company was reorganised as Royce, Limited.

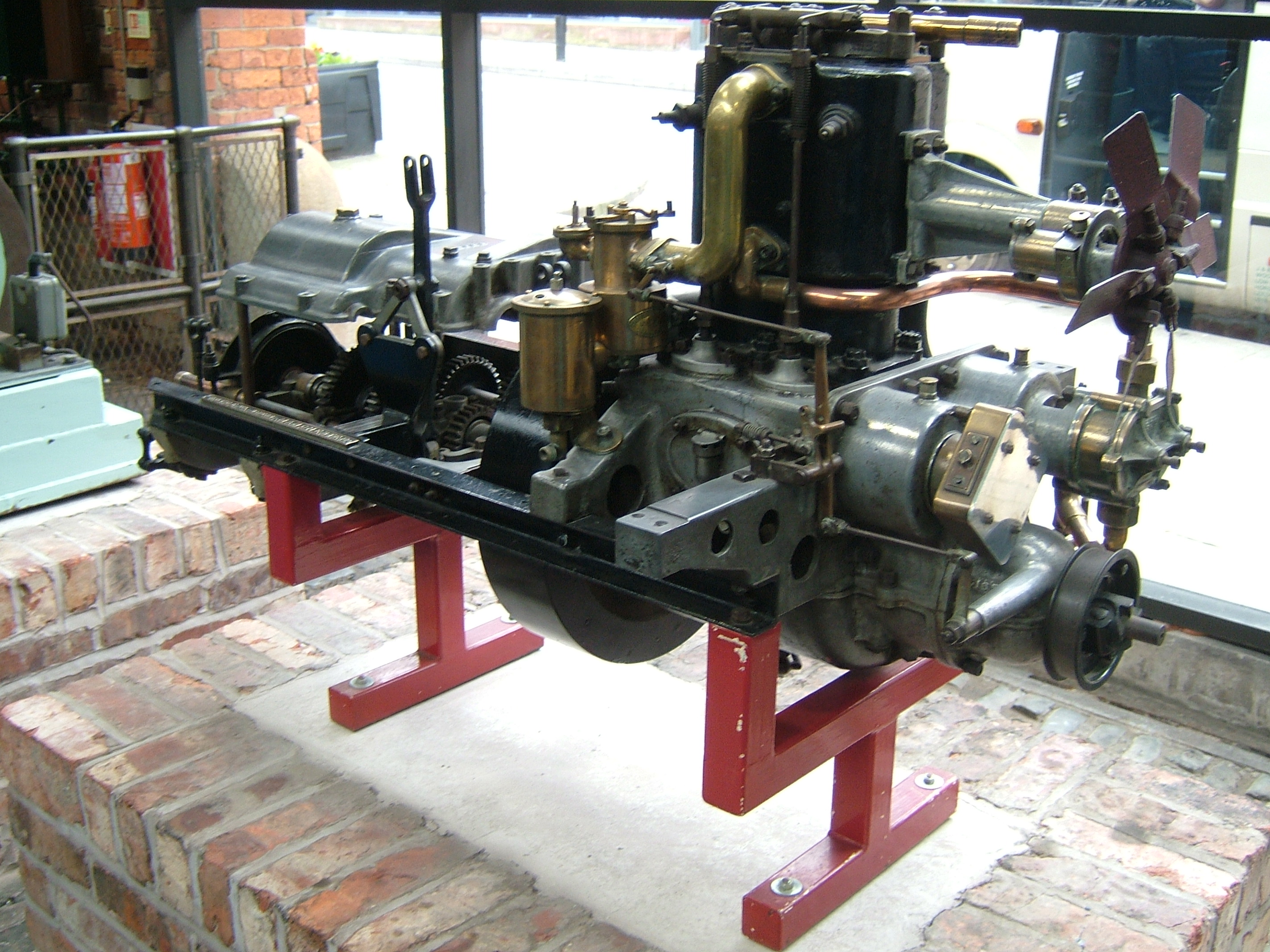
Engine and gearbox of Royce's second car, now in MOSI, Manchester

The third Royce car had been sold to one of the other directors, Henry Edmunds. Edmunds was a friend of Charles Rolls who had a car showroom in London selling imported models and showed him his car and arranged the historic meeting between Rolls and Royce possibly at the newly opened Midland Hotel, but more likely at the Great Central Refreshment Rooms near Manchester London Road Station, on 4 May 1904. In spite of his preference for three- or four-cylinder cars, Rolls was impressed with the two-cylinder Royce 10. In an agreement reached on 23 December 1904 it was agreed that Royce would exclusively supply C.S. Rolls and Co with a 10 hp two-cylinder, with the range expanding to include 15 hp three-cylinder, 20 hp four-cylinder and 30hp six-cylinder models. All were to be as badged as Rolls-Royce, and were sold in framed chassis form for the customer to arrange his own body supplier, with London coachbuilder Barker & Co. recommended.

From its establishment Rolls-Royce didn’t produce complete cars until the introduction of the Silver Dawn in 1949. Instead, they produced a framed chassis with engine, gearbox and transmission, to which a body was fitted by a variety of coachbuilding companies, including Barker & Co., Hooper, H. J. Mulliner & Co., Park Ward and James Young.

The first Rolls-Royce cars, the 10 hp, 15 hp, 20 hp as well as the engine for the 30 hp were unveiled at the Paris Salon in December 1904. As the new three-cylinder 15 hp engine was not ready the chassis was incomplete. The 10 hp was similar to the earlier Royce car, but with further design and mechanical improvements. In 1905, Royce designed a V-8. Only three were produced, of which one was sold before later being taken back by the company.

In 1906 Rolls and Royce formalised their partnership by creating Rolls-Royce Limited, which was registered on 15 March 1906 with capital of £60,000. Royce was appointed chief engineer and works director on a salary of £1,250 per annum plus 4% of the profits in excess of £10,000. In comparison, Rolls received £750 per annum and 4% of the profits. Royce thus provided the technical expertise to complement Rolls' financial backing and business acumen. To increase the company’s capital to £200,000 it was floated on the Birmingham Stock Exchange on 11 December 1906, with £100,000 of shares made available to the public to acquire the business of C.S. Rolls & Co. However by the day before the flotation it was apparent that only £41,000 of the required minimum subscription of £50,000 shares had been subscribed to. Of these, Royce had purchased £10,000. The issue was resolved by company secretary John De Looze rushing from Manchester to Harrodgate to see wealthy businessman Arthur Harry Briggs, who had purchased the first “Light Twenty” car. Briggs agreed to purchase £10,000 worth of shares and in return was given a seat on the board. On 9 January 1907, it was announced that £63,000 had been raised.

== Rolls-Royce Silver Ghost ==
Claude Johnson at the wheel of the Rolls-Royce Silver Ghost, 1907. Its Barker body was painted silver and the name "The Silver Ghost" was to emphasise its "extraordinary stealthiness". It was driven continuously for some 15,000 miles back and forth between London and Glasgow under the supervision of RAC observers to demonstrate its reliability.

During 1906 Royce commenced the development of a completely new six-cylinder model with more power than the Rolls-Royce 30 hp. Initially designated the 40/50 hp, this was Rolls-Royce's first all-new model as the earlier models had been based on Royce’s Decauville. It was first exhibited at the London Motor Show in November 1906. The release was premature as during testing it began experiencing water seepage into its cylinder. Royce experienced this first hand when the test car he was driving failed and he had to hire a horse to tow it to his home. The following Monday he grabbed a sledge hammer upon arriving at the factory and used it to attack the new six-cylinder engine blocks, shouting that they had to start again. While the problem was quickly solved by utilizing a different type of casting method, it delayed the model’s release until April 1907.

In March 1908, Claude Johnson succeeded in persuading Royce and the other directors that Rolls-Royce should concentrate exclusively on the Silver Ghost, which led to all the earlier models being discontinued. Johnson also felt that this would reduce the workload on Royce to one automobile, rather than being spread across several. The 40/50 was soon to unofficially acquire among the press and public the name Silver Ghost. The Silver Ghost was the origin of Rolls-Royce's claim of making the "best car in the world" – a phrase coined not by themselves, but by the prestigious publication Autocar in 1907.

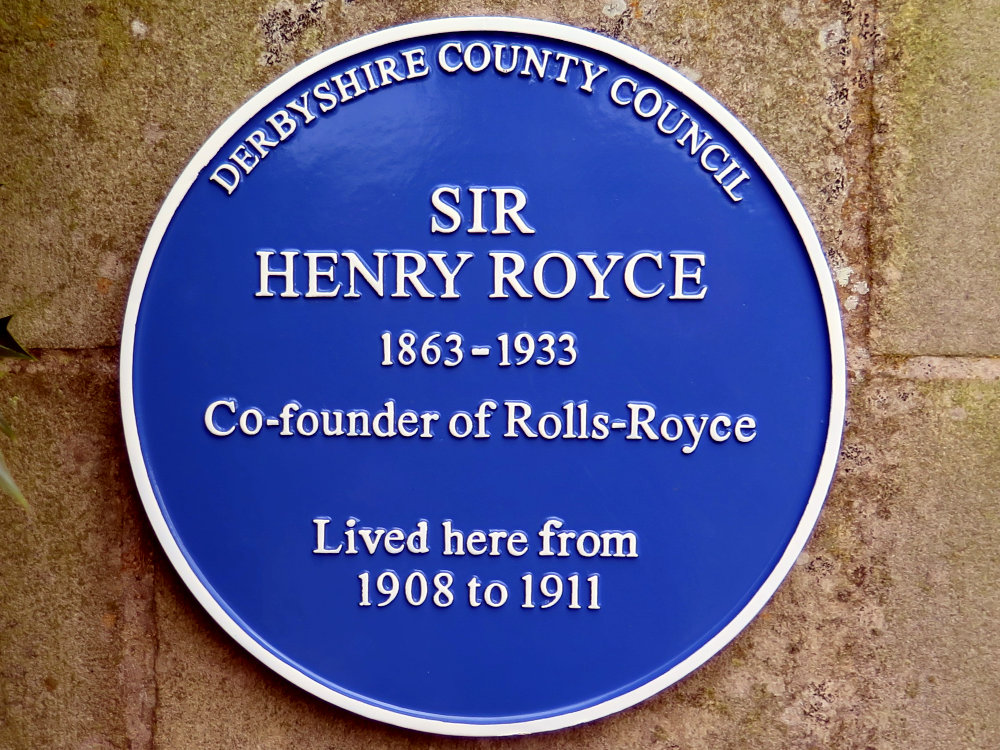
Outside Quarndon House, Royce's blue plaque

Upon relocation to Derby in 1908 Royce rented a property on its outskirts called “The Knoll” in the village of Quarndon from 1908 to 1911. Located on the Common it has since been re-named Quarndon House.

By 1909 it was apparent to Johnson that the workload imposed on Royce by the development of the Silver Ghost and the creation of the company’s new factory at Derby needed to be addressed as he was Rolls-Royce’s most valuable asset. At the time it was not uncommon for Royce to work 36 hours without stopping. In September 1907 Royce fell sick and was forced to miss a number of directors' meetings. He was well enough by 9 July 1908 to attend the official opening of the Derby factory. He was also becoming increasing autocratic and was prone to firing an employee whose work had dissatisfied him, only for the works foreman to usually quietly reinstate him. At the time, Royce worked from a small office on the factory floor, so to try and limit Royce's interference in the smooth running of production activities, and at the same time reduce his workload, Johnson convinced him to give up the position of Works Director and instead become the Engineer-in-Chief.

== Collapse of Royce ==
Although by the time of his death, on 12 July 1910 in a crash of his Wright Flyer aircraft, Rolls had little direct involvement with Rolls-Royce, he was still on the Board of Directors, having attended his last board meeting on 8 July. His death was still a shock to the company and in particular to Royce, bringing on a physical collapse, which was generally attributed to his workaholic nature and poor eating habits.

Claude Johnson immediately arranged for Royce to be taken south to be examined by the best doctors in London. It is believed that they diagnosed him as having bowel cancer and undertook a major operation. Claremont, like Royce, also suffered from issues with his digestive system, which he attributed to the pair in their early days in business cooking their food in their workshops enamelling oven. After the operation, they gave Royce three months to live. Johnson thought they were being too pessimistic, as Royce soon indicated signs he was recovering. Royce was taken to the small village of Overstrand near Cromer in Norfolk to provide him with as much peace and quiet as possible. With it obvious that Royce’s wife was incapable of looking after him, Johnson hired a nurse, Ethel "Auby" Aubin. Once it became apparent to the doctors that Royce was making a remarkable recovery, they advised that should be taken to a warmer climate.

Johnson agreed, and decided that he should personally oversee Royce’s immediate care. Lord Herbert Scott agreed to fill in for Johnson as General Managing Director, while management of the Derby factory was entrusted to Thomas Haldenby and Arthur Wormald (1874-1936), who since 1904 had been the joint Works Manager. Eric Platford was made responsible for quality control. With the company in the hands of people he could trust, Johnson travelled to Tours in France he met up with Royce and Aubin who had travelled there via London and Dover. A Silver Ghost with a closed body conveyed the combined party across France and down though Italy from where they travelled to Egypt where they spent the winter. In the spring, they returned to the Cote d’Azur and took up residence in Johnson’s house “Villa Jaune’ on top of a hill in the village of Le Canadel. Royce fell in love with the view and after expressing a desire to live here, Johnson purchased land below his own property for Royce. Subsequently a house called “La Villa Mimosa” was constructed and the property landscaped to Royce’s designs.

With Royce invigorated by the experience, Johnson decided that the best way forward was to keep Royce away from the stressful factory environment at Derby, where he wouldn’t have been able to keep himself from getting involved in every detail. In this way, he could utilize Royce’s design talents for as long as possible. Johnson and Royce agreed in a devolved arrangement where Royce would spend the winter in Le Canadel and the summer in a quiet location in the south of England. In both locations he would have a small personal design team to translate his design ideas into a form that could then be converted into formal production drawings at the main drawing office in Derby. As a result Johnson commissioned the construction of another house below “La Villa Mimosa” for Royce’s design team. In the early summer of 1912 while Johnson resumed his duties in Derby, Royce returned to England and took up residence at Westwood near Crowborough in East Sussex. Westwood was to be his summer residence in 1912 and 1913. Here his wife rejoined him, along with her niece. This did not make for a happy environment. Royce and Aubin departed for Le Canadel, where he suffered an reoccurrence of his intestinal issues. He was urgently conveyed back to London in an ambulance converted from a 40/50. Once in London Royce had a colostomy operation and recuperated in a nursing home, where Aubin took 24-hour charge, sleeping on a camp bed in his room. Once he was fit enough Royce returned to Westwood, but the domestic environment proved to still be intolerable. Accompanied by Aubin, Royce departed for Le Canadel, leaving his wife behind in Westwood. As far as is known they never lived together again.

When he returned from Le Canadel in 1914 Royce rented a house called “Westward Ho!” in St Margaret’s Bay, near where Johnson had a home. Royce spent the winter of 1914-15 in a hotel in Bognor Regis, before buying a house called Seaton in St Margaret’s Bay.

Royce insisted on checking all new designs, and engineers and draughtsmen had to send the drawings to be personally checked by him, a daunting prospect with his well-known perfectionism. Under the new devolved arrangement Royce and his personal design team alternated between Le Canadel and the south of England as Royce led them in continuously improving the 40/50. Executives and engineers from Derby and London would visit and often bringing with them a chassis over which to discuss with the team any modifications being undertaken.

== First World War ==
Following the start of the First World War, Royce began designing Rolls-Royce's first aircraft engine, the Rolls-Royce Eagle, which was introduced in 1915. This was a major commitment for both Royce given his health and he signalled his seriousness by reducing his salary as his contribution to the war effort. Rolls-Royce had a Daimler-Mercedes DF80 7½-litre water-cooled engine in their procession at Derby and for the first time since 1911 Royce travelled to Derby on 9 August 1914 to inspect it as he considered how to proceed with the design of the Eagle. He was allowed only an hour with the engine, which he somehow managed to extend by another hour before Aubin insisted he stop. The Eagle proved to be one of only two aero engines made by the Allies that was neither a production nor a technical failure. Using the experience gained with the Eagle Royce oversaw the development of three further engines. The Falcon (which was designed by Robert Harvey-Bailey), the Hawk and the Condor.

As Royce felt he needed a more economical car for his personal use during the war and admired the designs of Ettore Bugatti, Royce had Arthur Elliot, who was a member of his design team go to London and purchase on his behalf a small second-hand Bugatti. It ran badly and caught fire on the trip while departing the city. Despite this it was bought back to St Margaret’s Bay, where Royce tuned it to his satisfaction and used it for the rest of the war.

== Moves to West Wittering ==
As the situation at St Margaret’s Bay deteriorated due to food and household materials, regular security scares due to the military camps in the area and bombardment of nearby Dover by German warships Royce decided in late 1917 to find a better location. Accompanied by Aubin and a list of available properties Royce went hunting in his personal Silver Ghost along the South coast. Eventually the pair decided on a property called “Elm Tree Farm” in the rural village of West Wittering, which had no electricity and was approximately 8 miles from Chichester. Renamed "Elmstead" it was to remain Royce’s summer home until his death. The two-storey house had a lawn in front and a large garden, as well as several acres of meadows.

As well as his secretary R.L. “Monty” Marmont and driver Frank Dodd, Royce had a personal design team split into two groupings; engine and chassis, all of whom moved with him between Le Canadel and West Wittering. The engine design team consisted of senior engine designer Albert G. Elliot, draughtsman Donald Eyre, draughtsman Charles Carolin (who left in 1921), engine designer Charles L. “Chas” Jenner, senior designer S. F. “Sammy” Pottinger (from 1918) as well as gears and gearbox designer A. John Stent (who left in 1925). The chassis team which was established in West Wittering in 1921 consisted of designers Bernard Incledon Day, W. G. “Bill” Hardy and H. Ivan F. Evernden. From the late 1920s, Tony Bastow, H. E. “Harry” Biraben and A. E. “Tony” Cook joined the establishment as juniors. At "Elmstead" Royce’s secretary worked from an upstairs office adjacent to Royce’s bedroom, while downstairs two small reception rooms were allocated to the engine design team. The chassis design team was accommodated ¼ mile away in a studio that had been converted from a barn on the grounds of a cottage called “Camacha.” which was rented from a Miss Ramsey. In addition at an adjacent property called ”The Piggery”, a barn housed a small workshop and Royce’s cars. Messages between the two locations were carried by Marmont on a bicycle until Royce allowed the installation of a telephone. The design team lodged around the village, but due to its isolation their recreation was limited to swimming, tennis and badminton.

== Schneider Trophy ==
In October 1928, he began design of the "R" engine while walking with some of his leading engineers on the beach at West Wittering, sketching ideas in the sand. Less than a year later, the "R” engine, designed in his studio in the village, set a new world air speed record of 357.7 miles per hour and won the Schneider Trophy of 1929. As the racing was nearby Royce was able to watch it with binoculars from on top of a haystack near his house.

When the Ramsay MacDonald government decided not to finance the next attempt in 1931, Lucy, Lady Houston, felt that Britain must not be left out of this contest and sent a telegram to the Prime Minister stating that she would guarantee £100,000, if necessary, towards the cost leading the Government to reverse their previous decision. The result was that Royce found that the "R" could be made to produce more power and the Supermarine S.6B seaplane won the Trophy at 340.08 mph (547.31 km/h) on 13 September 1931. Later that month on 29 September, the same aircraft with an improved engine flew at 407.5 mph (655.8 km/h), becoming the first craft to fly at over 400 mph (640 km/h) and breaking the world's speed record.

== Bentley and Merlin ==
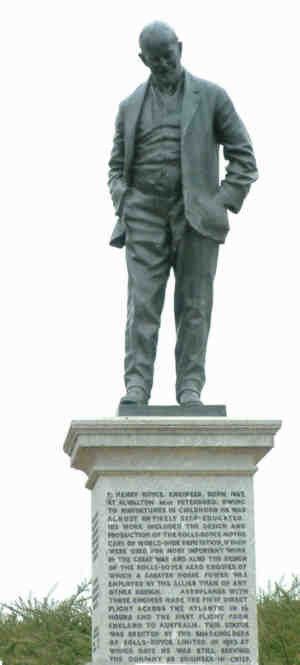
Statue of Sir Henry Royce, standing outside the company's HQ at Moor Lane, Derby

In 1931, Rolls-Royce Ltd. bought out their rival firm of W. O. Bentley. A "20/25" engine was put into a chassis and a Bentley radiator fitted. An open four-seater body completed the picture. The engine was "hotted-up" and the car was taken down to West Wittering to get Royce's approval. They were somewhat apprehensive of what he would say, but he gave it his blessing. He told them that such a fast car should have a means by which the driver could adjust the stiffness of the suspension whilst they were driving, to suit the road conditions

A few years later the Royce conceived driver adjustable dampers evolved into a ground breaking "ride control" system which automatically adjusted the stiffness of the dampers to match the speed of the car - softer at low speed for better comfort and increasingly stiffer as the car went faster to provide better stability and response. In addition to this automatic control, the driver was still provided with a steering wheel mounted adjustment to tune the range of damping stiffness to suit their preference.

Following the success of the "R” engine, it was clear that they had an engine that would be of use to the Royal Air Force. As no Government assistance was forthcoming at first, in the national interest they went ahead with development of what was called the "PV-12" engine (standing for Private Venture, 12-cylinder). The idea was to produce an engine of about the same performance as the "R”, albeit with a much longer life. Rolls-Royce launched the PV-12 in October 1933 and the engine completed its first test in 1934, the year after Royce died. The PV-12 became the Rolls-Royce Merlin engine.

== Death ==
By late 1921 Royce’s health began to deteriorate and he had to spend increasing periods in bed. He died at his house, Elmstead, in West Witteringon 22 April 1933. The night before he died he sat up in bed and drew a sketch on the back of an envelope which he gave to his nurse Ethel Aubin telling her to see that the "boys" in the factory got it safely. He died before it reached Derby. This was the adjustable shock-absorber.

== Personal life ==
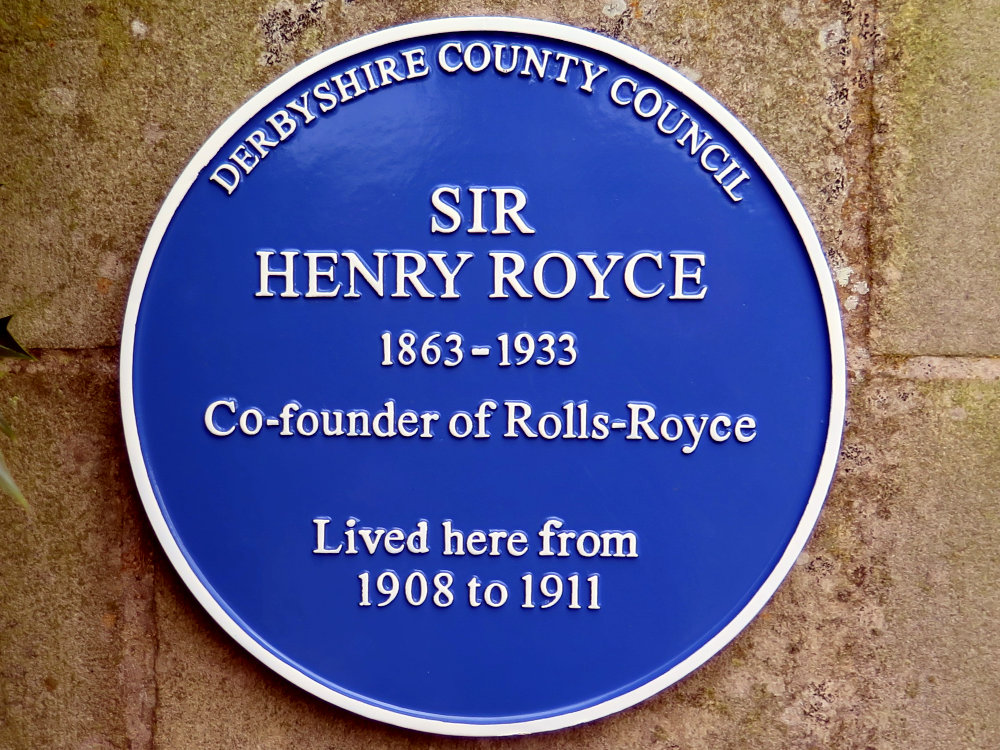
Royce's blue plaque in Quarndon, Derbyshire

Royce was notorious for working long hours and poor eating habits. To ensure he ingest something company secretary John De Looze had boys regularly take him glasses of milk, with instructions not to return until they had seen Royce drink it.

Royce married Minnie Grace Punt, sister of his business partner Claremont, on 16 March 1893 at the Church of St Andrew in Willesden, Middlesex, England, when Royce was 29 years old. The death of the sister’s father, Alfred a licensed victualler left them both financially secure. Both sisters disliked emotional and physical intimacy, and had a fear of becoming pregnant. Royce and his wife separated in 1912. With their marriage at an end in 1912 his wife remained in Westwood until 1921 with Royce continuing to financially support her until her death, including after she left Westwood, purchasing for her a house called “Woodside” in Boxhill.

Following his serious illness in 1911 his nurse Ethel Aubin took increasing control of Royce’s private life. Her concern for his wellbeing and professional skills allowed Royce to live for a further 22 years from when she entered his life. In his will Royce stated "my nurse for over 20 years, and who has done so much to prolong my life", and left her his house Elmstead, its lands and furniture, as well as two-fifths of his remaining estate in trust. He also left his wife two-fifths of his estate in trust.

As per Royce’s request there were no mourners or flowers at his funeral and only two were allowed at his cremation, George Henry Richards Tildesley who was a partners in his solicitors, Claremont Haynes and Albert Claremont. He left custody of his ashes to Aubin. His cremated remains were initially buried under his statue at the Rolls-Royce works in Derby, but in 1937 his urn was removed to the parish church of Alwalton, his birthplace.

In 1935 Aubin married Tildesley, though the couple had separated by 1937.

== Honours ==
Royce, who lived by the motto "Whatever is rightly done, however humble, is noble", was appointed OBE in 1918, and was created a baronet, of Seaton in the County of Rutland, in 1930 for his services to British Aviation. As he had no children, the baronetcy became extinct on his death.

== Memorials ==
In 1962, a memorial window dedicated to his memory was unveiled in Westminster Abbey. The window is one of a series designed by Ninian Comper dedicated to the memory of eminent engineers. He is also commemorated in Royce Hall, student accommodation at Loughborough University, and until 2011 at one of Peterborough's Queensgate shopping centre car parks. The Sir Henry Royce Suite, a business suite, is named after him at the Peterborough Marriott Hotel in the Alwalton business park.

The Henry Royce Institute, the United Kingdom’s national institute for advanced materials research and innovation with its headquarters in Manchester, is named after him.

== Cultural depictions ==
Michael Jayston portrayed Royce in the 1972–1973 BBC Television miniseries The Edwardians.

== Bibliography ==
- Bird, Anthony; Hallows, Ian (1984). The Rolls-Royce Motor Car and the Bentley since 1931 (5 ed.). New York: St. Martin’s Press. ISBN 0-312-68957-8. (1st edition 1964)
- Clarke, Tom C. (1995). Ernest Claremont: A Manchester life with Rolls-Royce and W.T. Glover & Co. Manchester: Hulme Press. ISBN 0-9526391-0-6.
- Clarke, Tom C. (2003). Royce and the Vibration Damper. Technical Series. Rolls-Royce Heritage Trust. ISBN 1-872922-18-X. Nº 6.
- Evans, M. H. (2004). In the Beginning - The Manchester Origins of Rolls-Royce. Rolls-Royce Heritage Trust. ISBN 1-872922-27-9. Nº 4.
- Pemberton, Max (1936). The Life of Sir Henry Royce: Bart., M.I.E.E., M.I.M.E: With some chapters from the stories of the late Charles S. Rolls and Claude Johnson (Hardcover). London: Selwyn & Blount.
- Pugh, Peter (2001). The Magic of a Name – The Rolls-Royce Story: The First 40 Years. Icon Books. ISBN 1-84046-151-9.
- Reese, Peter (2022). Sir Henry Royce: Establishing Rolls-Royce, from Motor Cars to Aero Engines (Softcover). Cheltenham, Gloucestershire: The History Press. ISBN 978-0-7509-9900-7.
- Rowland, John (1969). The Rolls-Royce Men: The Story of C.S. Rolls and Henry Royce. New York: Roy Publishers.
- Tritton, Paul (2006). The Life and Times of Henry Edmunds: Pioneer, Entrepreneur and 'Godfather of Rolls-Royce' (Softcover). Rolls-Royce Heritage Trust. ISBN 978-1872922331. Nº 38.

Baronetage of the United Kingdom
New creation	Baronet (of Seaton); 1930–1933	Extinct
