= Decauville automobile =

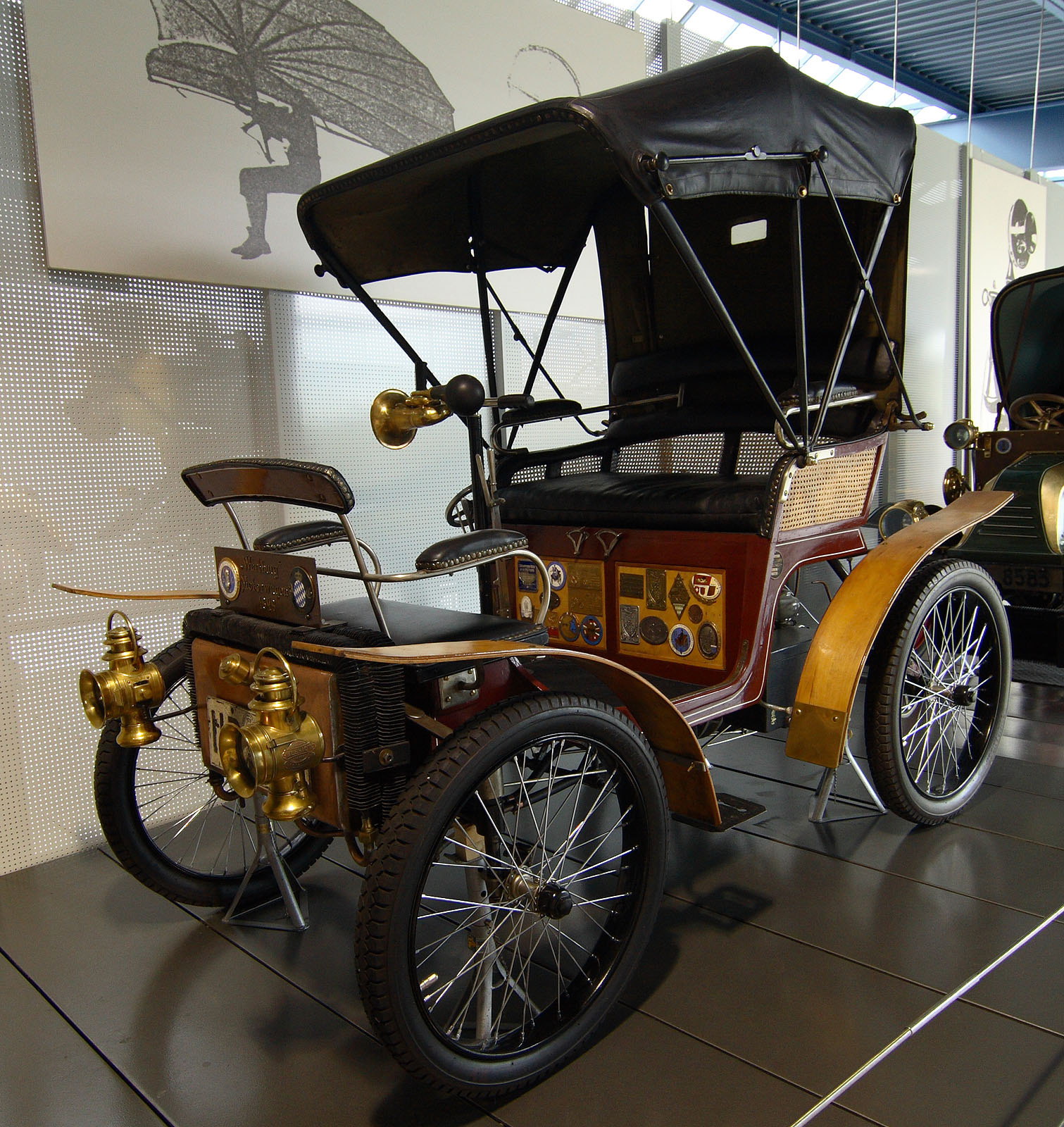
Decauville, license-produced as a Wartburg (from 1898)

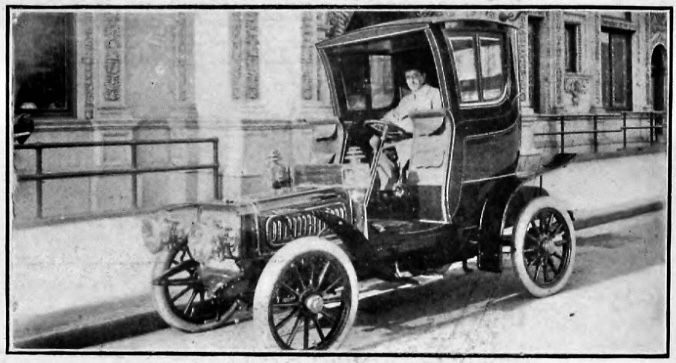
Decauville 12-16 (1905)

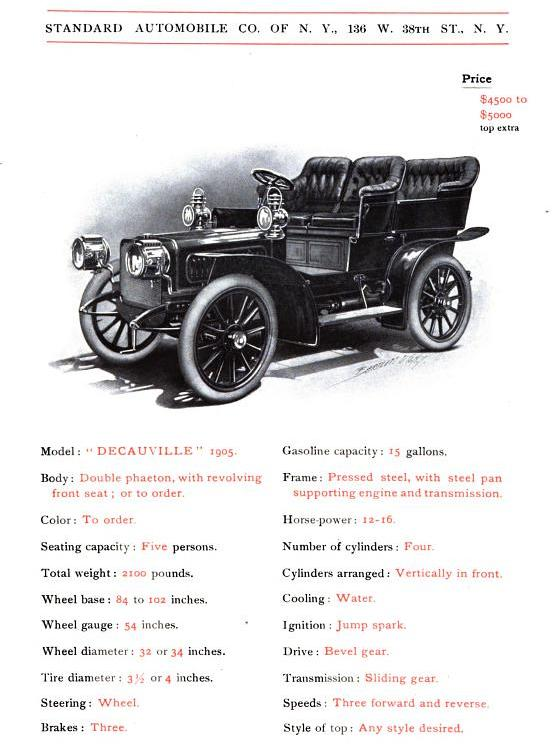
1905 Decauville Double Phaeton (US Import)

Voitures automobiles Decauville was a French automobile maker, a subsidiary of Société Decauville, a company already famous for producing locomotives, located at Petit-Bourg, near Corbeil.

Established by Paul Decauville, the company was registered as Société des Voitures Automobiles Decauville in 1897 and the factory started producing automobiles in 1898. The first car was designed by Messrs Joseph Guédon and Gustave Cornilleau and the design was purchased for 250,000 French francs. Cornilleau was also taken on as chief engineer.

The car, a tiller-steered three-seater in the voiturette (cyclecar) class, was called a voiturelle. It had a peculiar structure, it featured independent suspension by transverse spring and two single-cylinder air-cooled engines produced by De Dion-Bouton sharing a common crankcase. The 498 cc (30.4 cu in) engine, allegedly producing 3 hp (2.2 kW; 3.0 PS), was mounted under the seat and drove the back axle through an unlubricated two-speed transmission. It had an advanced sliding-pillar front suspension, but no suspension at all in the rear.

Like many pioneer marques, including Napier and Bentley, Decauville entered motor races, winning the voiturette class of the 1898 Paris–Amsterdam–Paris Trail. Works drivers M. Gabriel and Léon Théry came first and second, with another Decauville third, in the voiturette class of the 1899 Tour de France Automobile. This was followed with class wins in the 1900 Bordeaux-Biarritz and Paris-Rouen-Paris rallies. The marque also took the Daily Mail prize in the 1900 English Thousand Miles Trial.

This car sold well, supplying 107 cars by 1898 and 350 by 1904. Beginning in 1899, it was being sold in England by R. Moffat Ford, and being built under licence by Automobilwerk Eisenach (as the Wartburg) in Germany and Orio and Marchand in Italy.

The original model was joined in 1900 by a 5 hp (3.7 kW; 5.1 PS) water-cooled model and shortly an 8 hp (6.0 kW; 8.1 PS) twin with "horseshoe-shaped dashboard radiator and a bullet-nosed bonnet". In 1901, a 3-liter four (two 8 hp (6.0 kW; 8.1 PS) twins mounted in tandem) was offered.

In 1902, the voiturelles were dropped and a 10 hp (7.5 kW; 10 PS) 2,090 cc (128 cu in) sidevalve twin debuted, featuring engine, gearbox, and clutch cast as a unit. One of these, purchased by Henry Royce, inspired his design for the first Rolls-Royce.

From 1905, the company produced larger models with four-cylinder engines. The customer could choose the engine type from 2.7 to 9.2 litres. A range of trucks and buses was also made.

By 1906, the company offered five distinct models, all fours: 12/16 (which actually produced 20.14 hp (15.02 kW; 20.42 PS)), 16/20, 24/28, 30 hp (22 kW; 30 PS) (also producing more than its rated tax horsepower), and 45 hp (34 kW; 46 PS) (with chain drive, at a cost of £1020 ready to run).

Demand for its cars fell, and in 1907, Decauville dropped the 12/16 and 16/20. Sales fell still further, and Decauville was forced to close its automobile factory in 1911. The parent company, Société Decauville continued to produce locomotives.

== Production models ==
- Decauville 16/20 CV
- Decauville 24/28 CV

== Surviving cars ==
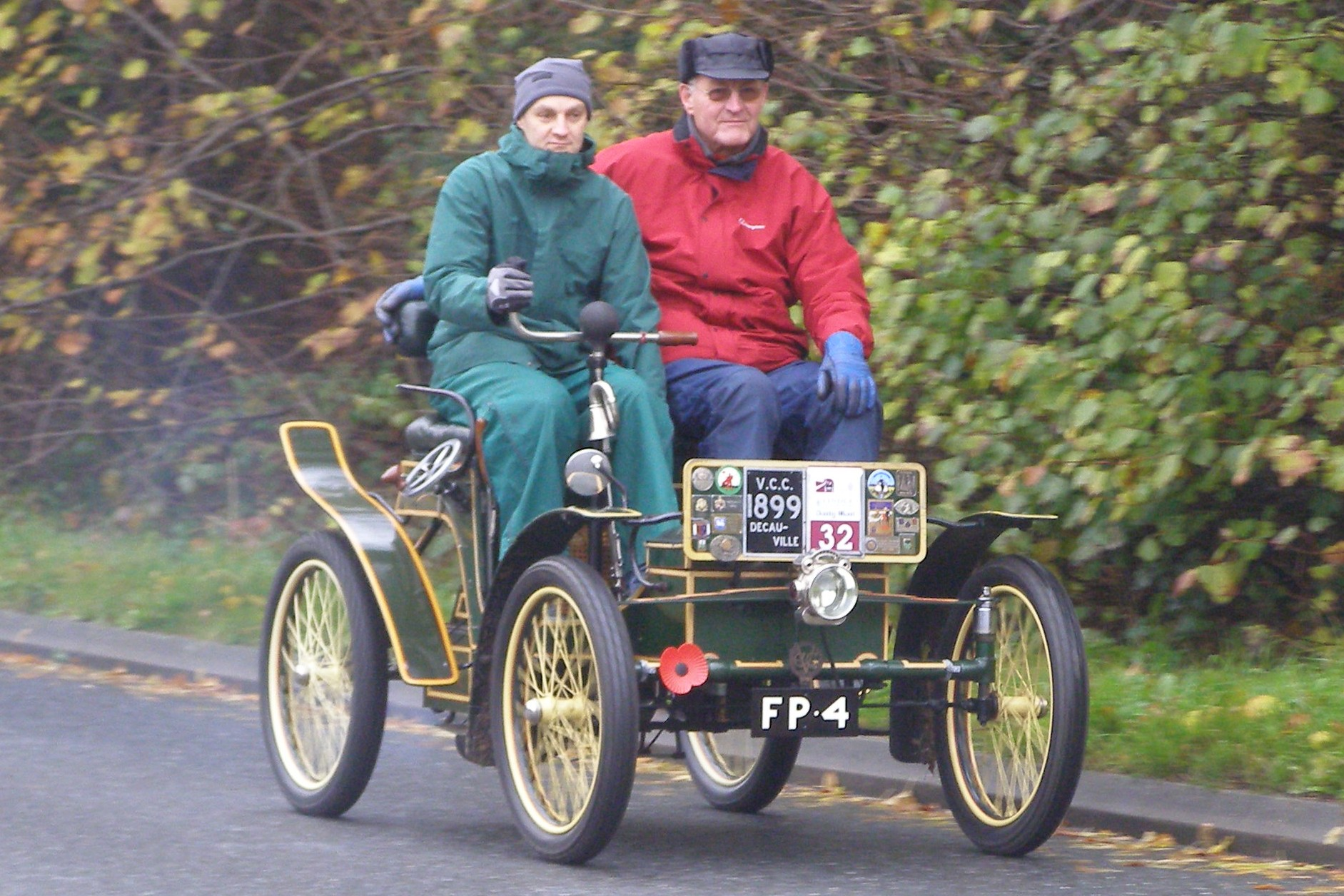
An 1899 Decauville Voiturelle with a vis-a-vis body on the 2008 London to Brighton Veteran Car Run

- A Decauville Voiturelle from 1898 may be seen in the Musée Automobile de Vendée in Talmont-Saint-Hilaire, France
- A Decauville Voiturelle Vis-à-Vis from 1899 is in the Musée Henri Malartre in Rochetaillée-sur-Saône, France
- A Decauville from 1900 is in the Aalholm Automobile Museum in Nysted, Denmark (this museum closed in 2008)
- A Decauville 10 HP Tonneau belonging to the National Motor Museum in Beaulieu, Hampshire, United Kingdom, has been a regular participant at the London to Brighton Veteran Car Run, last attending in 2010 (No. 143)
- Another Decauville Voiturelle, ca. 1899, from Belgium, participated in the 2010 London-Brighton Run (No. 35)

== See also ==
- Three pictures of Decauville locomotives
