= Artillery wheel =

19th century style of gun carriage

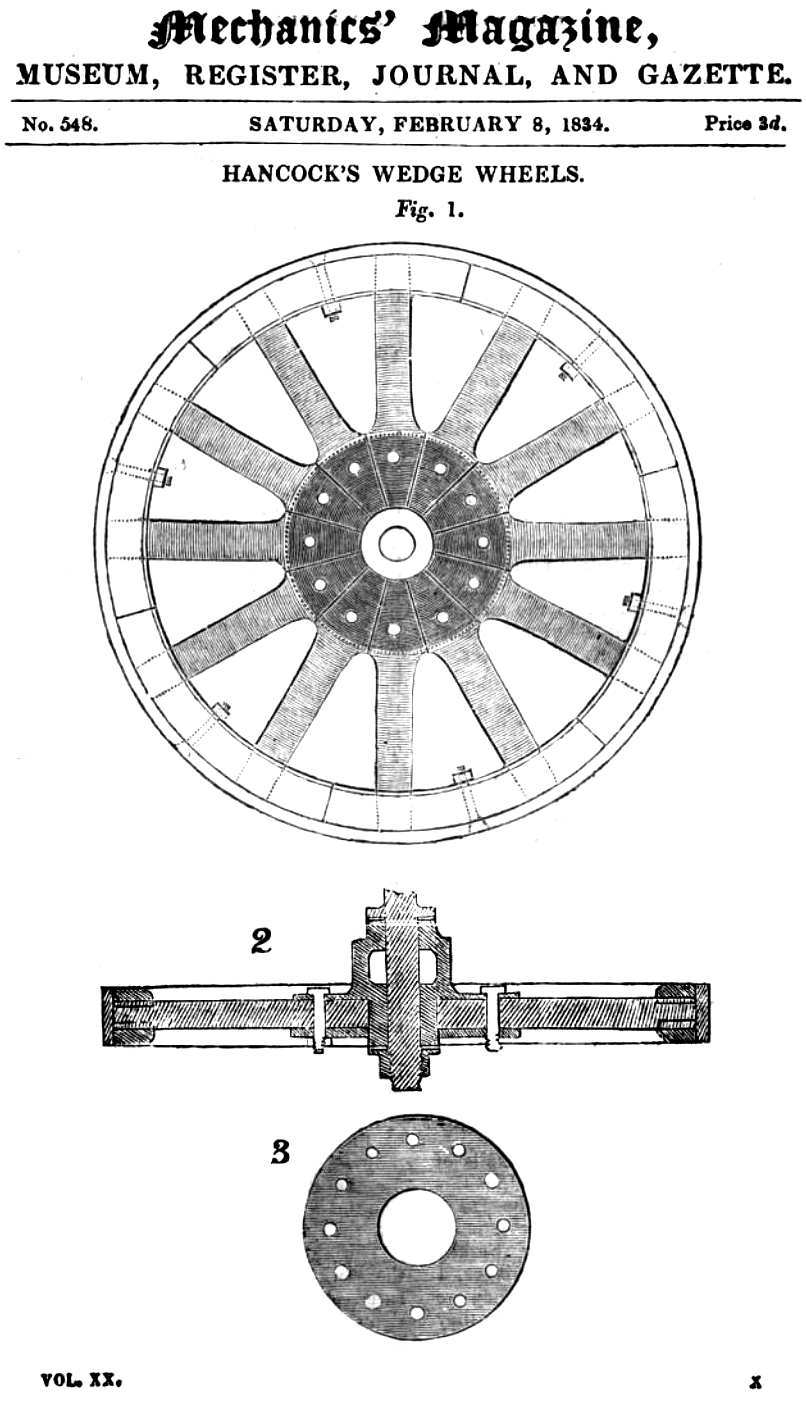
Walter Hancock's wedge wheel (artillery wheel) diagram, 1834

The artillery wheel was a nineteenth-century and early-twentieth-century style of wagon, gun carriage, and automobile wheel. Rather than having its spokes mortised into a wooden nave (hub), it has them fitted together in a keystone fashion with miter joints, bolted into a two-piece metal nave. Its tyre is shrunk onto the rim in the usual way, but it may also be bolted on for strength and security.

The design evolved over the nineteenth and early twentieth century, and was ultimately imitated in drawn steel for auto wheels, which sometimes show little immediate resemblance to most of their design ancestry.

== Wood artillery wheels ==
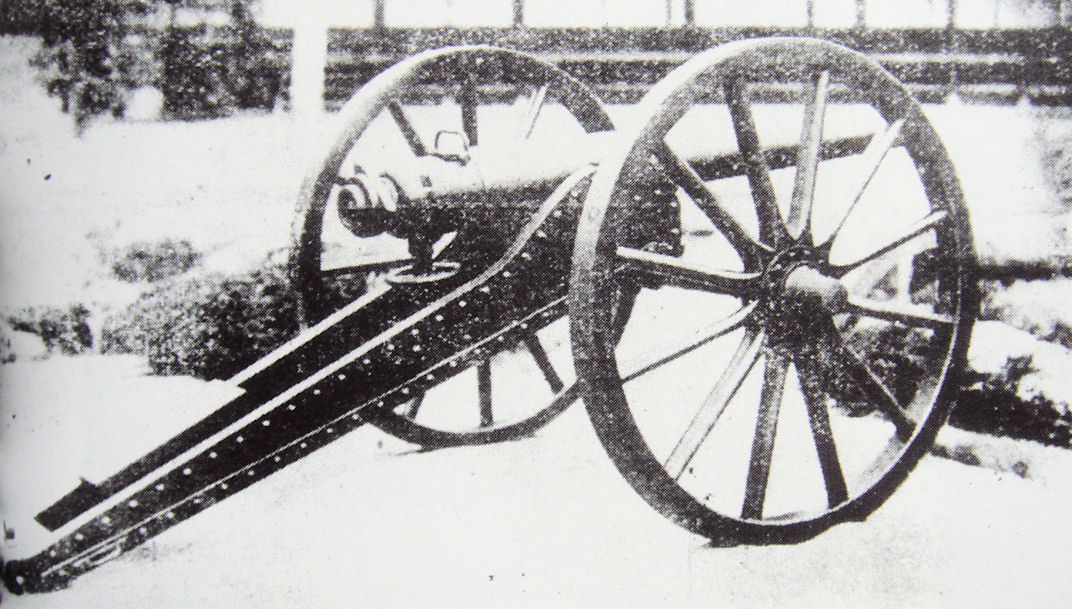
Armstrong gun with artillery wheels

Wheels with wood spokes fitted together in a keystone fashion with miter joints, bolted into a two-piece metal nave, were called "wedge wheels" by Walter Hancock who described them in 1834, as he used them on his steam-powered road vehicles. Unlike wheels on horse-drawn vehicles, the driven wheels on steam-powered vehicles had to transmit torque from the axle to the rim, imposing stresses at the nave, which was weakened by the mortises for the spokes.

In response to Hancock's description, John Robison said he had wheels of the same description built in 1811 for artillery carriages, and that "A construction very analogous to this has long been in use in the Madras Artillery; in which service I have always understood that it gave every satisfaction."

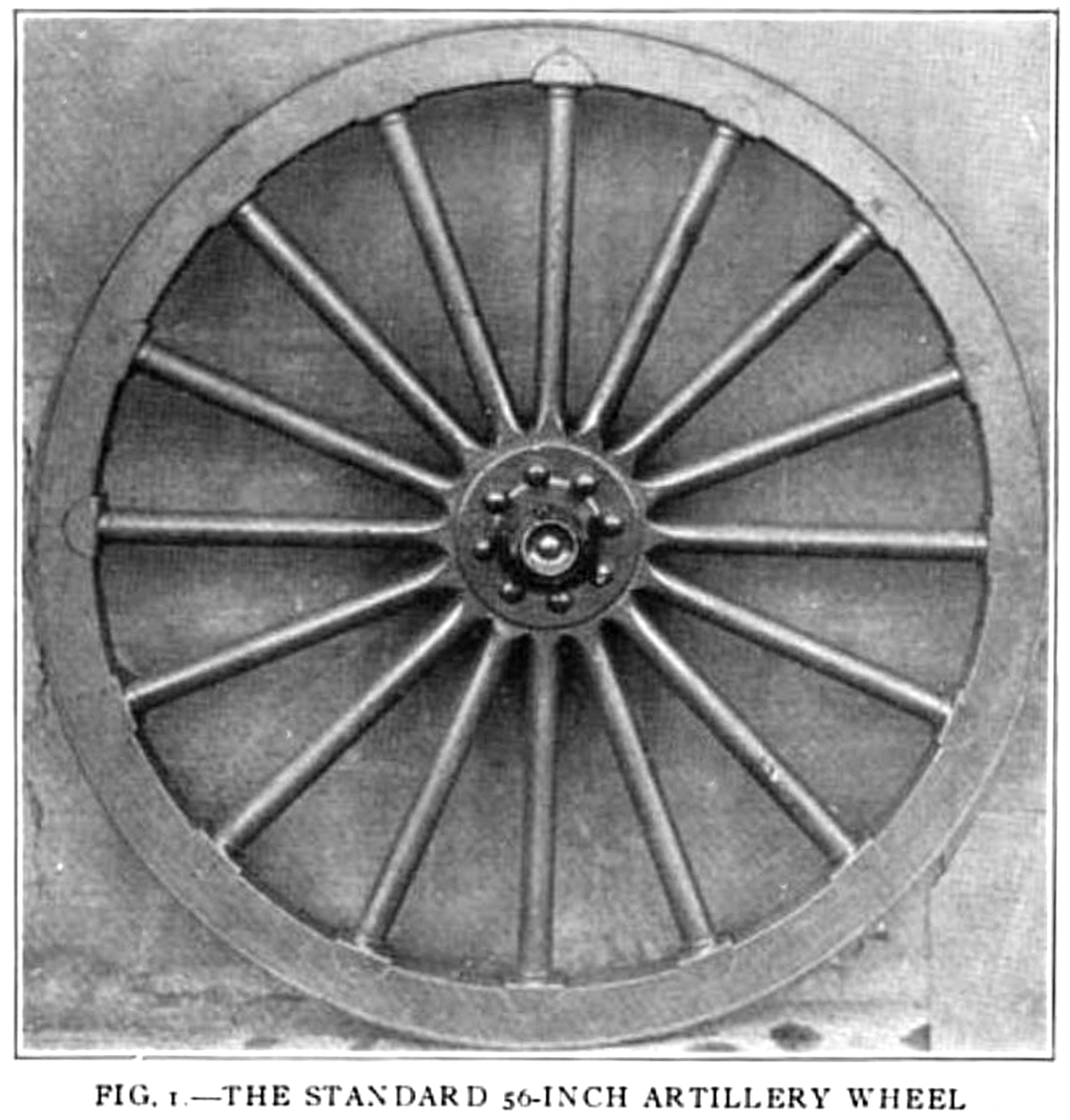
The 1917 standard 209-pound 56-inch artillery wheel of the US Army, for horse-drawn guns.

This wheel design that came to be called artillery wheels was extensively used with artillery. For example, this type of wheel was used on the pictured Armstrong gun, used in Japan in 1868. A similar design was used for a gun carriage for the US Army's 3.2-inch gun in 1881, with a wheel diameter of 57 inches (1,448 mm), based on testing of an Archibald Wheel Company design. By 1917, the 14-spoke wheel evolved to have 16 spokes, 0.5 inches (12.7 mm) high-carbon-steel tires, 2.875 inches (73.0 mm), felloes (8 sawed or 2 bent), improved spoke shoes, and 0.25 inches per foot (21 millimeters per meter) dishing, to arrive at the "standard" wheel pictured.

For motor-drawn guns, the wheel further evolved, primarily to smaller diameters to accommodate solid rubber tires.

== Motor vehicles ==
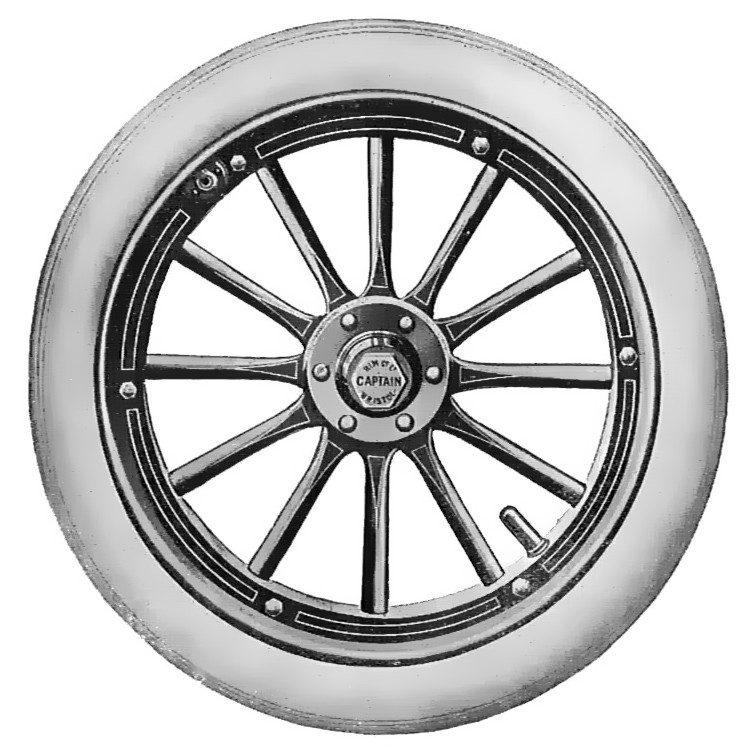
Artillery wheel for a motorcar

Wood-spoke artillery wheels were used on early automobiles, as a stronger alternative to wire wheels. By the 1920s, many motor cars used wheels that looked at a glance like wooden artillery wheels, but which were of cast steel or welded from steel pressed sections. These too were usually called artillery wheels. Whether wood, pressed steel, or wire wheels were preferred varied greatly in different markets.

=== British cars ===
Joseph Sankey and Sons developed and patented the first pressed-steel and welded detachable motor car wheel. Production started in 1908, with customers including Herbert Austin and, later, William Morris. By 1920, Sankey were supplying wheels to many UK manufacturers.

Though Sankey did not market their steel wheels as artillery wheels, the term Sankey wheels was used interchangeably with steel artillery wheels by 1930. Sankey belatedly, circa 1935, publicly recognized the connection of their steel wheels to artillery wheels.

=== US cars ===
In the 1930s, US manufacturers, whose markets often preferred wheels of substantial appearance, moved to stamped steel wheels which imitated large-hub artillery wheels. Ford Motor Company adopted this in 1935, Chevrolet brought out its now iconic wheel in 1936. These wheels were based on large-hub wheels, and do not superficially resemble most small-hub wood wheels.

== Gallery ==
Artillery wheels

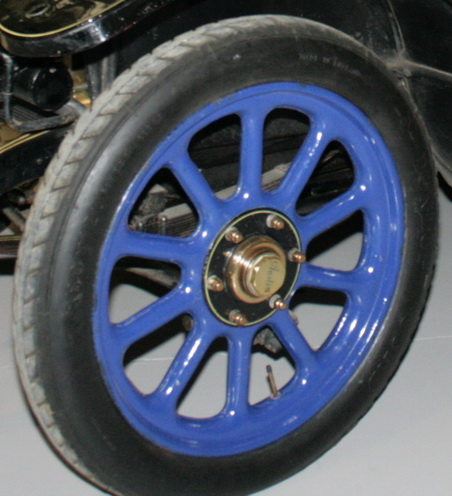
1908 aftermarket pressed and welded detachable steel wheel on a 1907 Austin

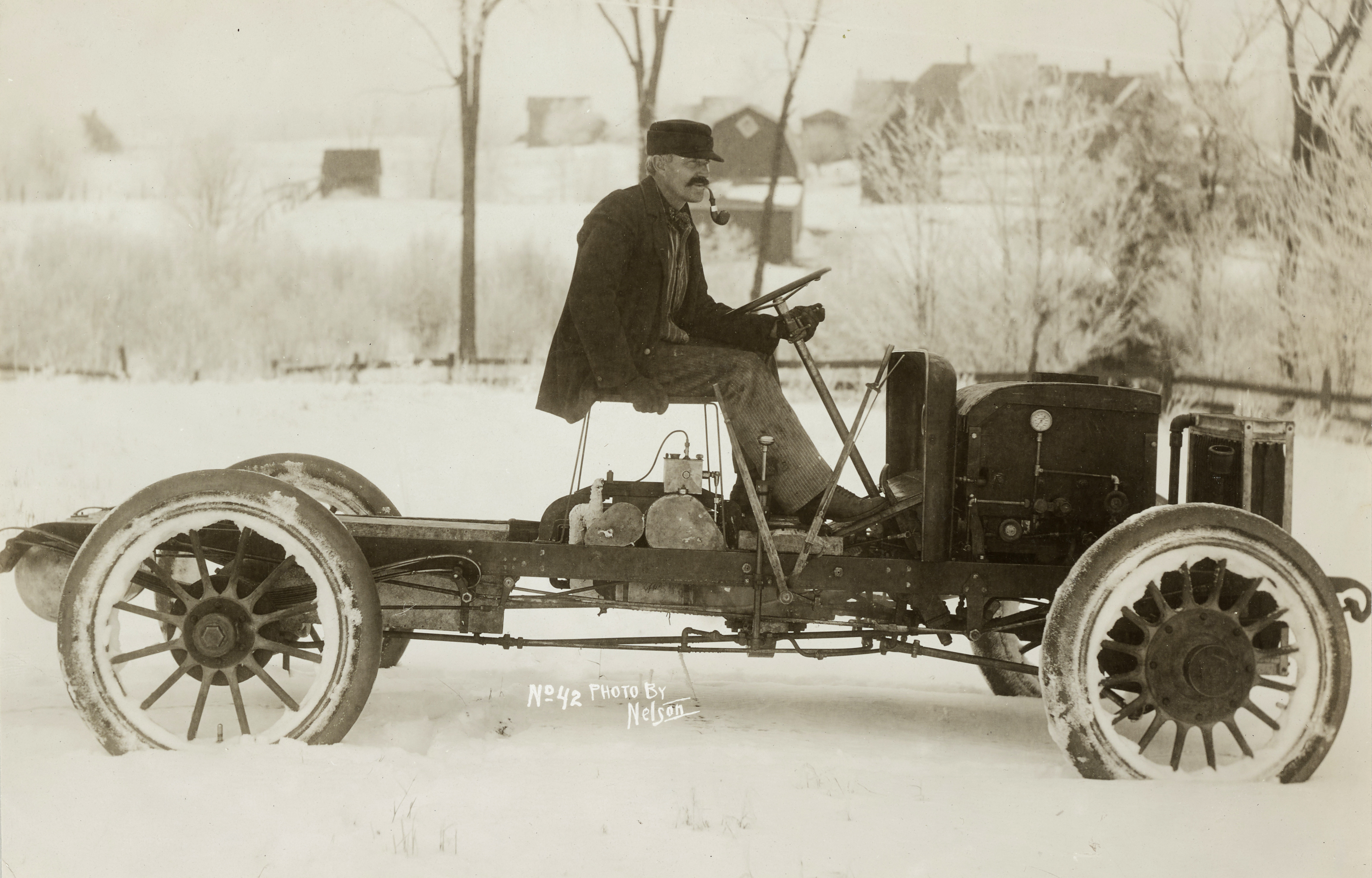
4WD steam car with artillery wheels, c. 1918

A 1926 Humber with steel artillery wheels

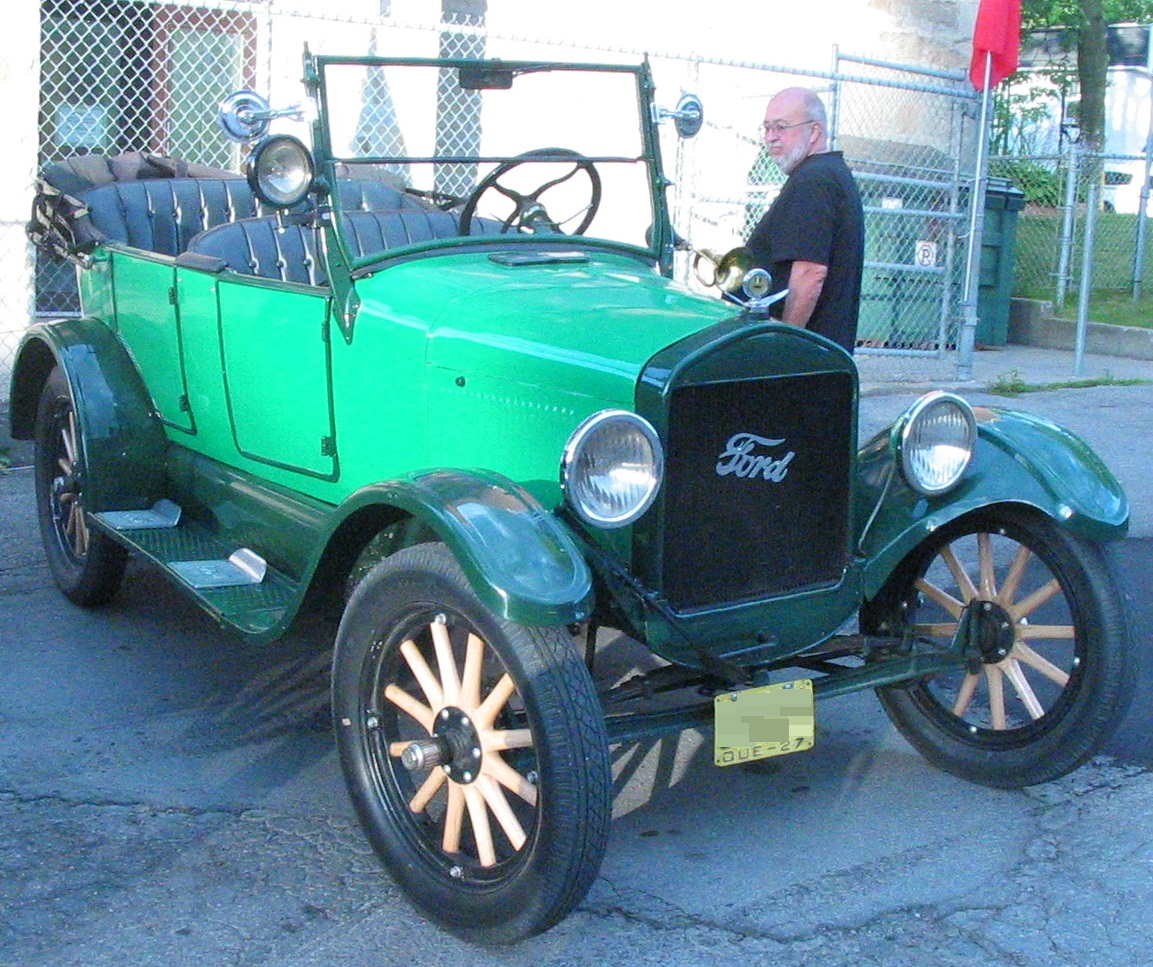
A 1927 Ford T with wood artillery wheels}

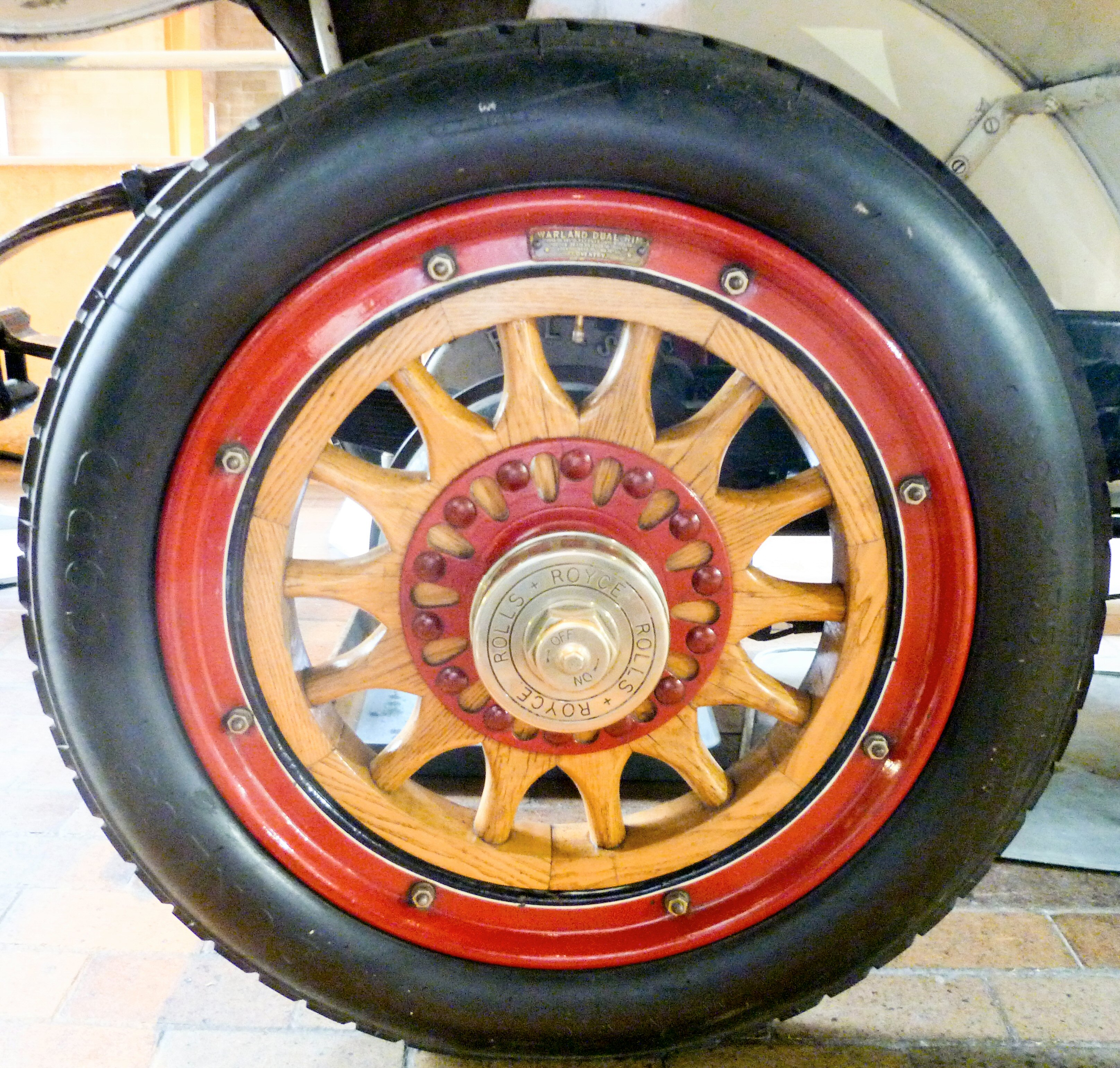
Later steel artillery wheels were often based on large-hub wood designs like this

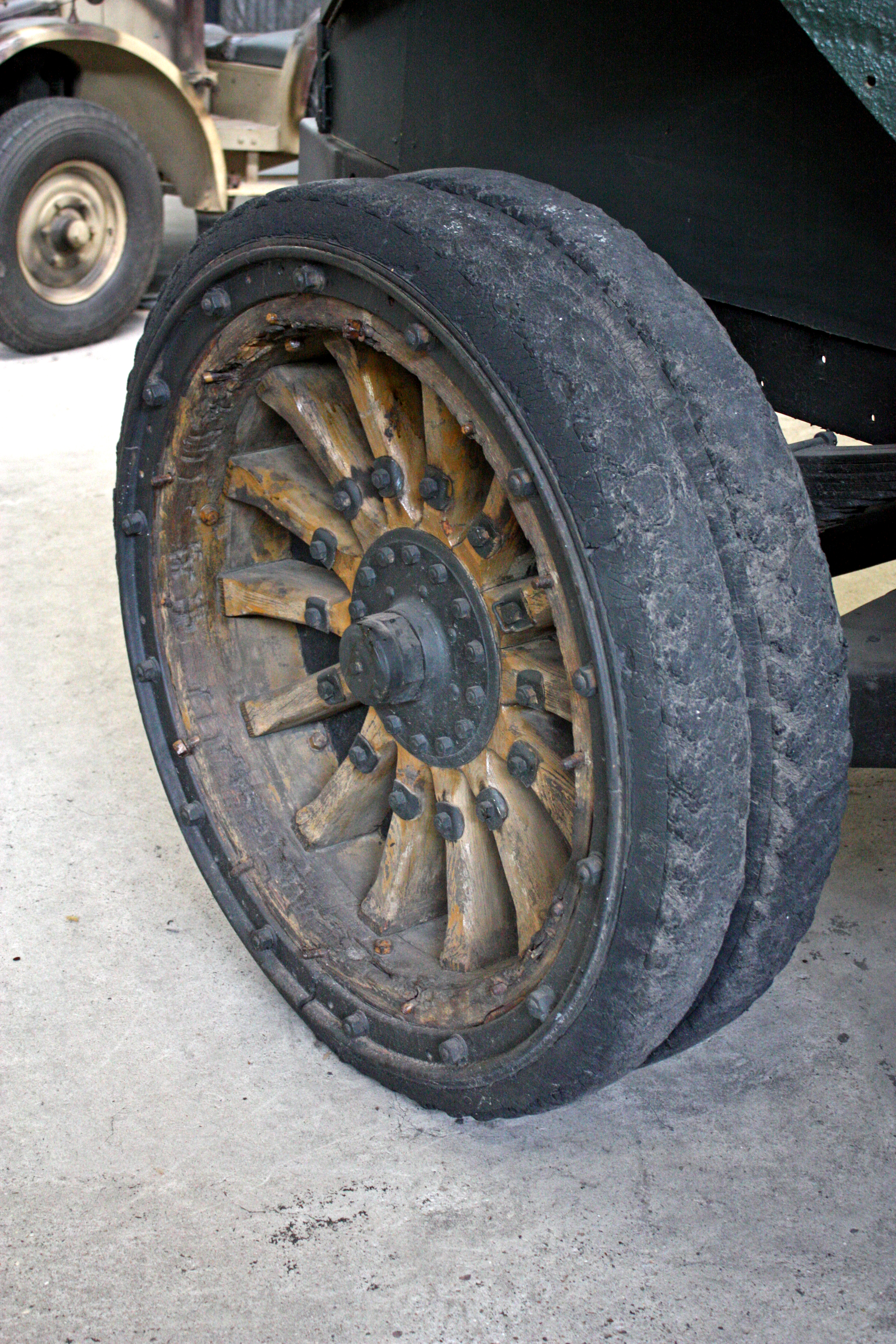
double solid tire wheel

== See also ==
- Cart wheel
