= Rolls-Royce Phantom I =

Ultra-luxury flagship automobile in its first generation

Rolls-Royce New Phantom
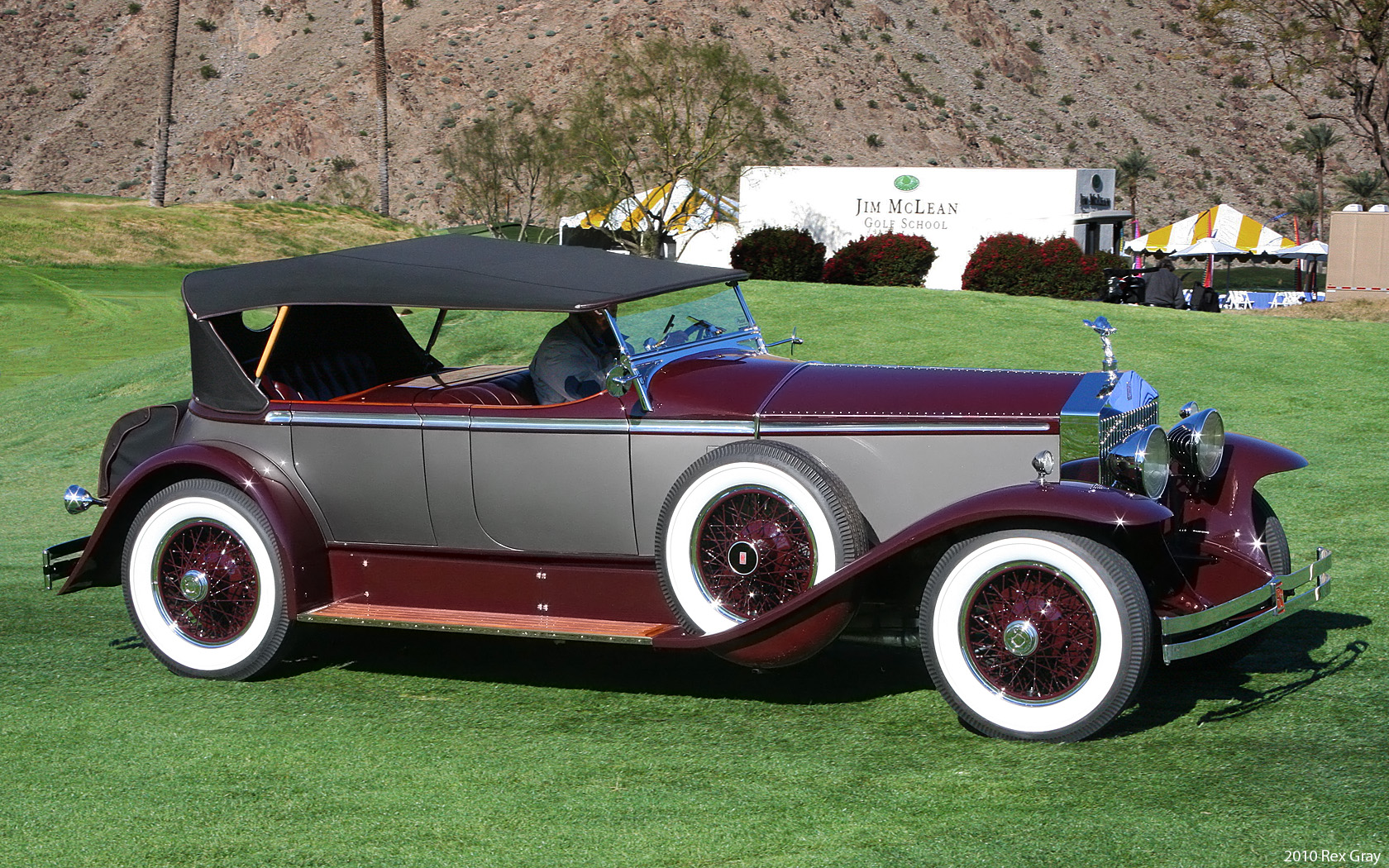
- 1929 Rolls Royce Phantom Ascot Tourer

Overview
- Manufacturer: Rolls-Royce Ltd (UK); Rolls-Royce of America (US)
- Also called: 40/50 Phantom; Phantom I
- Production: 1925–1931; 3,512 produced: 2,269 at Derby; 1,243 at Springfield
- Assembly: United Kingdom: Derby, England; United States: Springfield, Massachusetts

Body and chassis
- Class: Luxury car
- Body style: 4-door saloon
- Layout: FR layout

Powertrain
- Engine: 7,668 cc (468 cu in) I6
- Transmission: 3-speed manual 4-speed manual

Dimensions
- Wheelbase: 143 1/2 in (3,645 mm); US LWB: 146 1/2 in (3,721 mm); UK LWB: 150 1/2 in (3,823 mm)

Chronology
- Predecessor: Silver Ghost
- Successor: Phantom II

The Rolls-Royce Phantom was Rolls-Royce's replacement for the original Silver Ghost. Introduced as the New Phantom in 1925, the Phantom had a larger engine than the Silver Ghost and used pushrod-operated overhead valves instead of the Silver Ghost's side valves.

The Phantom was built in Derby, England, and Springfield, Massachusetts, in the United States. There were several differences in specification between the English and American Phantoms.

The Phantom was replaced by the Phantom II in 1929. The designation Phantom I was never used by Rolls-Royce; it is a construct of enthusiasts applied to help distinguish it from other generations with the same model name.

== Description ==
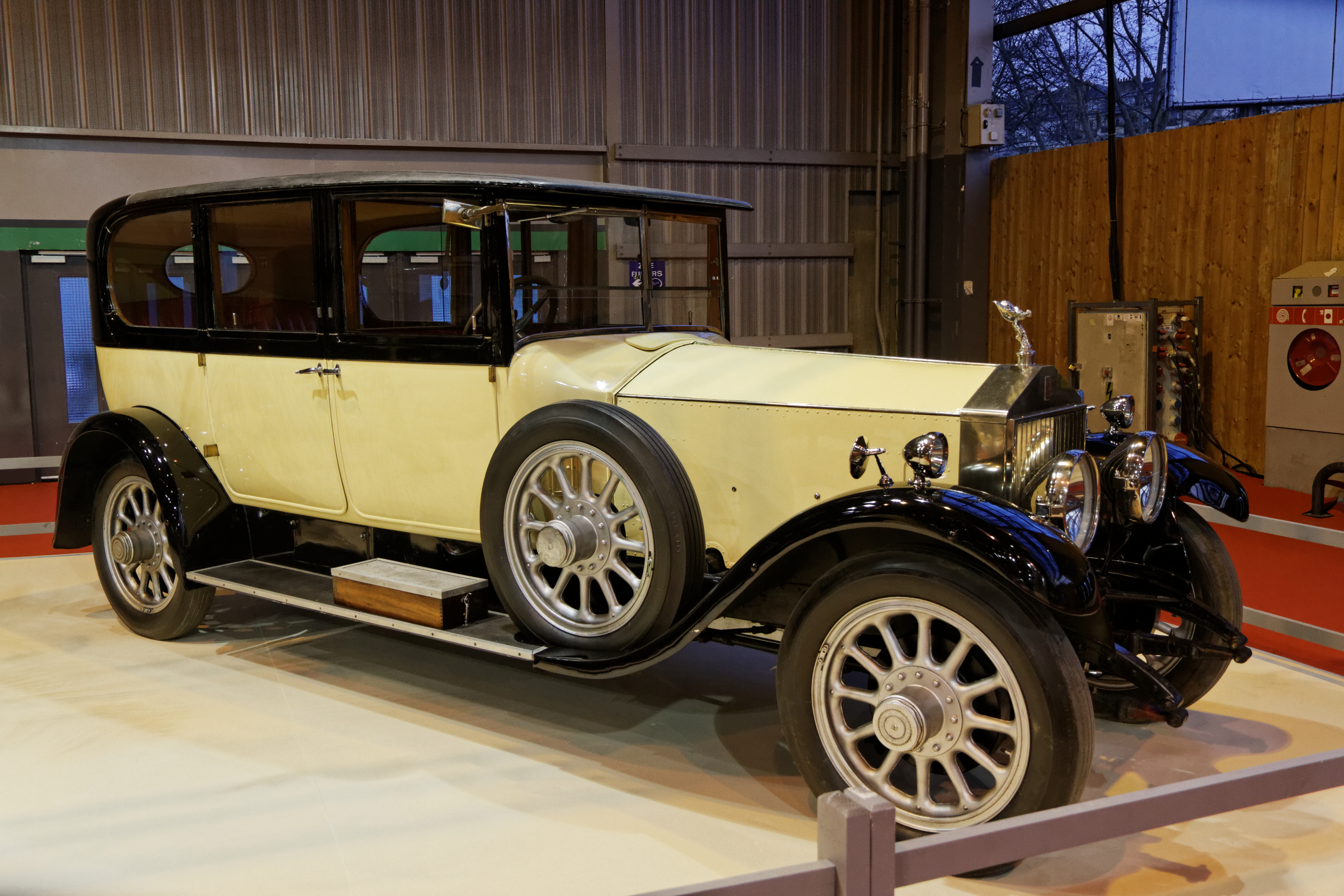
1926 Phantom limousine

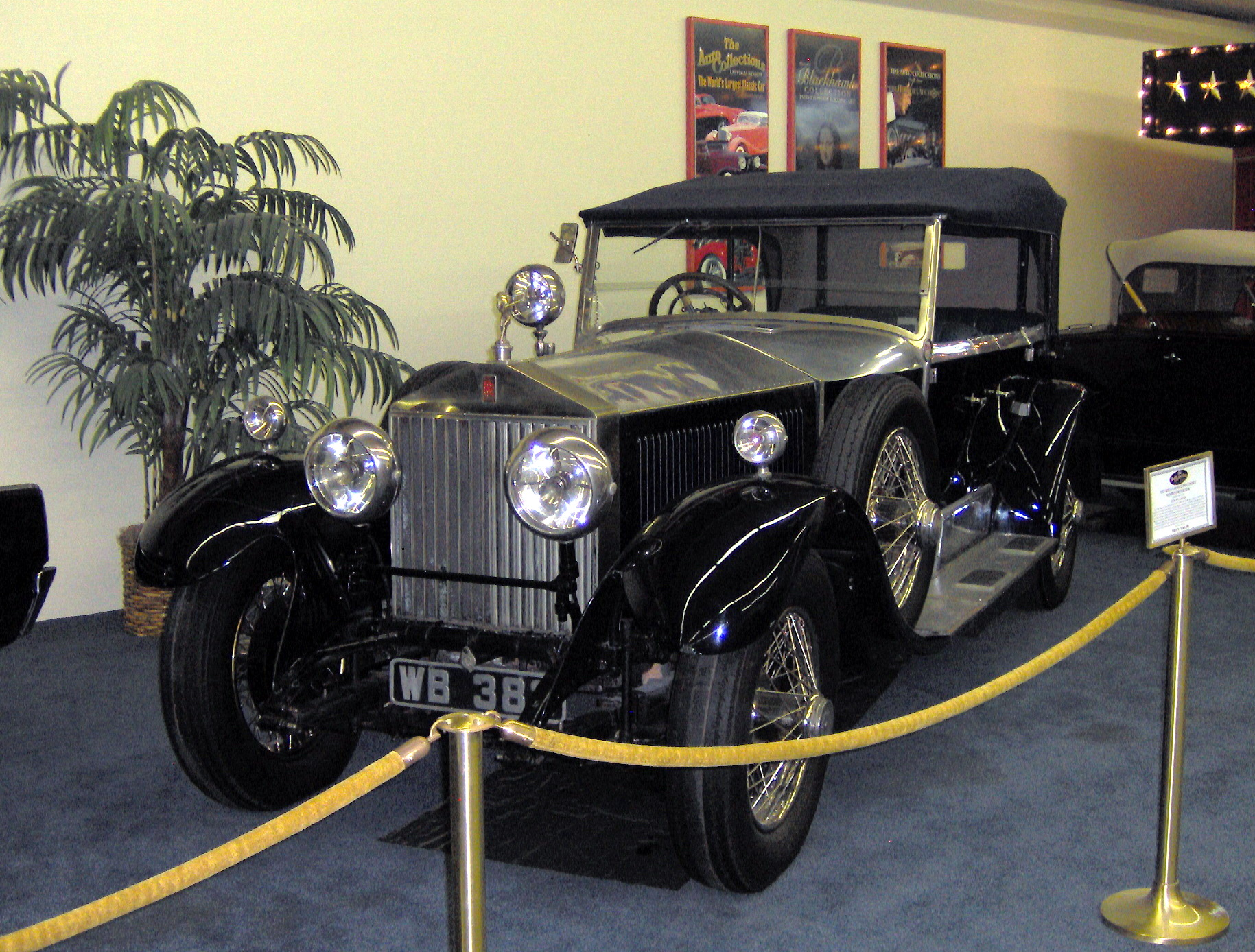
Derby New Phantom tourer by Windovers 1927

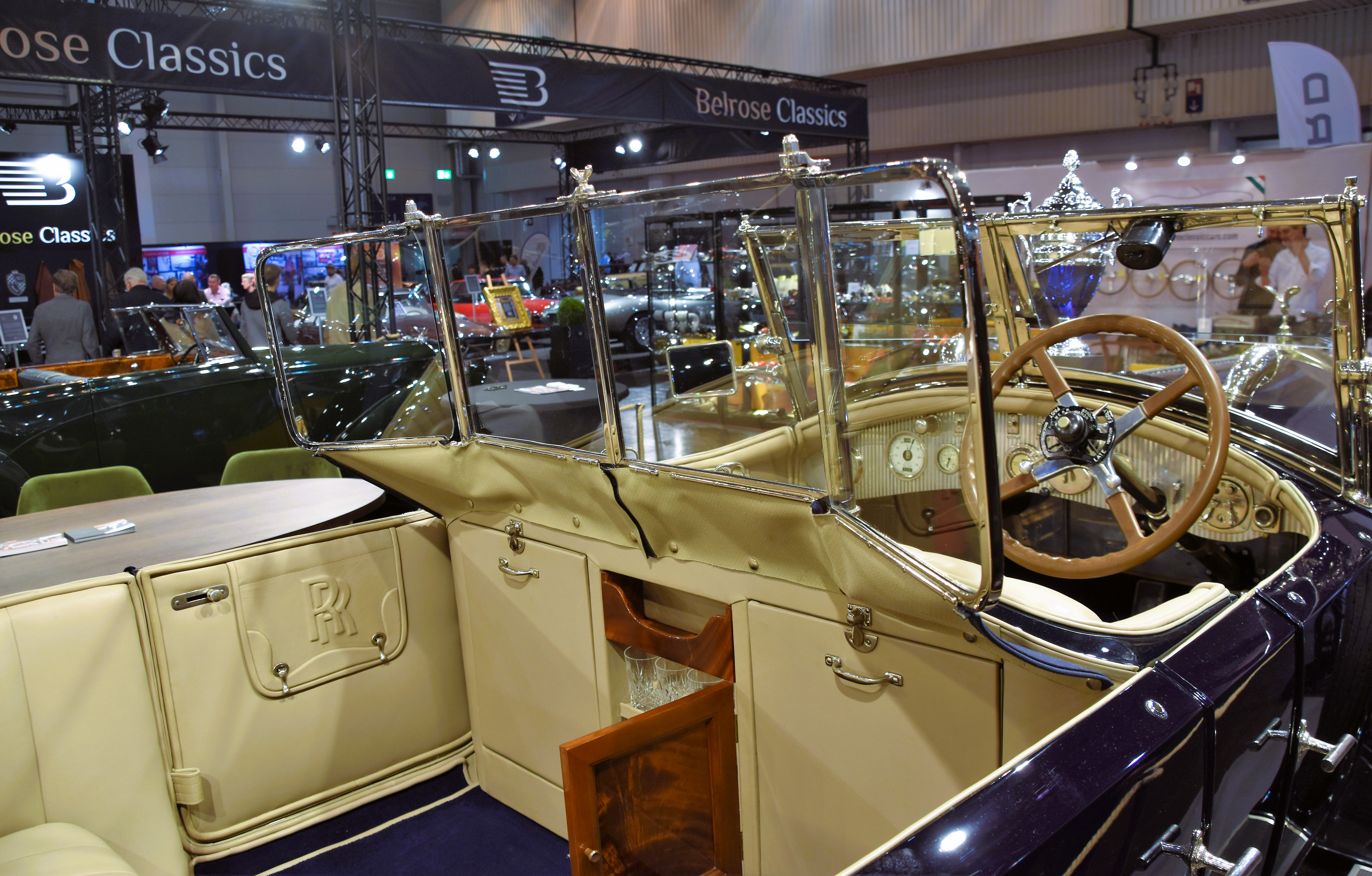
1926 Phantom Tourer by Hooper interior

=== Name ===
Introduced in 1925, the New Phantom was Rolls-Royce's second 40/50 hp model. To differentiate between the 40/50 hp models, Rolls-Royce named the new model "New Phantom" and renamed the old model "Silver Ghost", which was the name given to their demonstration example, Registration No. AX201. The name Phantom was a nod to the previous "Silver Ghost", remarking on the vehicles "extraordinary stealth" and quietness in comparison to other vehicles offered at the time. When the New Phantom was replaced by another 40/50 hp model in 1929, the replacement was named Phantom II and the New Phantom was commonly referred to as Phantom I to this day. While Rolls-Royce themselves did not use the term "Phantom I" until their recent acquisition by BMW Group, New Phantoms were referred to as such in period and are commonly called Phantom I by enthusiasts, concours events, and owner's clubs.

=== Drivetrain ===
One major improvement over the Silver Ghost was the new pushrod-OHV straight-6 engine. Constructed as two groups of three cylinders with a single detachable head, the engine was described by Rolls-Royce as producing "sufficient" power. The engine used a 4 1/4 in (108.0 mm) bore and undersquare 5 1/2 in (139.7 mm) stroke for a total of 7.7 L (7,668 cc (467.9 cu in)) of displacement. In 1928, the cylinder heads were upgraded from cast iron to aluminium; this caused corrosion problems. The separate gearbox connected through a rubberised fabric flexible coupling to the clutch and through a torque tube enclosed drive to the differential at rear, as in the Silver Ghost.

=== Chassis ===
The New Phantom used the same frame as the Silver Ghost, with semi-elliptical springs suspending the front axle and cantilever springs suspending the rear axle. Four-wheel brakes with a servo-assistance system licensed from Hispano-Suiza were also specified, though some early US models lacked front brakes.

The Rolls-Royce P-1 automobile utilized a Prony Brake mechanism to boost insufficient mechanical wheel brakes. A metallic drum is installed at the output of the transmission with a friction band which is tightened by force from the brake pedal. This imparts a force into brake linkages, increasing braking effort for the massively heavy vehicle. Available boost force increases with vehicle speed. At rest, a small amount of braking force is still available in the pedal PLUS the large hand brake.

=== Differences between US and UK versions ===
Like the Silver Ghost, the New Phantom was constructed both at Rolls-Royce's Derby factory in the United Kingdom and at a factory in Springfield, Massachusetts in the United States. The US factory produced New Phantoms from 1926 to 1931.

Principal differences between the US and UK models included wheelbases and transmissions. Both versions were specified with the same standard 143 1/2 in (3,645 mm) wheelbase; the long-wheelbase U.S. model was 146 1/2 in (3,721 mm) and the UK 150 1/2 in (3,823 mm). Both versions used a single dry-plate clutch, with US models equipped with a centre change 3-speed transmission and UK a 4-speed.

Other minor differences include fuel gauge placement, with the UK New Phantom's at the tank but some US models having one on the dash, and manual central lubrication systems. The UK Phantom employed Enots nipples, some times as many as 50, which required attachment of a special Enots oil pressure gun and needed time-consuming service at 500, 1000 and 2000 mile intervals; the US model used a centralized Bijur system which lubricated all the oiling points with a stroke of a single pump.

== Coachwork ==
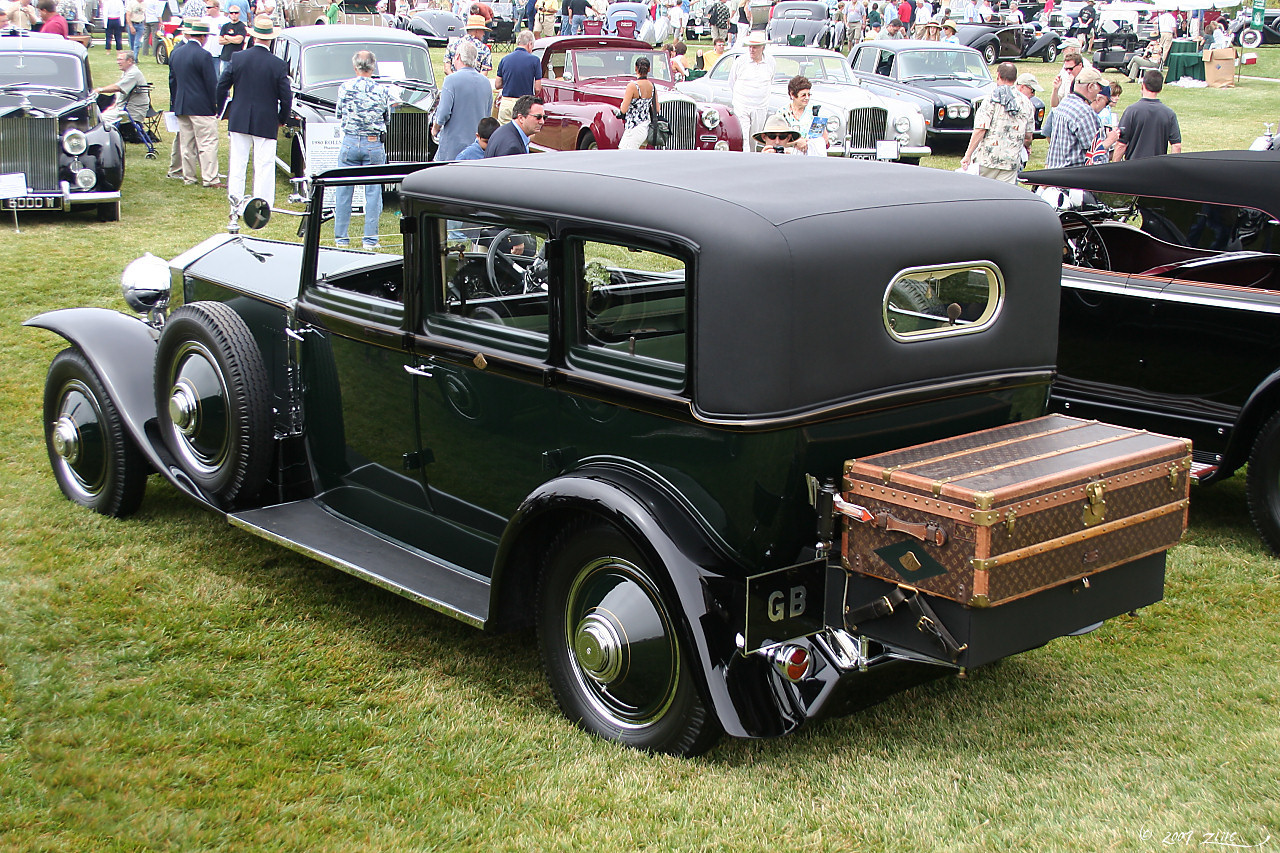
New Phantom sedanca de ville by Hooper 1929

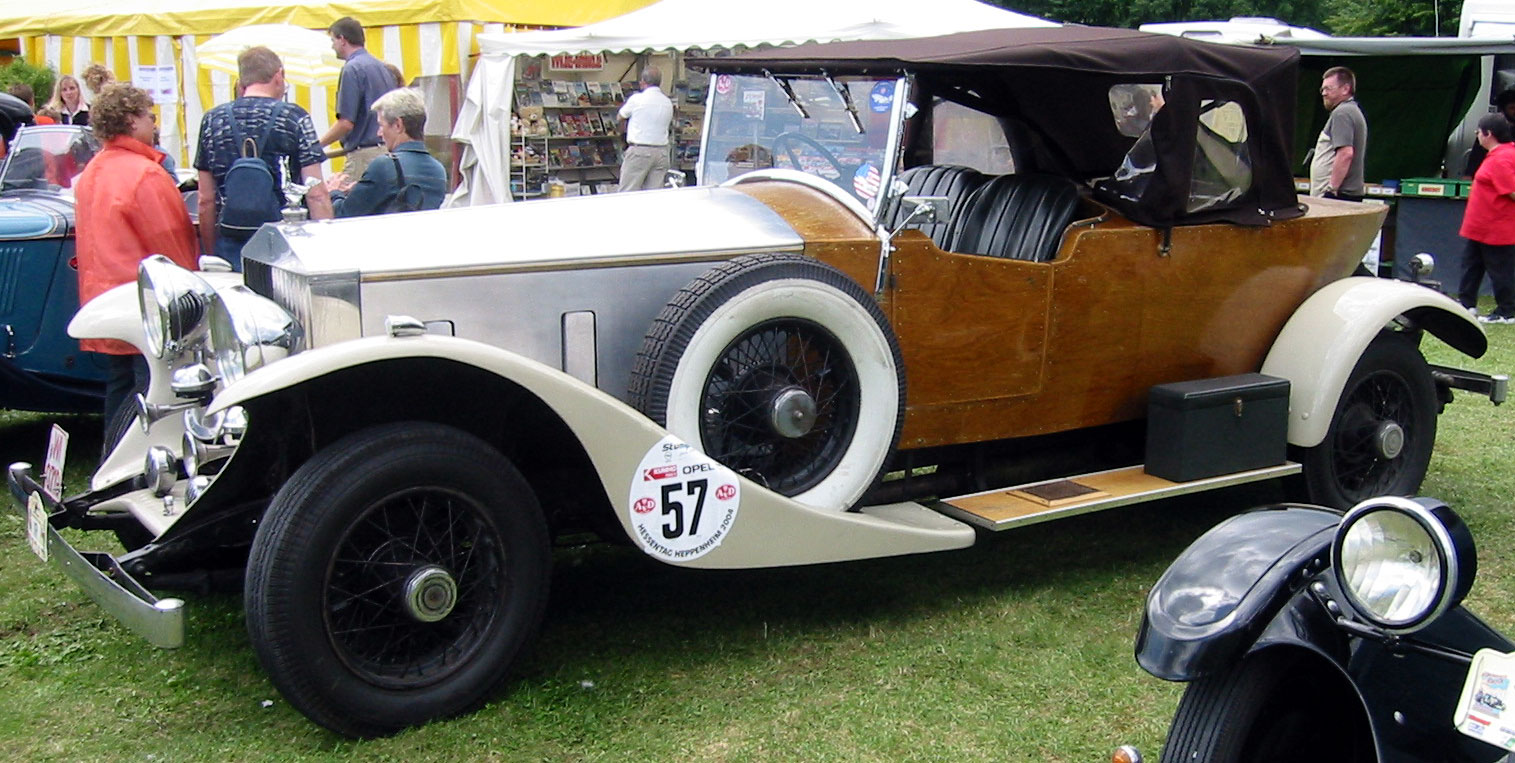
Wooden coachwork on a Phantom I

Only the chassis and mechanical parts were produced by Rolls-Royce. The body was made and fitted by a coachbuilder selected by the owner. British coachbuilders who produced bodies for New Phantoms included Barker, Park Ward, Windovers, Thrupp & Maberly, Mulliner, Hooper. Continental houses such as Saoutchik, Henry Binder and Kellner in Paris, Erdmann and Rossi in Berlin, Baltasar Fiol in Spain, Nordberg in Sweden and the Italian coachbuilder Zagato also produced coachwork for the New Phantom, just to name a few. Despite the availability of a US-built chassis, a handful of British-made Phantoms were outfitted with American coachwork.

American Phantoms could be bought with standardized bodies from Brewster & Co., which was owned by Rolls-Royce after 1926, and additional coachwork choices were available from Fleetwood. Several coachwork choices were listed, or just a rolling chassis could be provided for US$13,335 ($250,031 in 2025 dollars) A fendered chassis was also available, while coachwork choices were listed by different city names in England: These include the Derby Touring Sedan, Ascot Phaeton, York Roadster, Huntington Limousine, Henley Convertible, Avon Sedan, Newmarket Convertible Sedan, Chatsworth Town Car, and the French city of Trouville Town Car. A convertible sedan with coachwork from Hibbard & Darrin was also offered, as were other French-made bodies by the same coachbuilder. They were shipped to the United States and subsequently mounted on Springfield Phantom chassis.

== Production ==
- New Phantom (UK): 2,269
- New Phantom (US): 1,240
