= Rolls-Royce Silver Ghost =

Luxury car produced from 1906 to 1926

Rolls-Royce 40/50 Silver Ghost
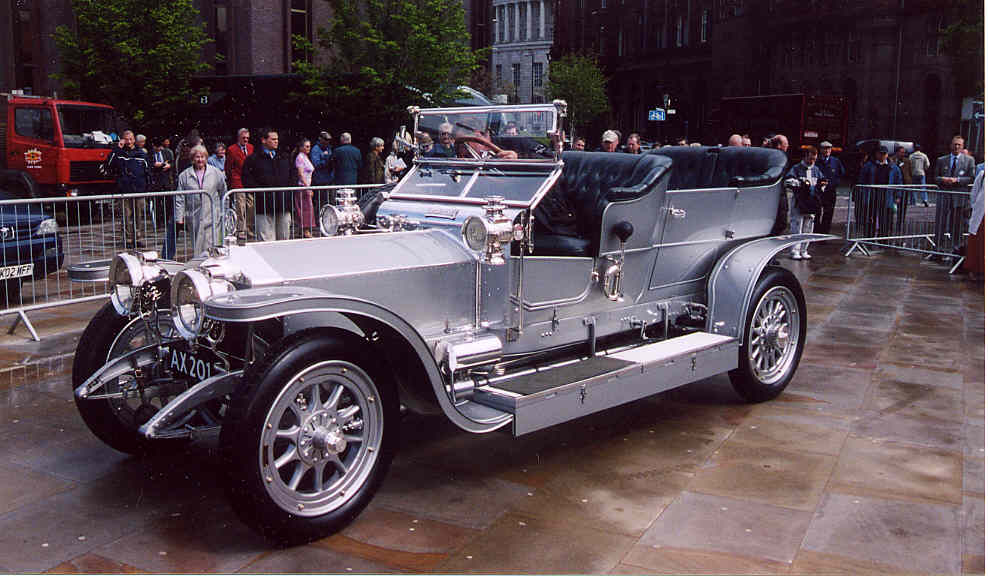
- AX201, Roi-des-Belges tourer by Barker

Overview
- Manufacturer: Rolls-Royce Ltd (UK); Rolls-Royce of America (US)
- Also called: 40/50
- Production: 1906–1926; 7,874 made
- Assembly: United Kingdom: Derby, England; United States: Springfield, Massachusetts

Body and chassis
- Class: Luxury car
- Related: Rolls-Royce armoured car

Powertrain
- Engine: Inline 6; 7036cc (429.4cid) (1906–1910); 7428cc (453.3cid) (from 1910)
- Transmission: 3-speed manual (1909–1913); 4-speed manual (from 1913)

Dimensions
- Wheelbase: 135.5 in (3,442 mm) (1906–1913); 143.5 in (3,645 mm) (1913–1923); 144 in (3,658 mm) and 150.5 in (3,823 mm) (from 1923)

Chronology
- Predecessor: Rolls-Royce 30 hp
- Successor: Phantom I

Claude Johnson at the wheel of AX201, the original "Silver Ghost", 1907

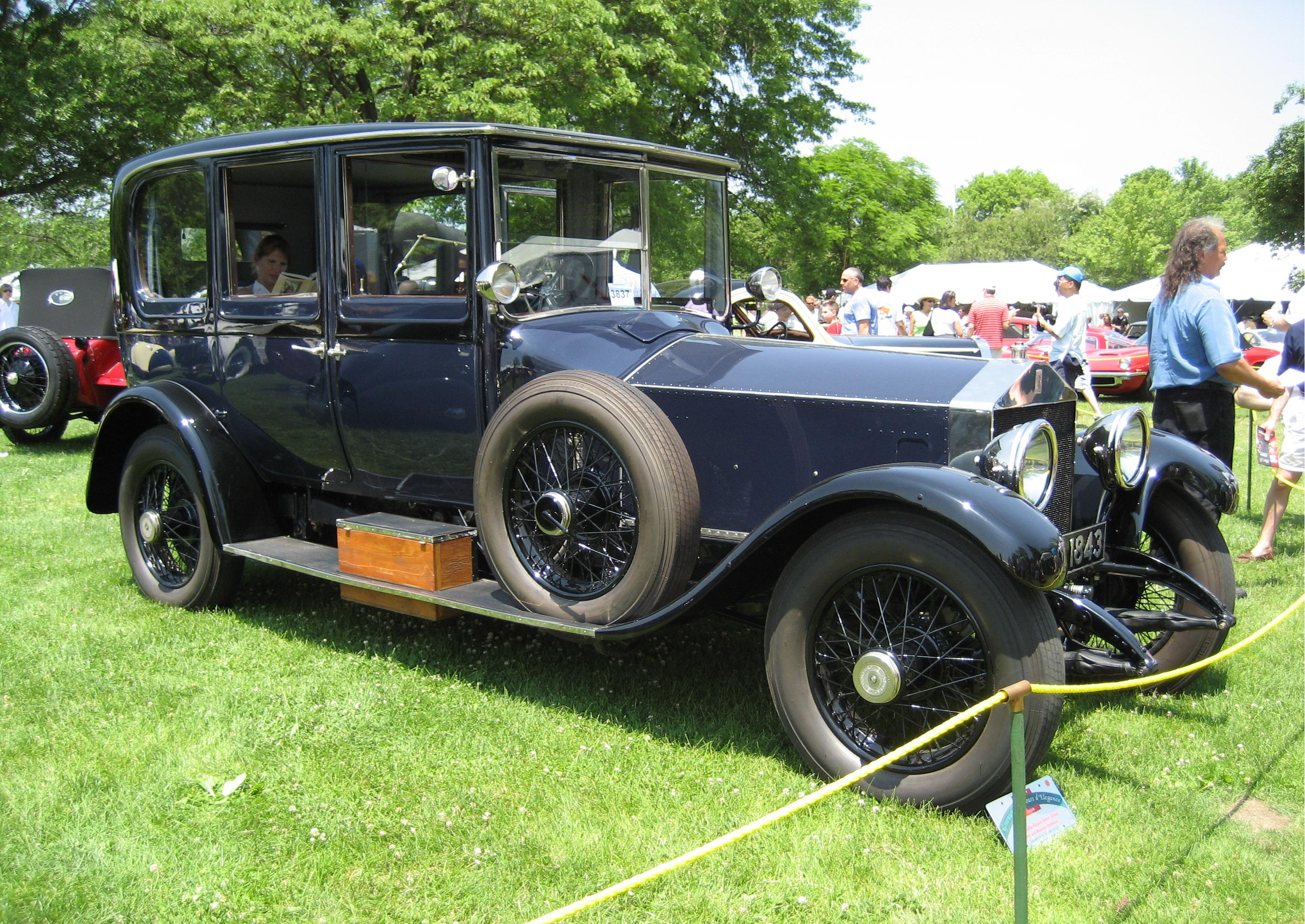
1920 Silver Ghost with limousine coachwork

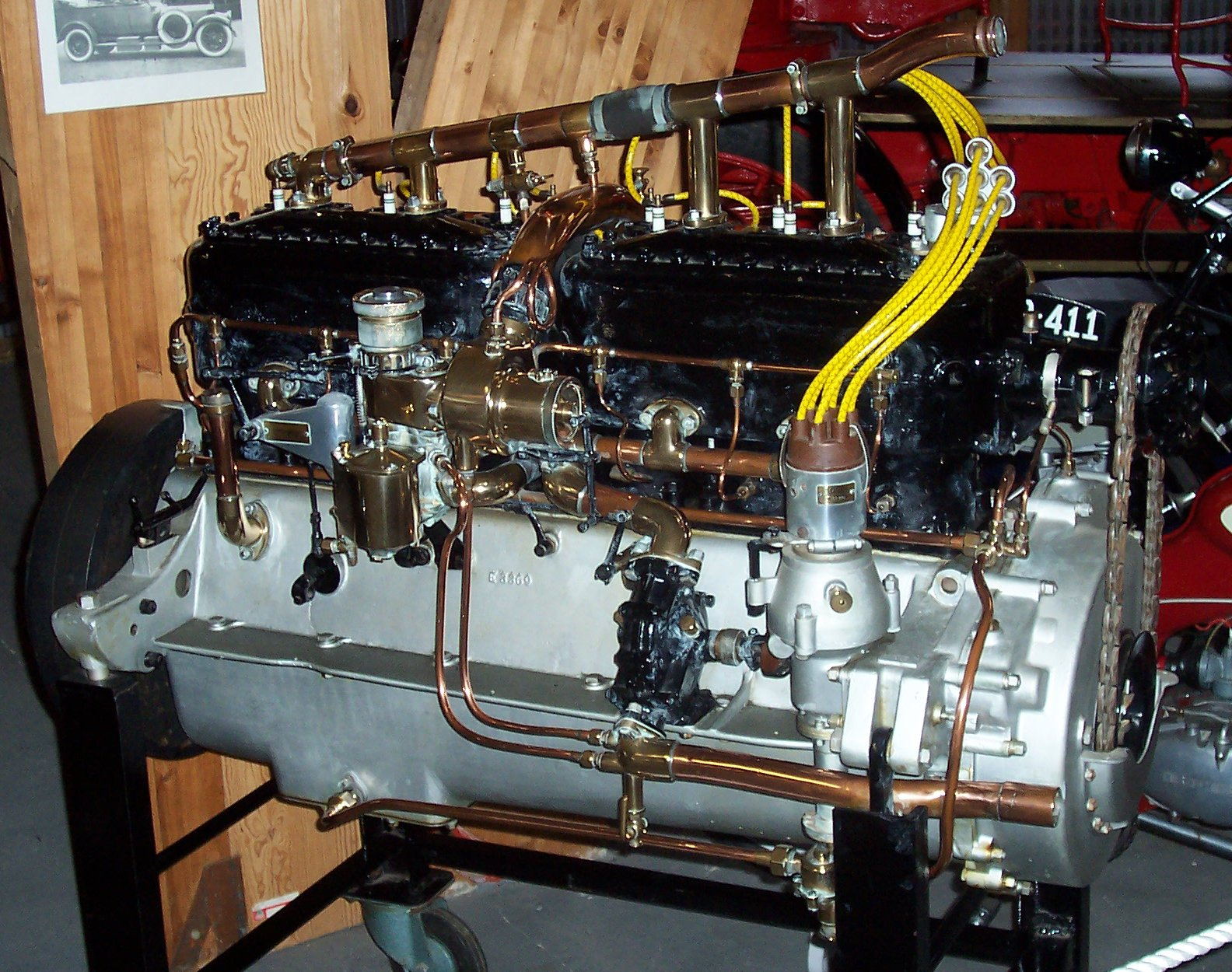
40/50 hp Silver Ghost 7,428cc side-valve six-cylinder engine.

The Rolls-Royce Silver Ghost name refers both to a car model and one specific car from that series. Originally named the "40/50 h.p." the chassis was first made at Royce's Manchester works, with production moving to Derby in July 1908, and also, between 1921 and 1926, in Springfield, Massachusetts, USA. Chassis no. 60551, registered AX 201, was the car that was originally given the name "Silver Ghost". Other 40/50 hp cars were also given names, but the Silver Ghost title was taken up by the press, and soon all 40/50s were called by the name, a fact not officially recognised by Rolls-Royce until 1925, when the Phantom range was launched.

The Silver Ghost was the origin of Rolls-Royce's claim of making the "best car in the world" – a phrase coined not by themselves, but by the prestigious publication Autocar in 1907. The chassis and engine were also used as the basis of a range of Rolls-Royce Armoured Cars. In December 1923, four friends of Woodrow Wilson chipped in to buy the former president a Silver Ghost, just weeks before Wilson's death in February 1924. The car was modified so that Wilson, who was disabled, could enter and exit the car more easily.

== History ==
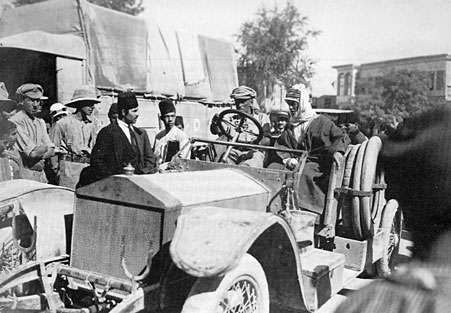
T. E. Lawrence in Blue Mist, 1918

In 1906, Rolls-Royce produced four chassis to be shown at the Olympia car show, two existing models, a four-cylinder 20 hp and a six-cylinder 30 hp, and two examples of a new car designated the 40/50 hp. The 40/50 hp was so new that the show cars were not fully finished, and examples were not provided to the press for testing until March 1907.

The car at first had a new side-valve, six-cylinder, 7036 cc engine (7428 cc from 1910) with the cylinders cast in two units of three cylinders each as opposed to the triple two-cylinder units on the earlier six. A three-speed transmission was fitted at first with four-speed units used from 1913. The seven-bearing crankshaft had full pressure lubrication, and the centre main bearing was made especially large to remove vibration, essentially splitting the engine into two three-cylinder units. Two spark plugs were fitted to each cylinder with, from 1921, a choice of magneto or coil ignition. The earliest cars had used a trembler coil to produce the spark with a magneto as an optional extra which soon became standard – the instruction was to start the engine on the trembler/battery and then switch to magneto. Continuous development allowed power output to be increased from 48 bhp (36 kW) at 1,250 rpm to 80 bhp (60 kW) at 2,250 rpm. Electric lighting became an option in 1914 and was standardised in 1919. Electric starting was fitted from 1919 along with electric lights to replace the older ones that used acetylene or oil.

Development of the Silver Ghost was suspended during World War I, although the chassis and engine were supplied for use in Rolls-Royce Armoured Cars. A blue 1909 Silver Ghost known as Blue Mist, previously owned by an Irish lord, was used by Lawrence of Arabia as his personal staff car during the Arab Revolt. Construction of a replica Blue Mist began in 2018.

The chassis had rigid front and rear axles and leaf springs all round. Early cars only had brakes on the rear wheels operated by a hand lever, with a pedal-operated transmission brake acting on the propeller shaft. The footbrake system moved to drums on the rear axle in 1913. Four-wheel servo-assisted brakes became optional in 1923.

Despite these improvements the performance of the Silver Ghost's competitors had improved to the extent that its previous superiority had been eroded by the early 1920s. Sales declined from 742 in 1913 to 430 in 1922. The company decided to launch its replacement which was introduced in 1925 as the New Phantom. After this, older 40/50 models were called Silver Ghosts to avoid confusion.

A total of 7874 Silver Ghost cars were produced from 1907 to 1926, including 1701 from the American Springfield factory. The documented chassis price listed for the 1921 American version was US$11,750 ($212,092 in 2025 dollars). Many of them still run today. A fine example is on display at the National Motor Museum, Beaulieu.

== The Alpine Eagles ==
A 40/50 was privately entered in the prestigious 1912 Austrian Alpine Trial by James Radley, but its 3-speed gearbox proved inadequate for the ascent of the Katschberg Pass. A factory team of four cars were prepared for the 1913 event with four-speed gearboxes, and engine power increased from 60 bhp (45 kW) to 75 bhp (56 kW) by an increase in compression ratio and larger carburettor. The team gained six awards including the Archduke Leopold Cup. Replicas of the victorious cars were put into production and sold officially as Continental models, but they were called Alpine Eagles by chief test driver (and later Rolls-Royce Managing Director) Ernest Hives, and this is the name that they have kept.

== The Silver Ghost ==
In 1907 Claude Johnson, commercial and managing director of Rolls-Royce, ordered a car to be used as a demonstrator by the company. With chassis no. 60551 and registered AX 201, it was the 12th 40/50 hp to be made, and was painted in aluminium paint with silver-plated fittings. The car was named the "Silver Ghost" to emphasise its ghost-like quietness, and a plaque bearing this name adorned the bulkhead. An open-top Roi-des-Belges body by coachbuilder Barker was fitted, and the car readied for the Scottish reliability trials of 1907 and, immediately afterwards, another 15,000-mile (24,000 km) test which included driving between London and Glasgow 27 times.

The aim was to raise public awareness of the new company and to show the reliability and quietness of their new car. This was a risky idea: cars of this time were notoriously unreliable, and roads of the day could be horrendous. Nevertheless, the car set off on trials, and with press aboard, broke various records. Even after 7,000 miles (11,000 km), the cost to service the car was a negligible £2 2s 7d (£2.13). The reputation of the 40/50, and Rolls-Royce, was established.

The "AX 201" was sold in 1908, for £750, to Sir Daniel Hanbury who used it repeatedly to travel to his Italian residence, Villa della Pergola in Alassio, in the Italian Riviera, starting from his English residence Castle Malwood in Lyndhurst in Hampshire.

This car was then recovered by the company in 1948. Since then, it has been used as a publicity car and travelled worldwide. In 1991, the car was restored. This retained all-metal wheels rather than returning to the original wooden artillery wheels.(see the 1907 photograph with Claude Johnson). (Note: The 1907 photograph shows bolts with wing nuts through the felloes. These helped to hold the tyre onto the rim; see Fig. 237 of Baudry de Saunier: L'automobile théorique et pratique (1899) v.2, https://babel.hathitrust.org/cgi/pt?id=coo.31924022823789&seq=400. By 1909 they had been superseded by metal flanges fixed to the felloes with rim nuts; see the photograph of the Science Museum's 1909 Hooper landaulet.)

In 2005 it was noted to be the world's most valuable car, its insured value was placed at US$35 million.

After the 1998 sale of Rolls-Royce Motors Ltd the car passed into the ownership of Bentley Motors.

In January 2020 Bentley Motors sold the car to collector Sir Michael Kadoorie, together with the only surviving Rolls-Royce 10 hp that is still roadworthy.

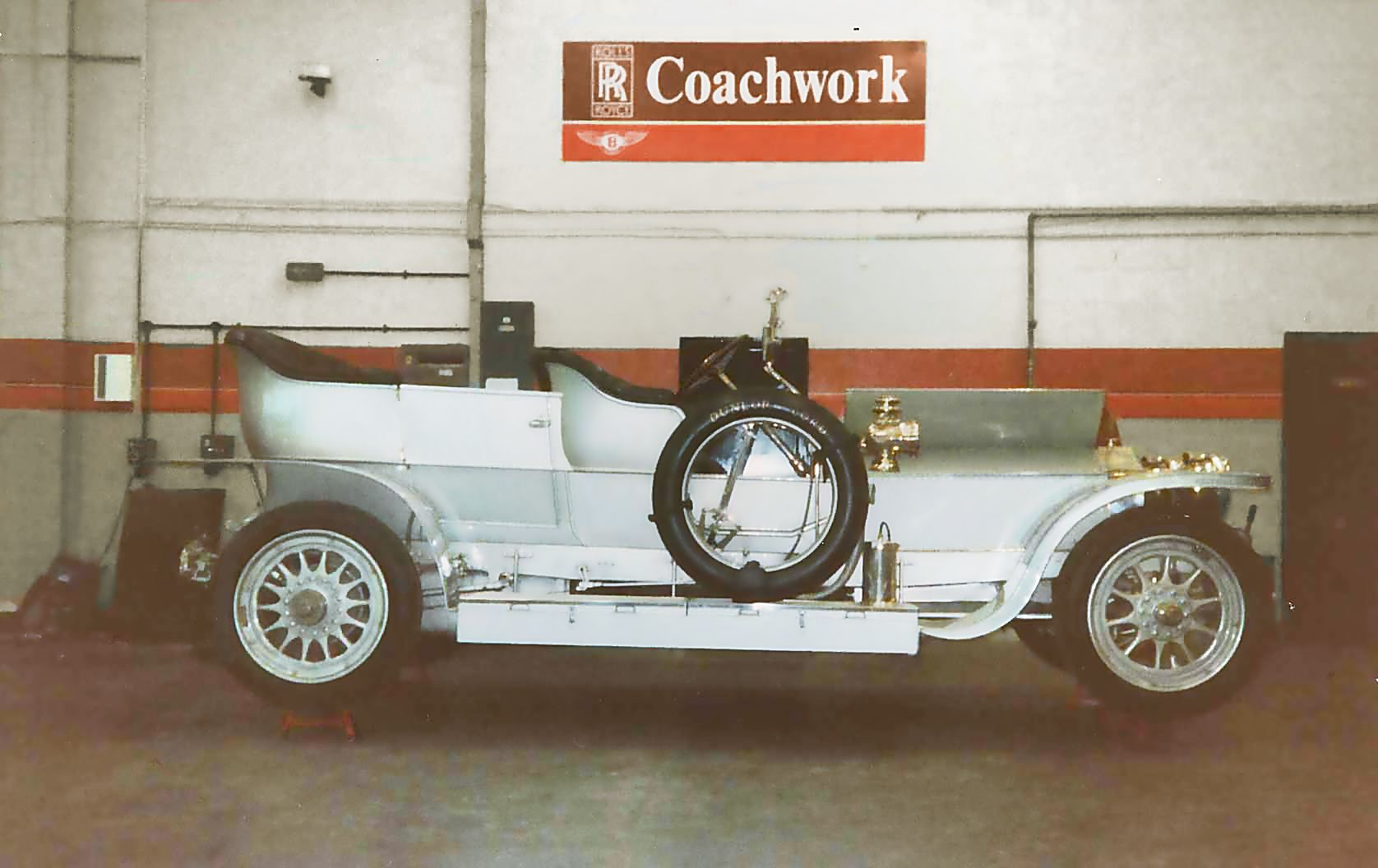
AX 201 in a photo from 1990, prior to restoration

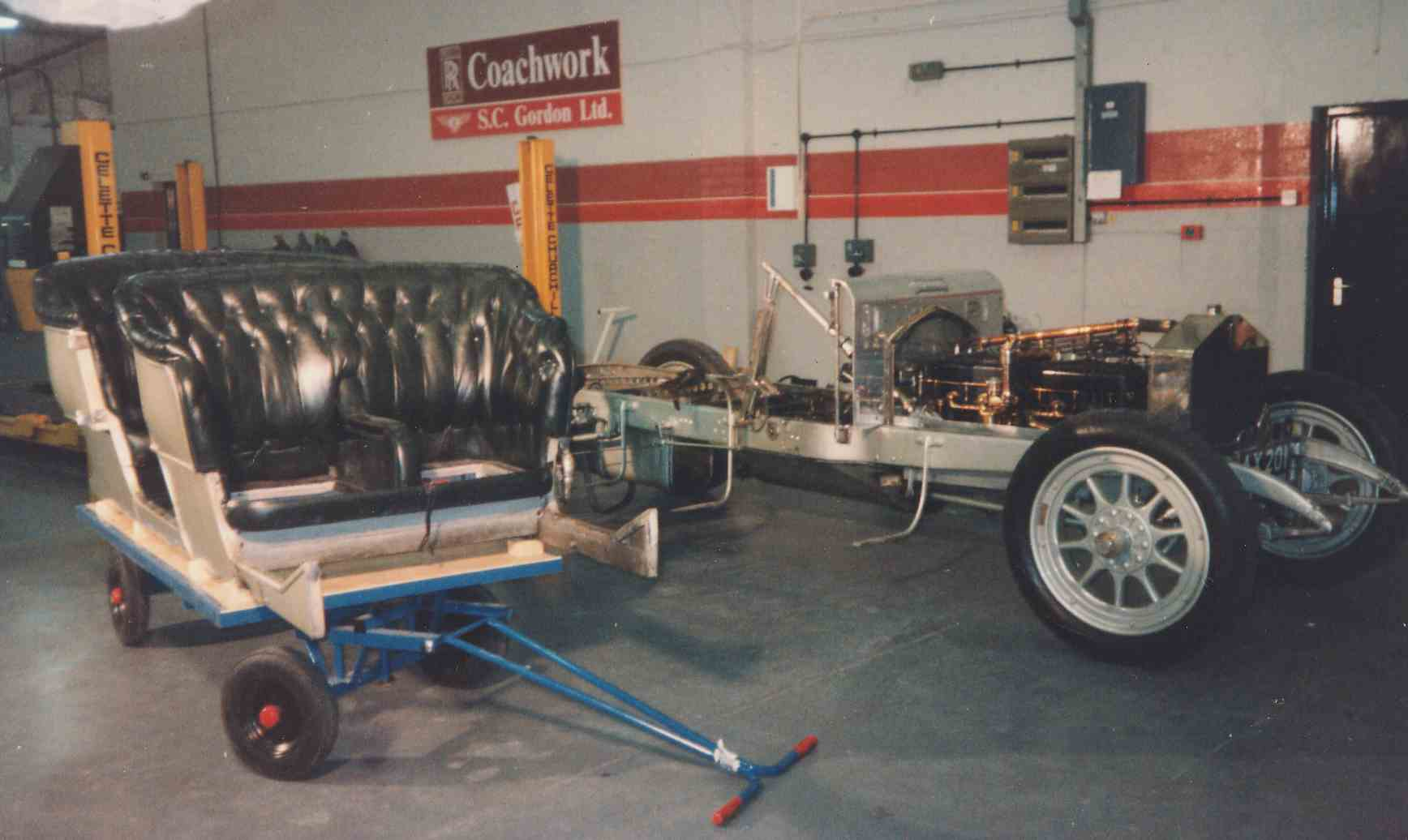
AX 201 with body & chassis separated

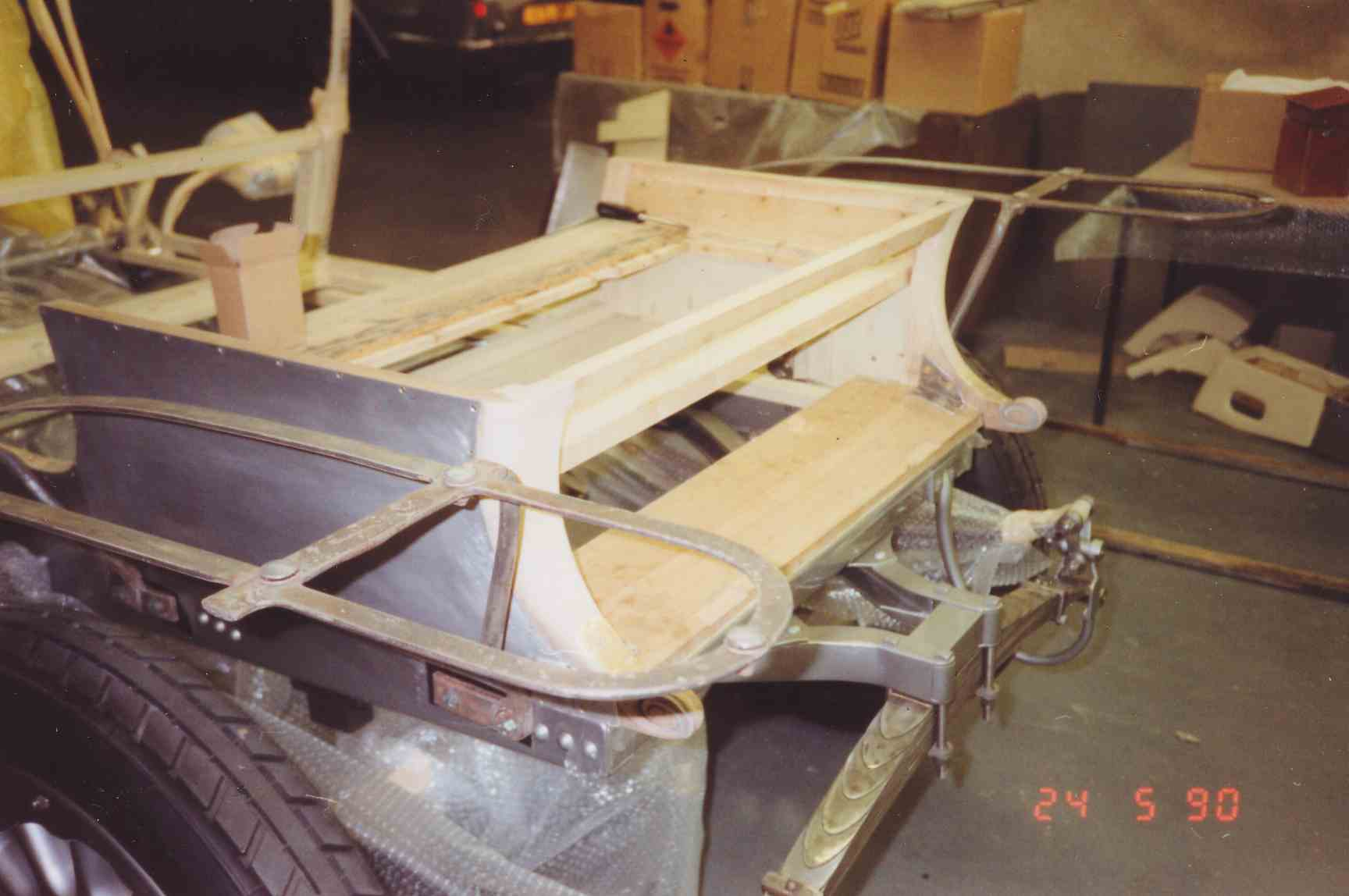
AX 201 rear end showing ash frame

== Gallery ==
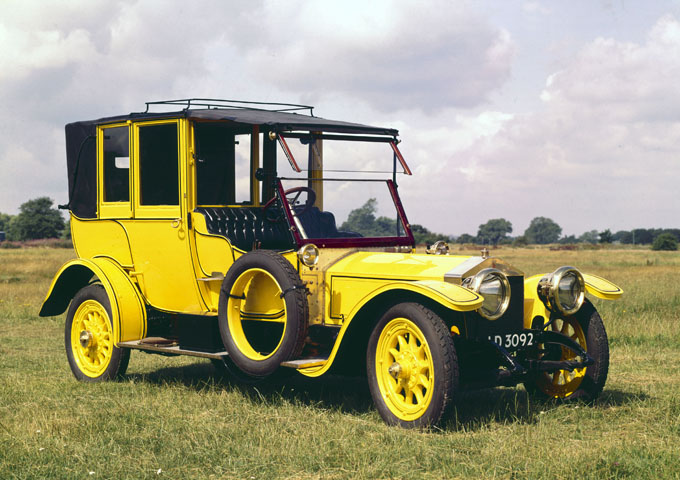
1909 landaulet by Hooper, Science Museum, London

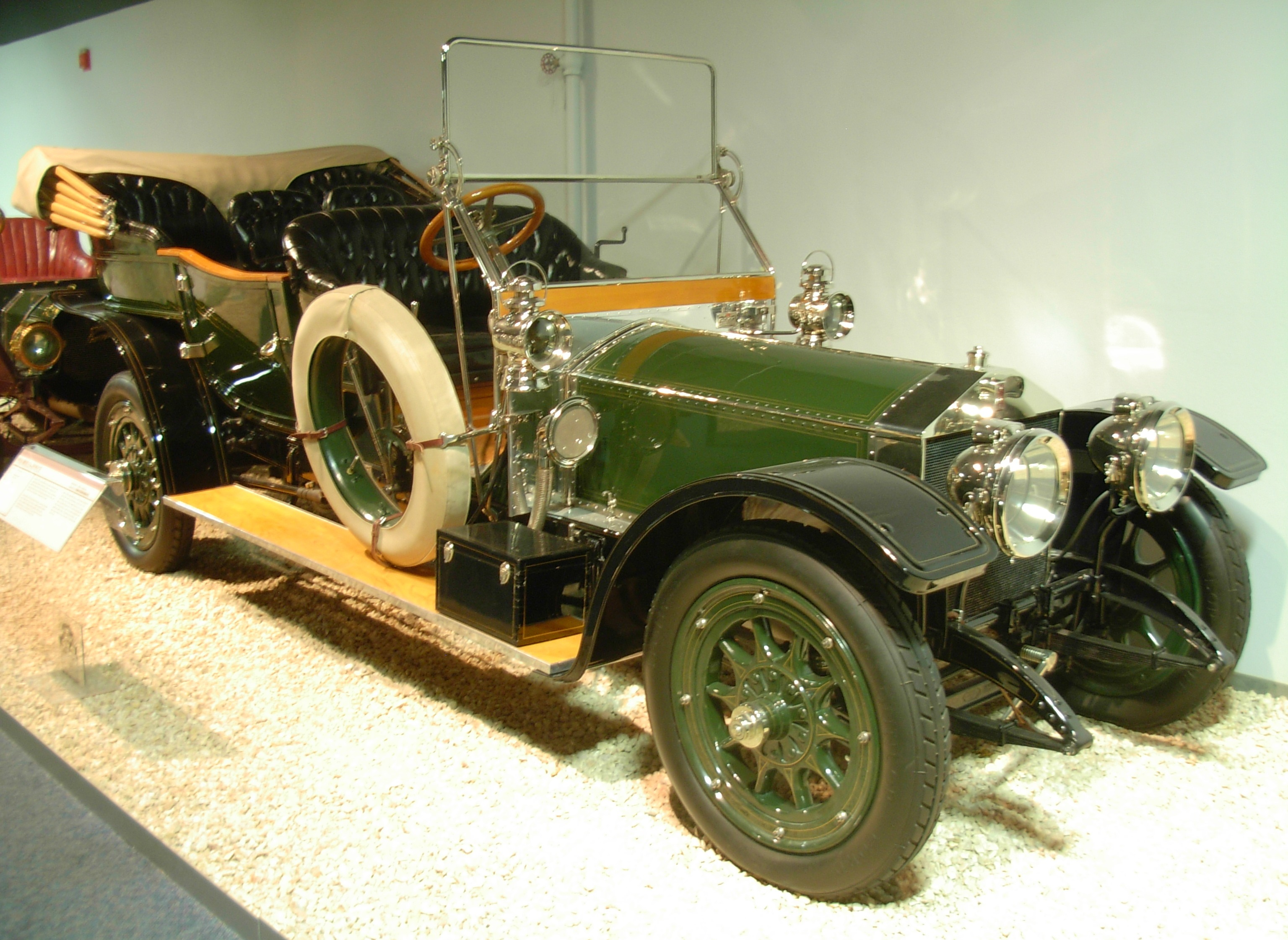
1910 tourer, National Automobile Museum, Reno

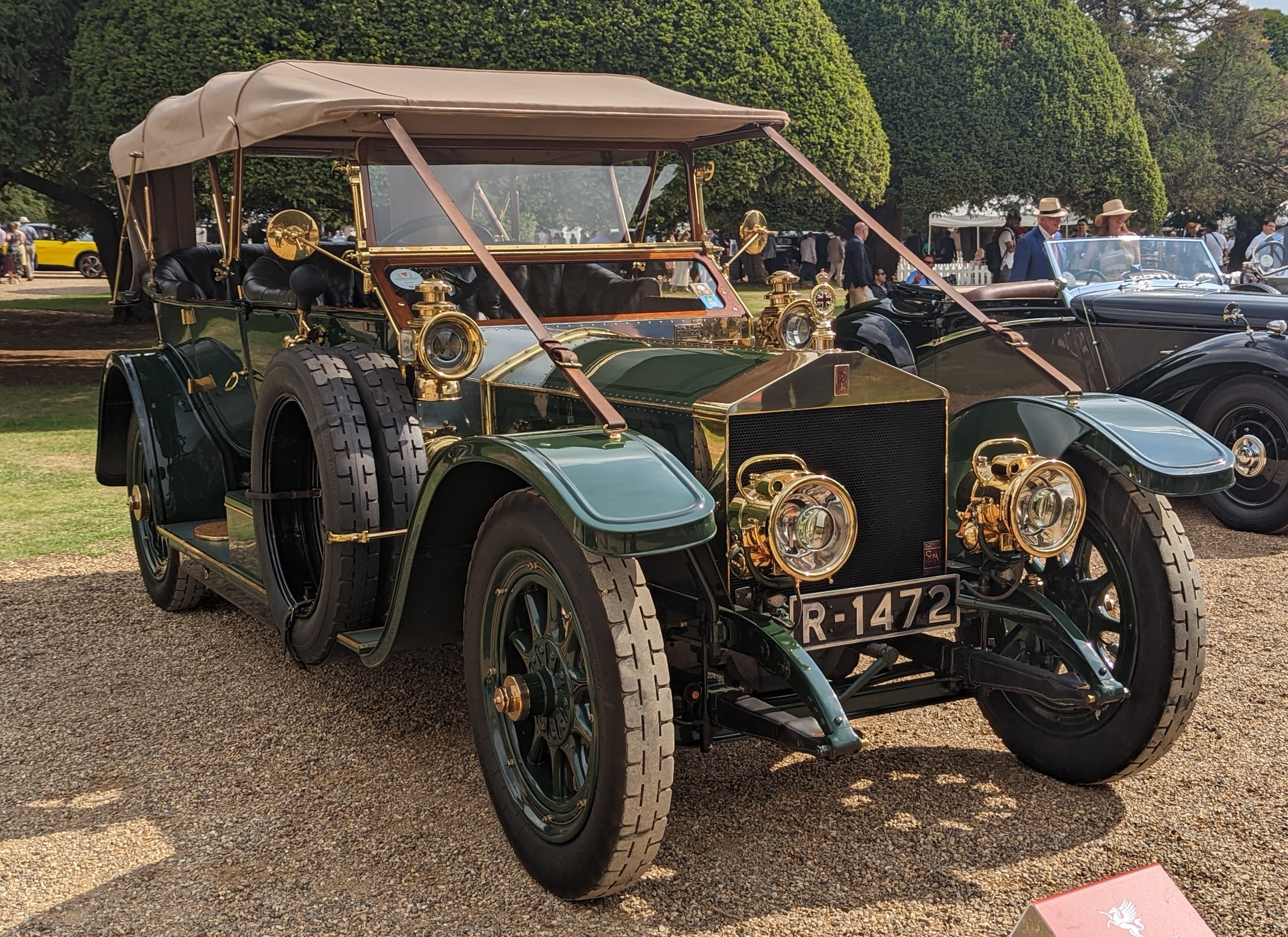
1912 Tourer

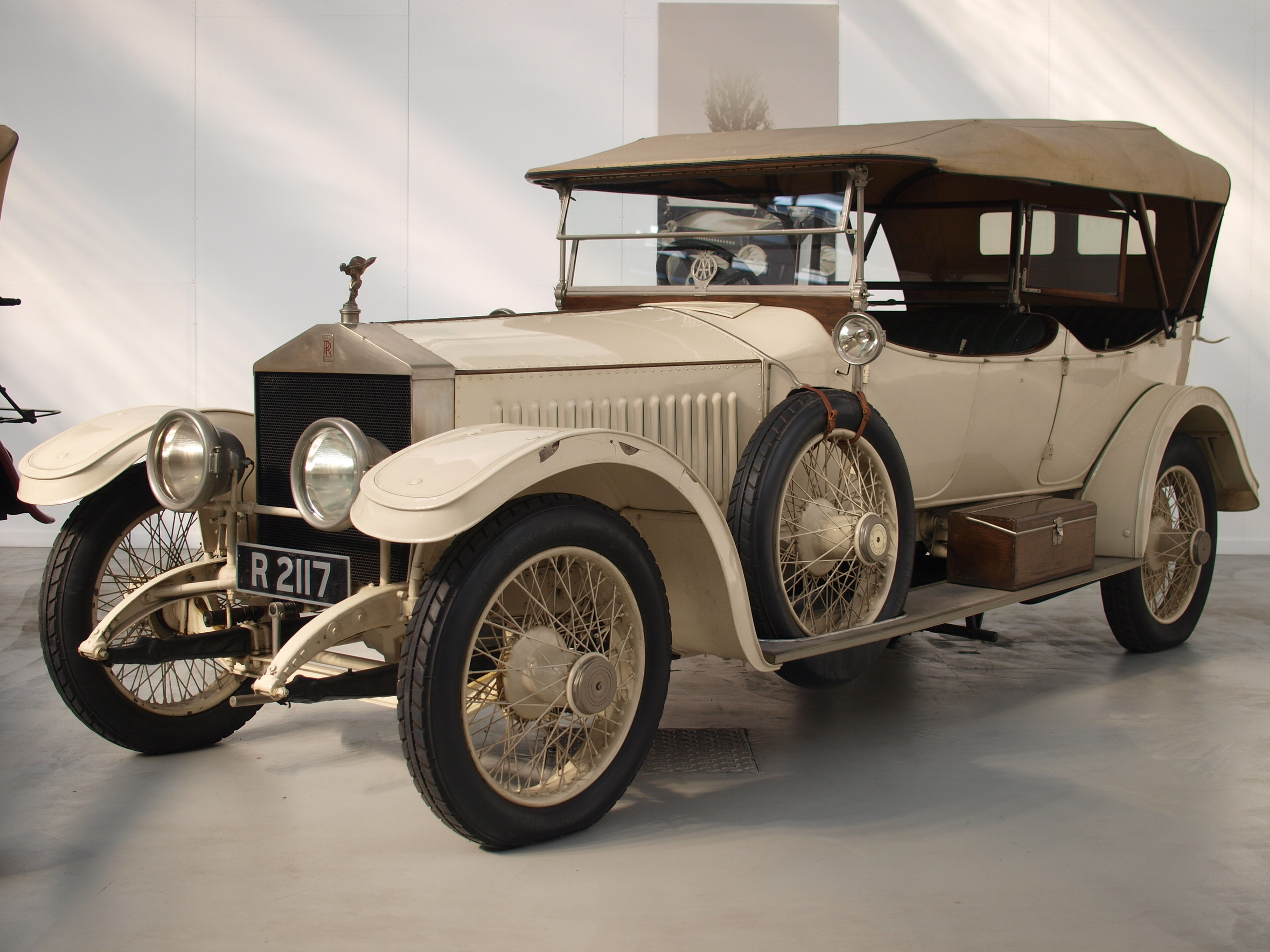
1914 tourer in Museo Nazionale dell'Automobile, Torino

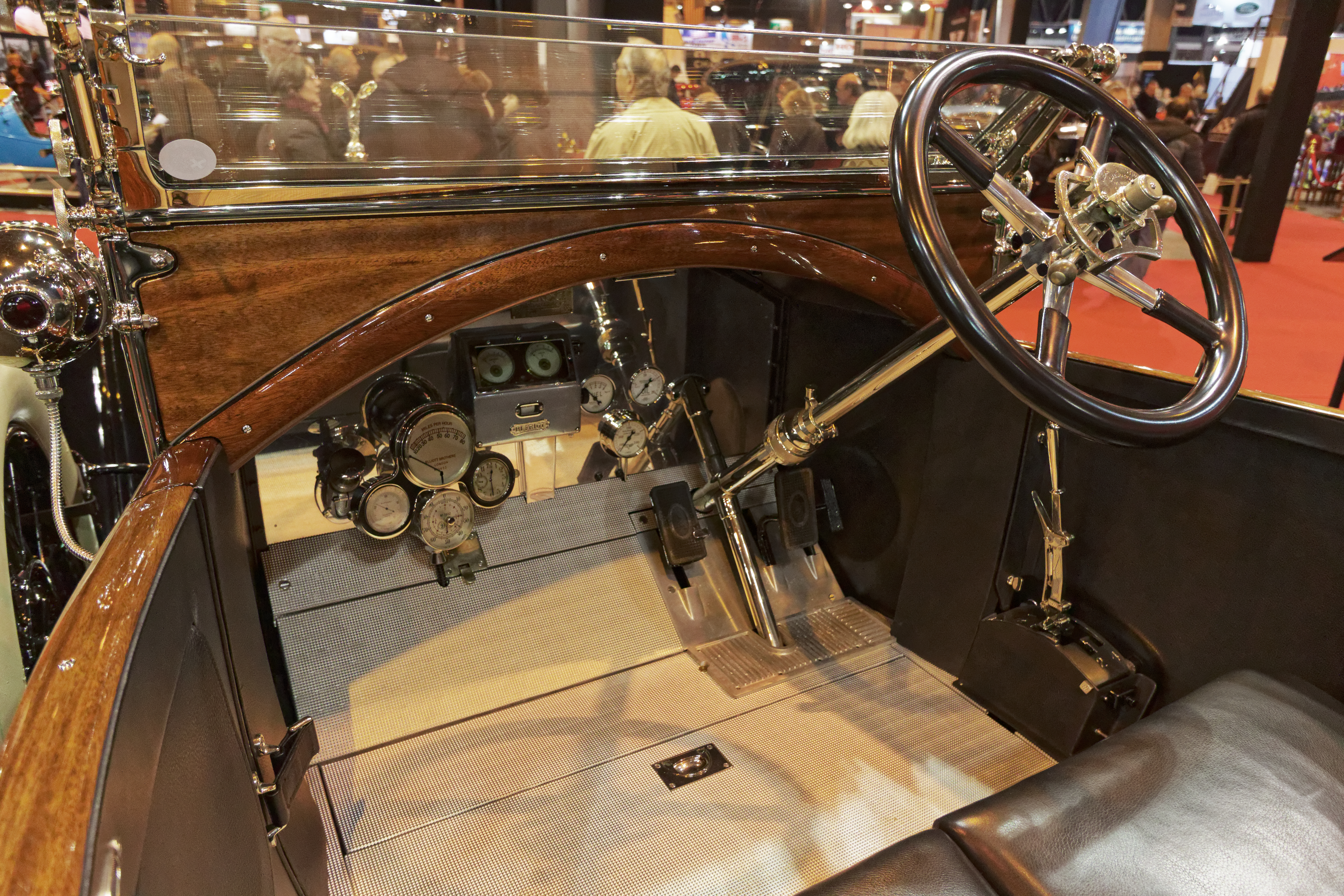
1914 Silver Ghost by Kellner interior

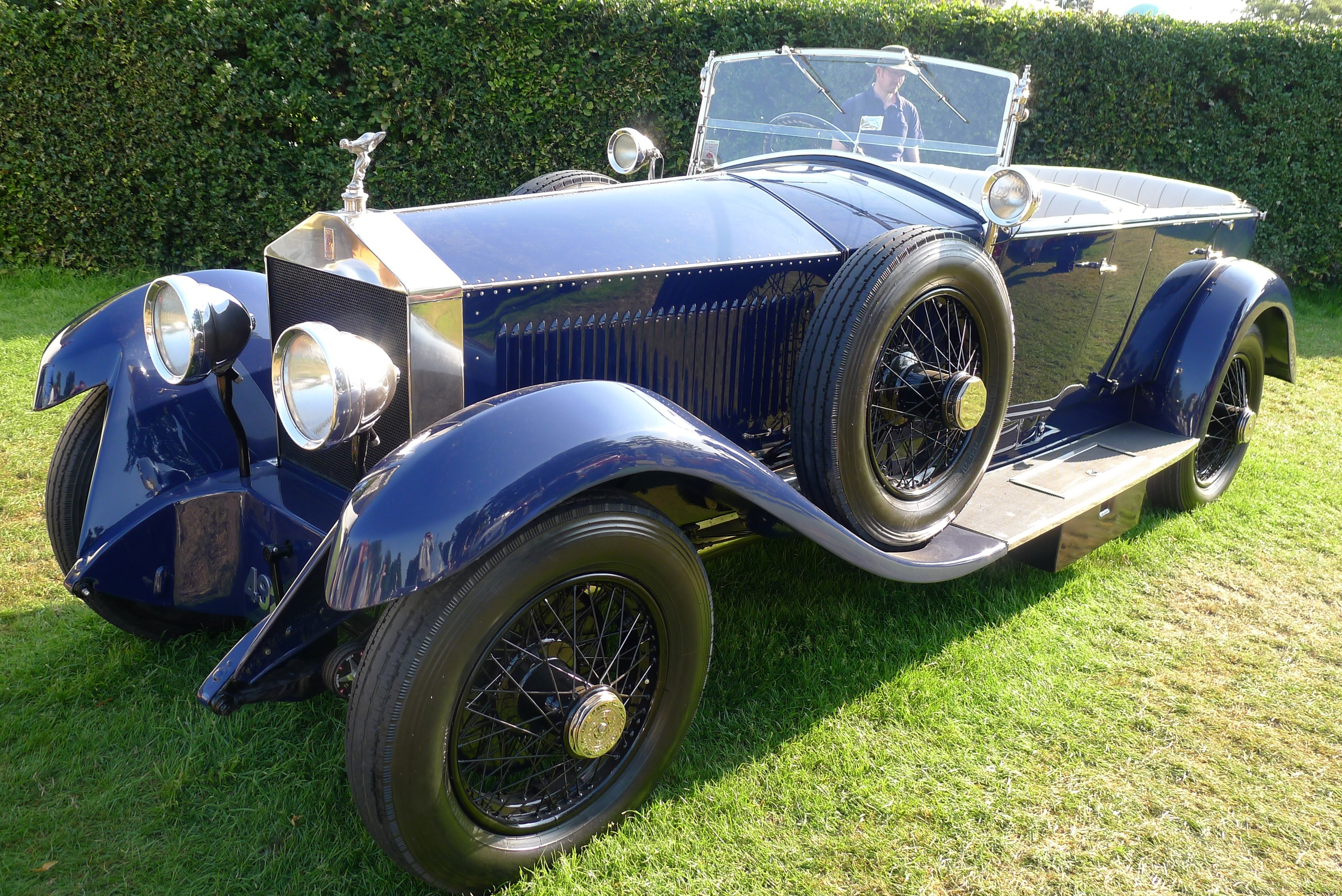
1920 chassis 40FW tourer by Labourdette

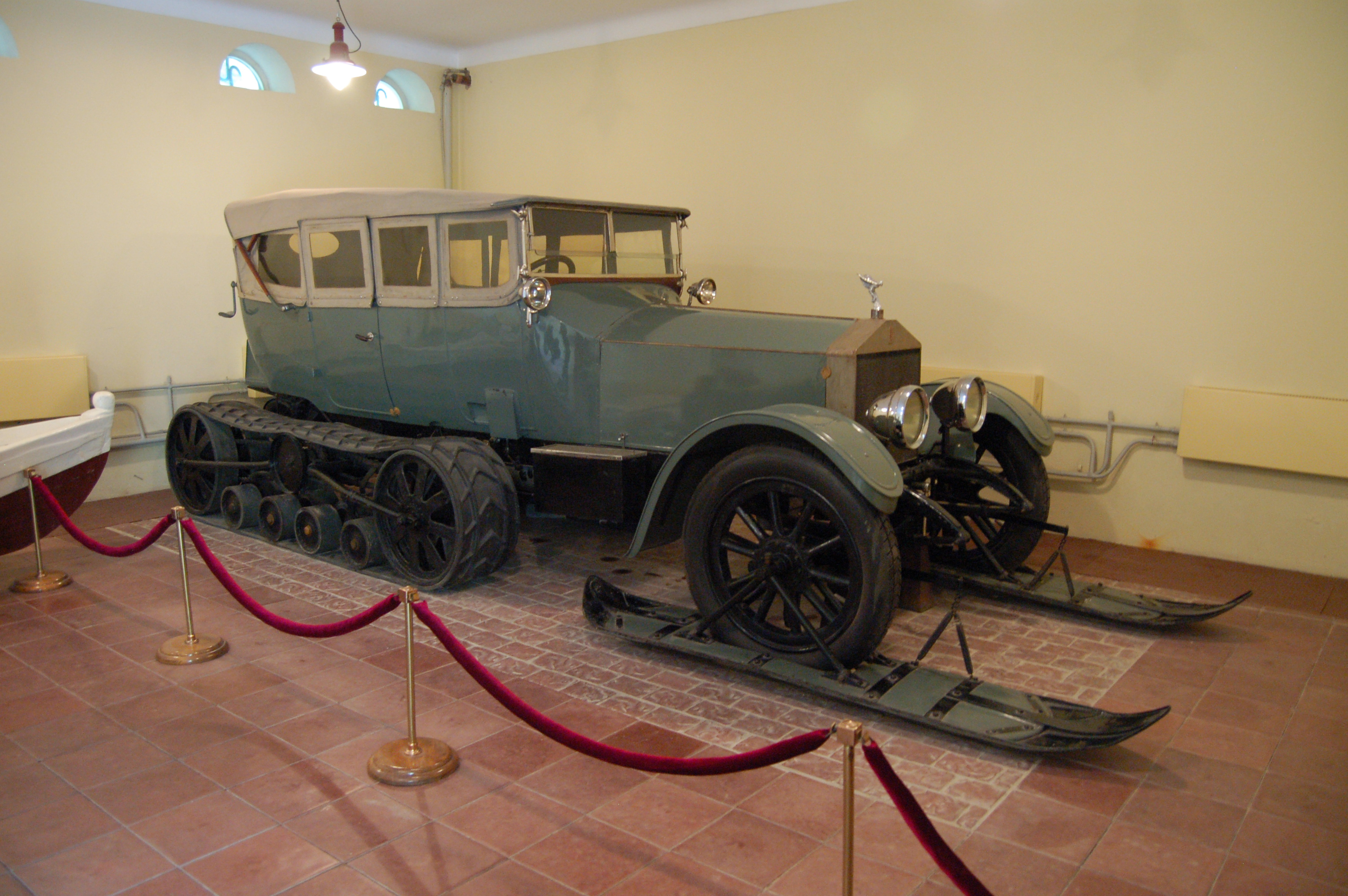
A 1922 half-track owned by Vladimir Lenin, at Gorki Leninskiye

Ahmad Shah Qajar's 1922 Rolls-Royce Silver Ghost in National Car Museum of Iran

== See also ==
- Rolls-Royce Armoured Car
