= Barker (coachbuilder) =

British coachbuilder

Coordinates: 51.509989°N 0.218014°W

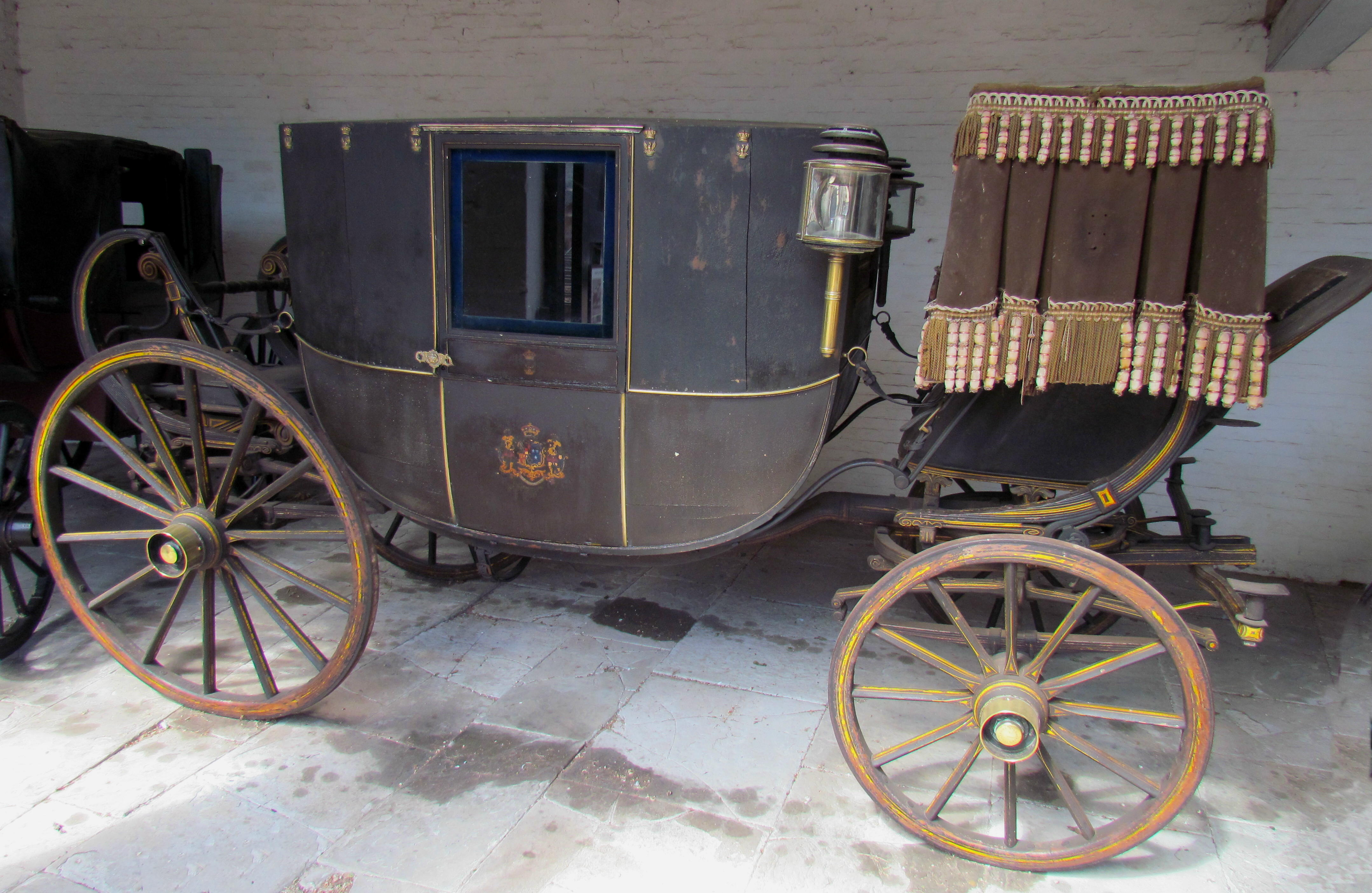
An 1890 state coach for the Marquess of Hertford

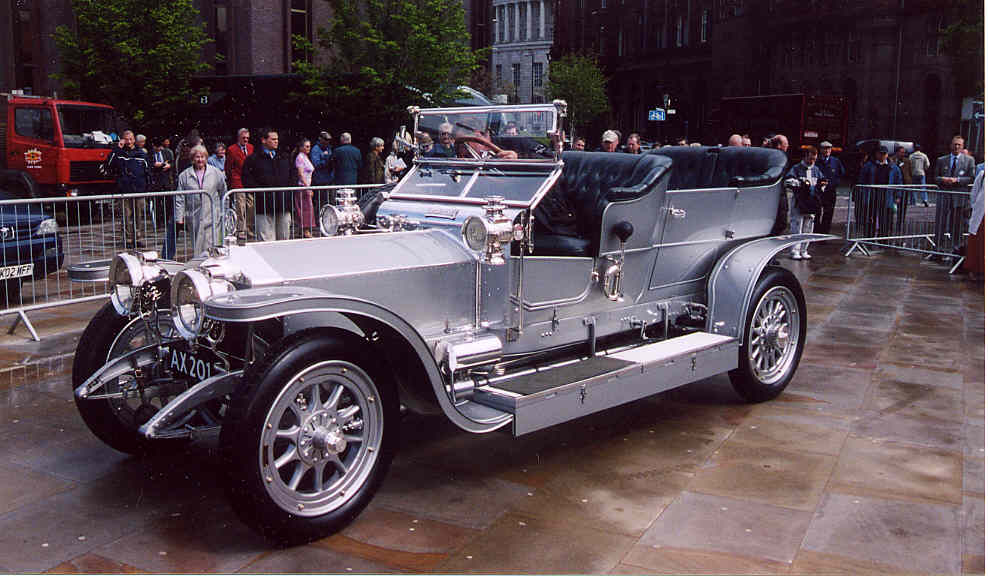
The Silver Ghost semi Roi-des-Belges open tourer Rolls-Royce 40/50 chassis

Barker & Co. was a British coachbuilder, a maker of carriages and in the 20th century bodywork for prestige cars, including Rolls-Royce, Bentley, and Daimler.

== History ==
Founded in London in 1710 (Note: Coventry Archives: ref. PA1356. Barker & Co. Administrative history: Barker and Company, founded 1710, address Chandos Street, London. Reformed as Barker & Company (Coachbuilders) in 1905. Taken over by Hooper & Company (Coachbuilders), St James Street, London. The firm was taken over by B.S.A. and assigned to Daimler (a B.S.A. subsidiary) c.1940) by a guards officer it more recently traded as Barker & Co. Limited. After the 1920s Barker & Co seemed to be unable to keep up with advances in the use of light alloys for framing. Requests for sturdier bodies were met by using heavier components which hampered the finished product's performance. Baker manufactured a C. Spring Barouche landau for E. P. Taylor, which is now owned by Ontario Jockey Club for use during the King's Plate in Toronto. The company fell into receivership in 1938 and its brand name and business were taken over by its long-term rival Hooper & Co which in its turn was taken over by Daimler in 1940 and so became part of the BSA group.

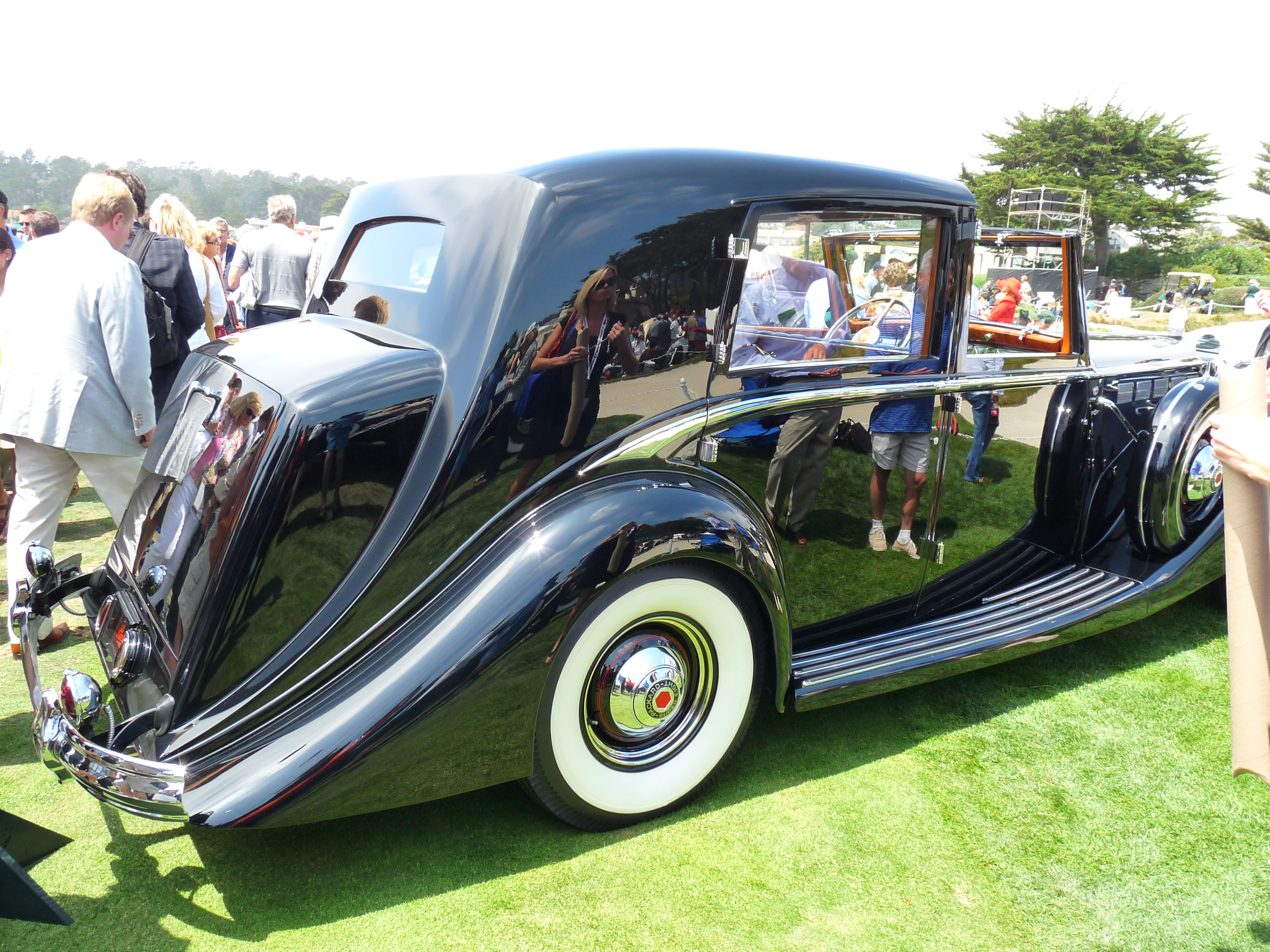
sedanca de ville 1938 Packard 1605 chassis

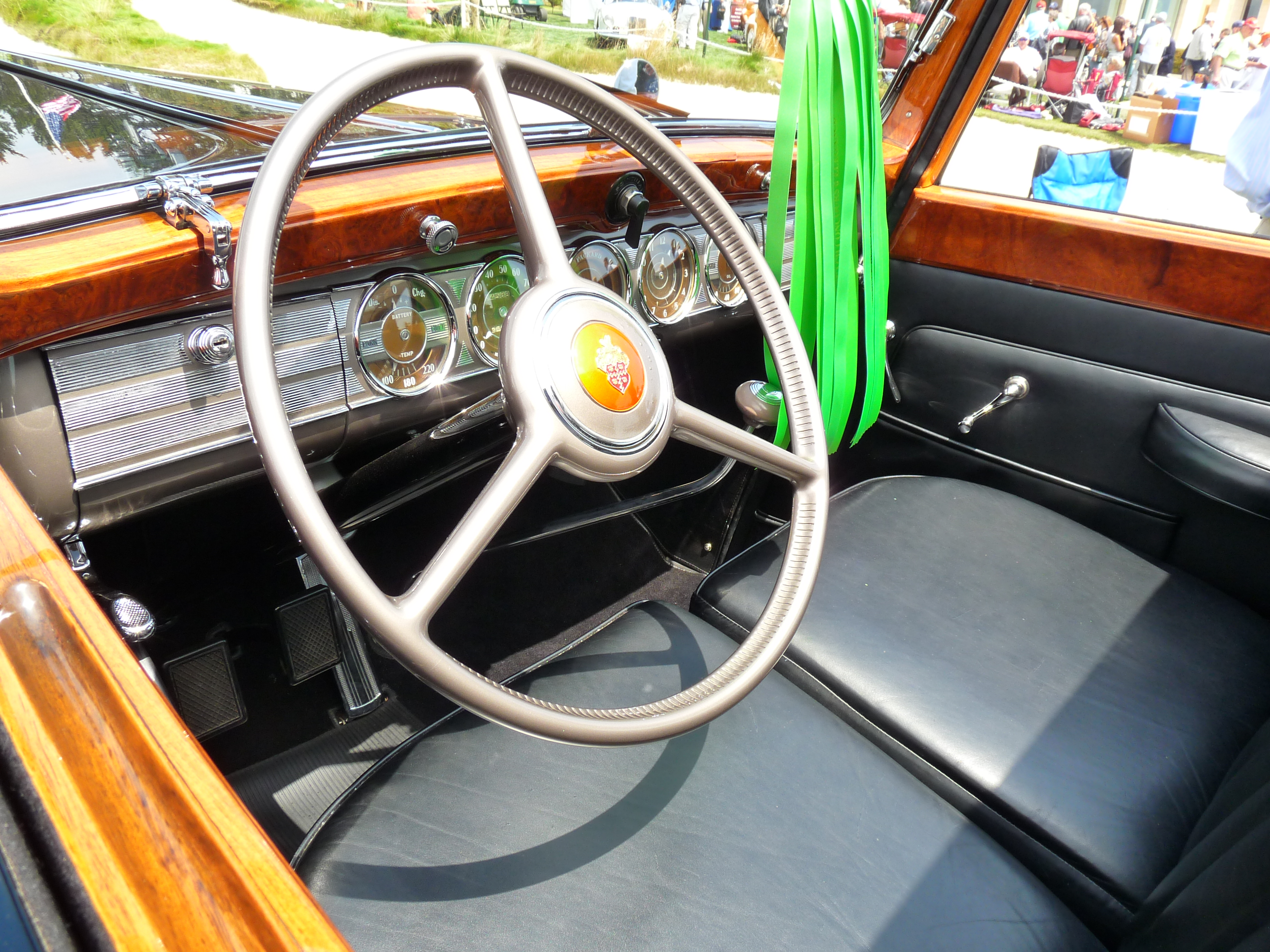

Barker was the recommended bodywork supplier for early Rolls-Royce cars, although the choice was the customer's and there were several other prominent builders. One such Rolls-Royce with Barker bodywork was The Silver Ghost built for Rolls-Royce for use in their publicity activities.

Some idea of the scale of their operations may be gauged from their advertisement in The Times on the opening of the 1912 Motor Show at London's Olympia. They described themselves as Coachbuilders to H.M. The King, London Retailers and Body Specialists for Rolls-Royce Cars. They advised the reader that Barker Bodies on Rolls-Royce chassis may be viewed on their own stand 146 as well as on Rolls-Royce Stand 72. The note is added: "Nearly 100 Rolls-Royce Cars, with Barker Bodies, of various types to order, can always be seen in course of completion at our Works. Complete Rolls-Royce Cars ready for immediate delivery". 66–68, South Audley Street, London W. Telephone Mayfair 5435.

Rolls-Royce did not provide their own bodywork until early 1946, when they introduced the Rolls-Royce and Bentley standard steel saloons using components made by Pressed Steel Limited of Coventry in place of a coachbuilder's hand-formed shapes (see W A Robotham). These pressings were assembled and finished and the bodies fitted out at their former aero-engine factory at Crewe. However, Park Ward, another coachbuilder which had come to specialise in Rolls-Royce and Bentley bodies, had been a wholly owned subsidiary of Rolls-Royce since 1939.

As well as Rolls-Royce and Bentley, Barker also constructed bodywork on chassis by other manufacturers including Daimler, Napier, Packard, Cadillac, Duesenberg, and Mercedes-Benz.

- Rolls-Royce

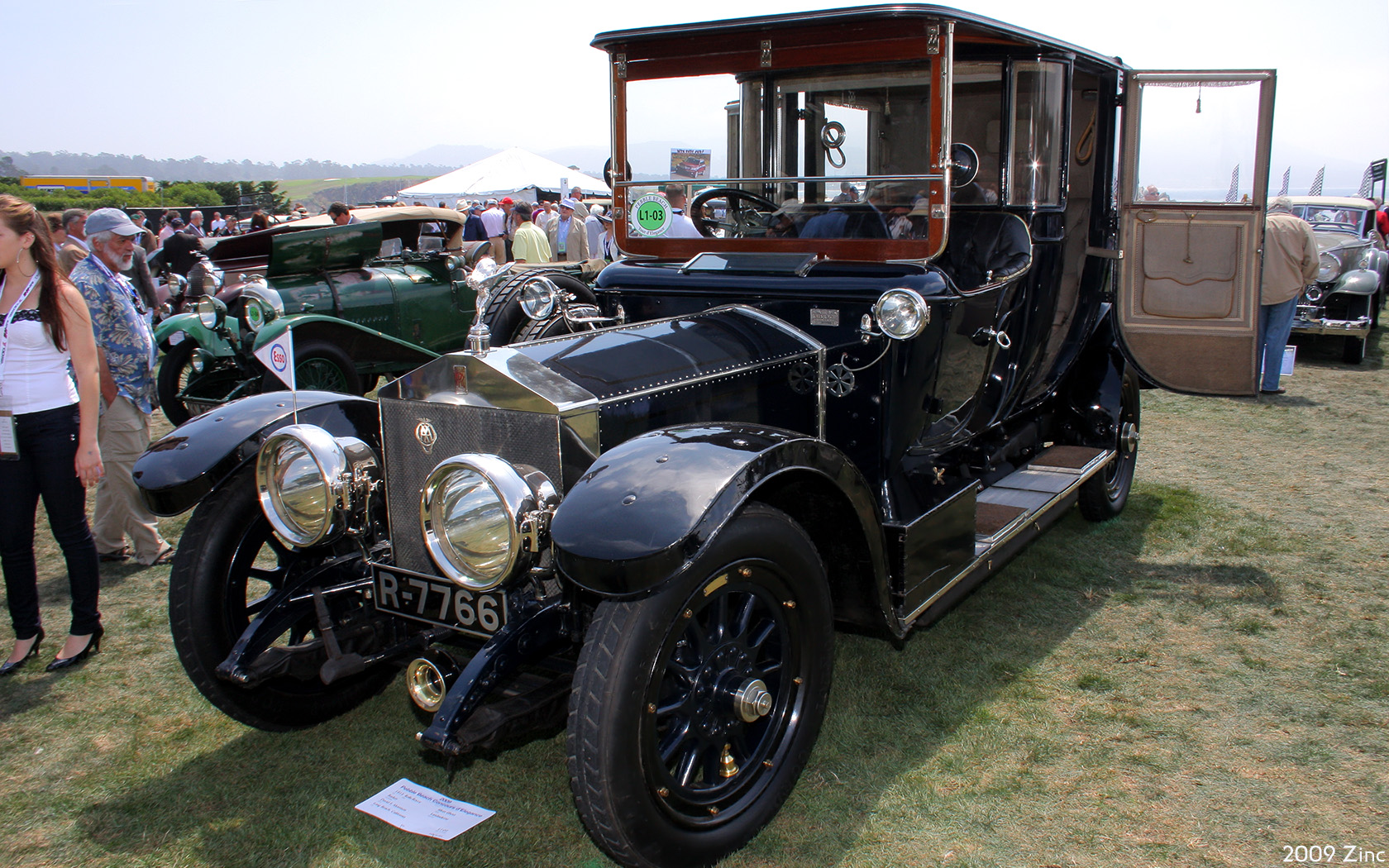
1913 landaulette on a Rolls-Royce 40/50 Silver Ghost chassis

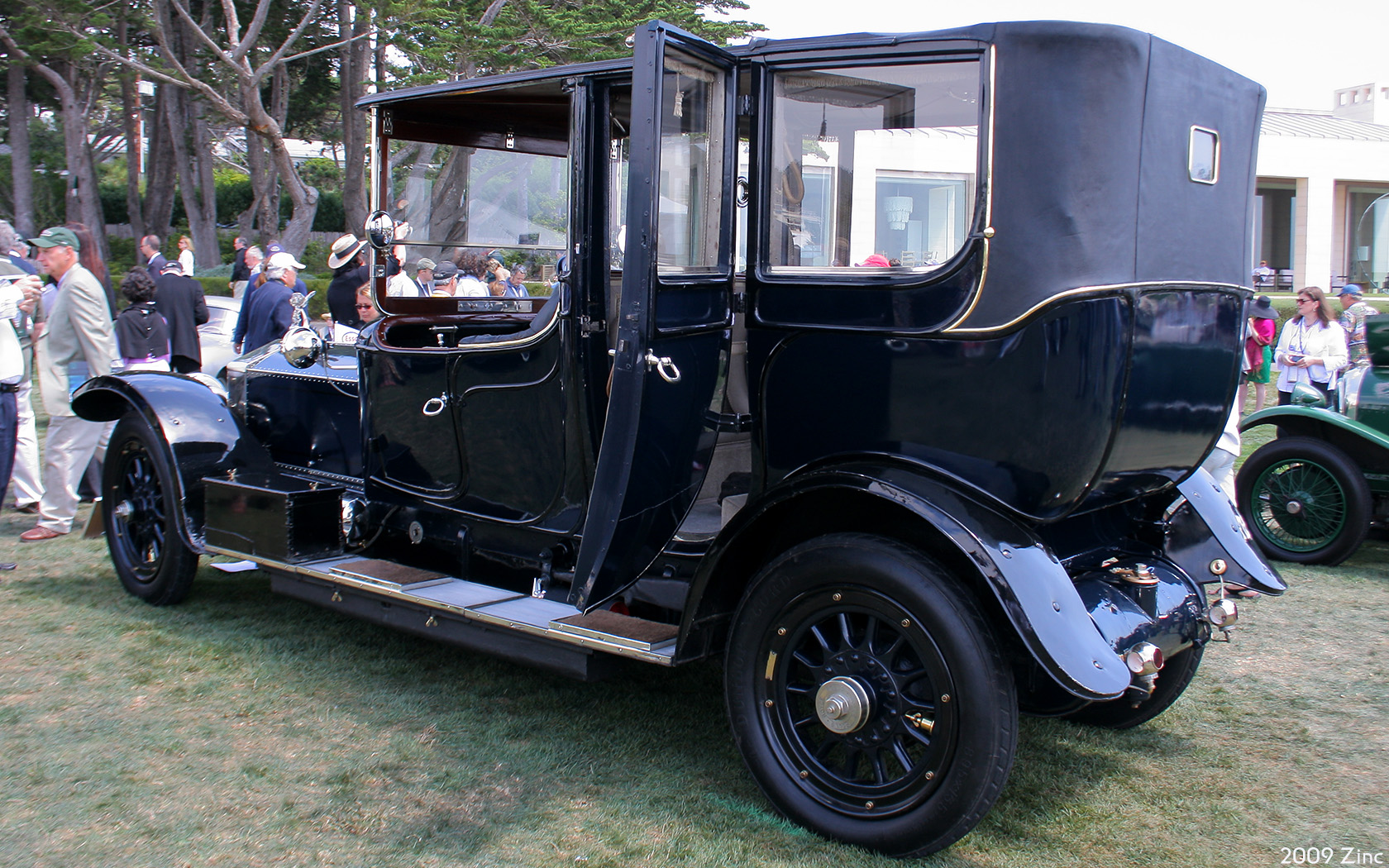
The same 1913 car, different angle

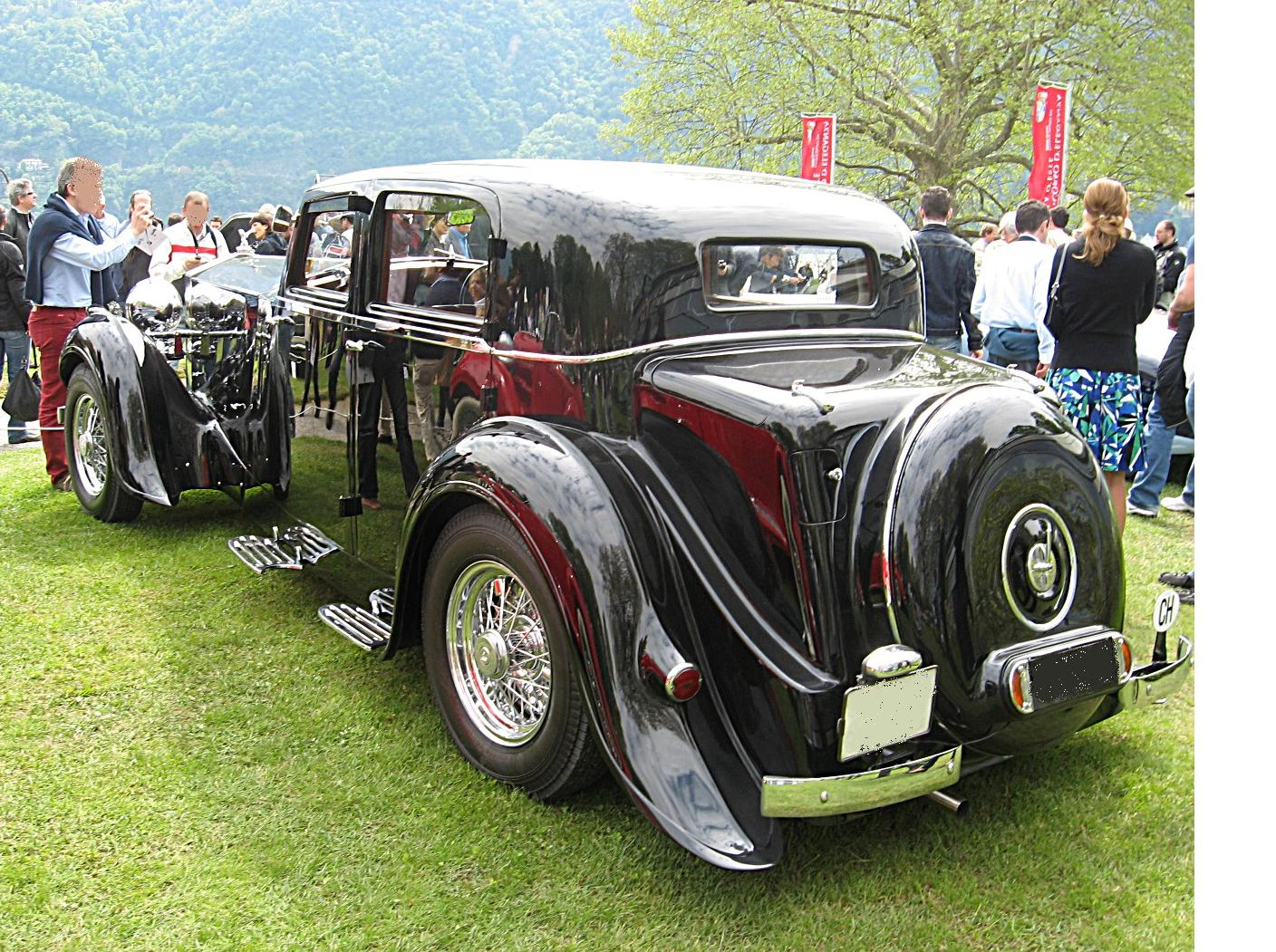
sports saloon on Phantom III chassis 1937

- Daimler 'special sports' coupés

One of these coupés was the personal car of Princess Elizabeth.

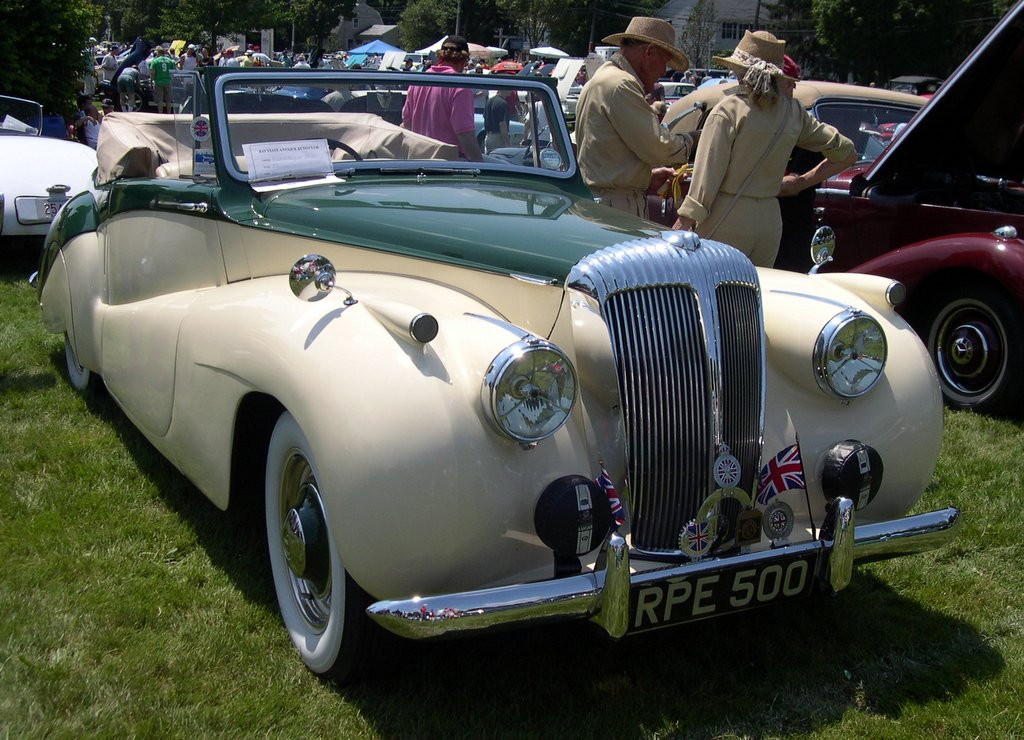

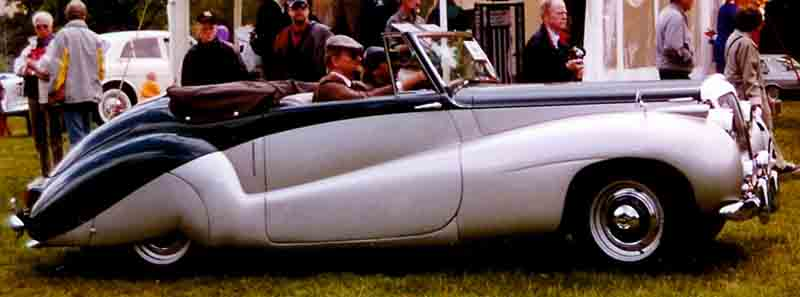

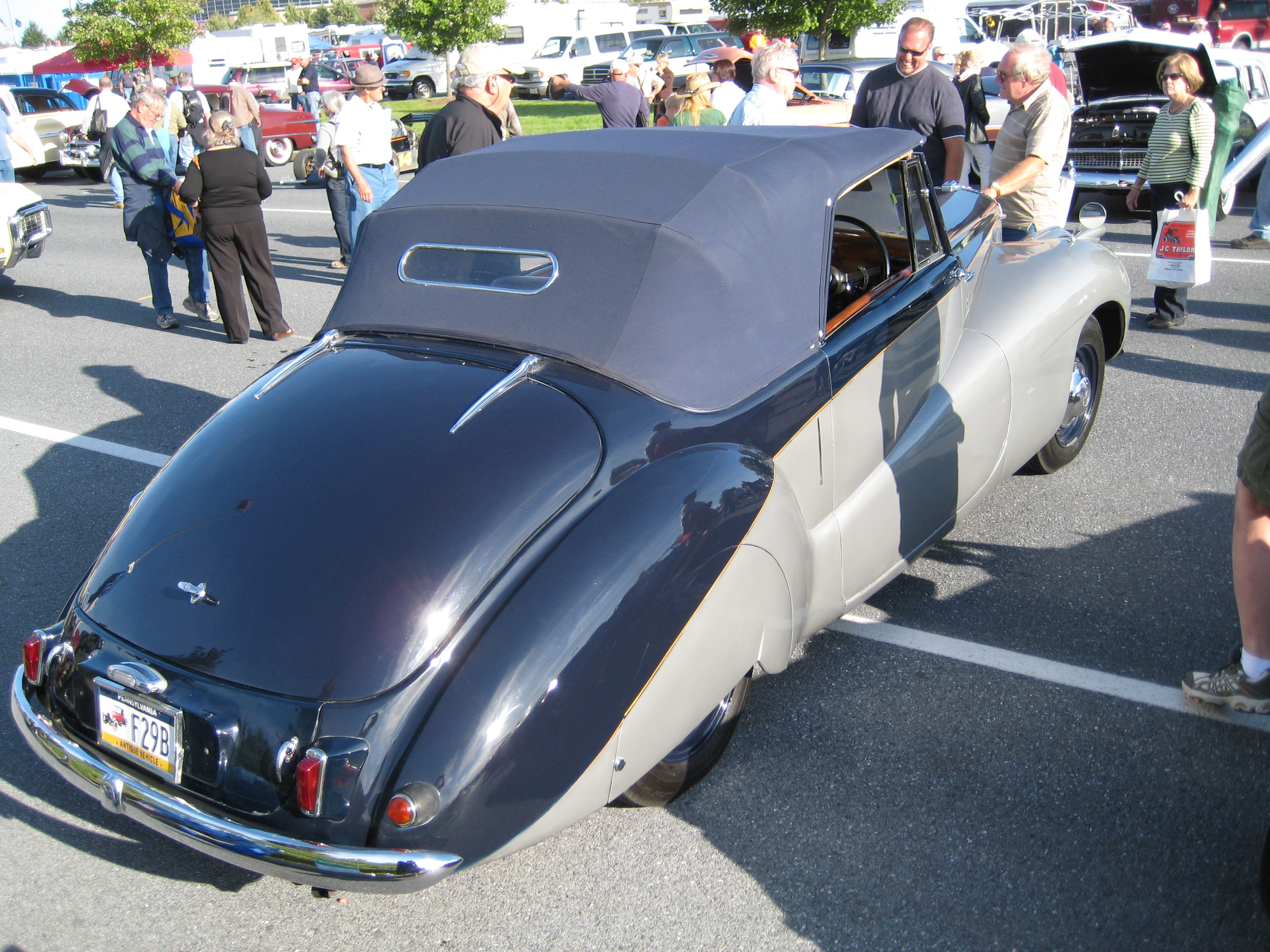

== Locations ==
From the announcement of their opening of new factory premises in Willesden 2 January 1939.

Barker & Co., (Coachbuilders) Limited

- Showrooms: 66, South Audley Street, London, W1 (tel. Grosvenor 2421)
- Repair Works: 77, King's Road, Chelsea, S.W.3.(tel. Flaxman 5721)
- Factory: Elvedon Road, Willesden, N.W.10. (tel. Willesden 5901)
