= Mototri Contal =

Emblem of Mototri Contal

The Mototri Contal was a French automobile manufactured from 1907 until 1908. More elaborate than most three-wheelers of its era, it featured Roi-des-Belges bodywork on its more expensive models; the company also manufactured delivery tricycles. One of the firm's tricars was featured in the 1907 Peking-Paris Race.
