= Roi-des-Belges =

Car Body Style

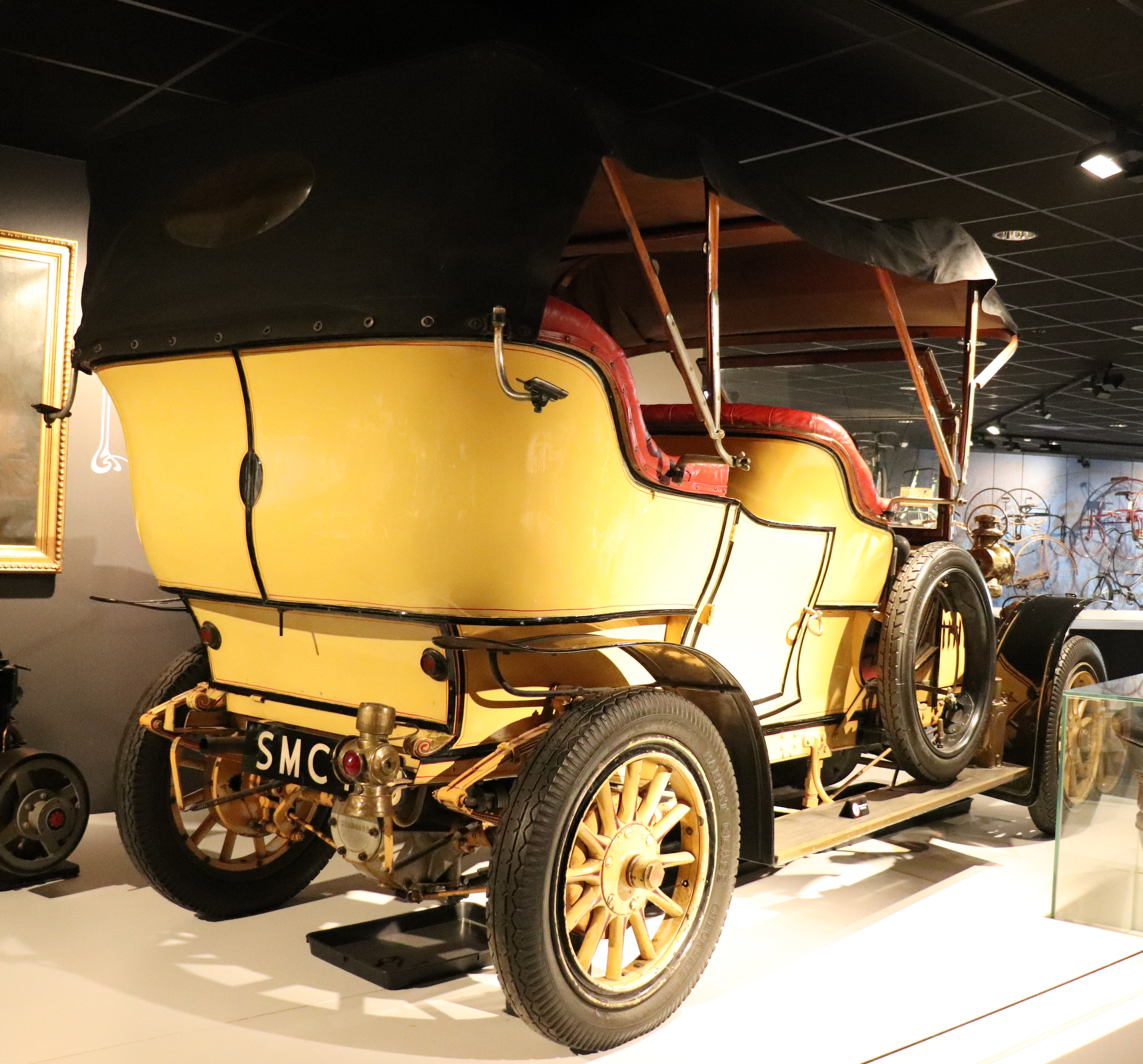
1907 Roi-des-Belges body on a Standard Thirty chassis

Roi-des-Belges ("King of the Belgians") or tulip phaeton was a car body style used on luxury motor vehicles in the early 1900s. It was a double phaeton with the back seats being raised with exaggerated armrests "suggestive of a tulip". These features created a touring car with a dramatic presence compared to typical single tiered seating. Most roi-des-Belges bodies would have two rows of bench seats, but some, such as Rolls-Royce Silver Ghost, also featured two additional jump seats between the benches, making them a triple phaeton. (Note: See, for example "1902 De Dietrich 16hp car". Bonhams.)

The Roi-des-Belges style began with a 1901 Panhard et Levassor with a Rothschild body commissioned by Leopold II of Belgium, giving the body its namesakeRoi des Belges. As the story goes, Leopold invited Ferdinand Charles of Rothschild bodies to spend time with himself and dancer Cleo de Merode. There, Merode pushed two armchairs together suggested to that, rather than an uncomfortable backseat, cars should feel closer to those upholstered armchairs.

The style and the name Roi-des-Belges were used on many makes of the time, including Mototri Contal, Packard, Rolls-Royce Silver Ghost, Spyker, and Renault and by other coachwork builders.

The roi-des-Belges style, like all phaeton style cars, fell out of fashion in the late 1910s. This coincides with the phasing out of phaeton bodies as a whole in 20s when fully enclosed vehicles became less expensive. The last car produced with a roi-des-Belges body was made in 1911 before the Silver Ghost switched to an enclosed design.
