= State and royal cars of the United Kingdom =

Official royal street vehicles in the UK

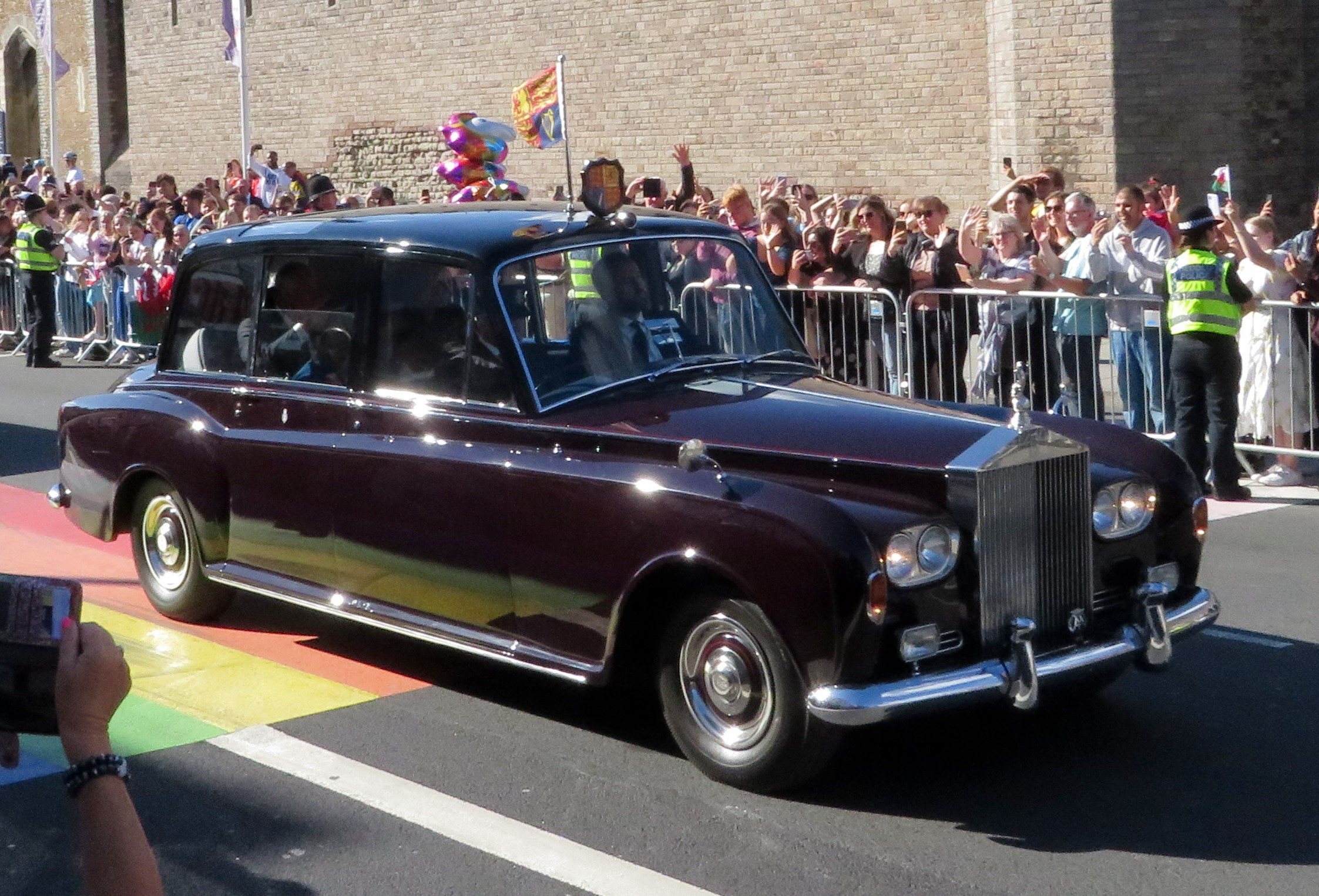
King Charles III being driven through Cardiff in a 1978 Rolls-Royce Phantom VI State limousine, the Silver Jubilee Car.

The state and royal cars of the United Kingdom are kept at the Royal Mews, Buckingham Palace, where a wide range of state road vehicles (including horse-drawn carriages) are kept and maintained. The vehicles also are stored at other royal residences as required.

These cars can be separated into State Cars, Semi-State Cars, State Royal Review Vehicles, Mews support cars and private vehicles.

State Cars are used for public engagements and on ceremonial occasions by the monarch and those representing them or supporting their role as head of state. There are currently five State Cars: two Bentleys and three Rolls-Royces. They are used by the monarch on state and formal occasions, and may also be used by senior members of the Royal Family for official duties. They have been used by the monarch when travelling abroad, as well as at home, and are also made available for heads of state visiting the UK. State vehicles do not display registration plates.

Semi-State Cars are used for less formal situations and general support; unlike the State Cars, they display registration plates. Currently a pair of 2012 Jaguar XJ Limousines and three 2022 Range Rover models are employed in this role.

State Royal Review Vehicles are modified cars designed to carry one or more members of the royal family as standing passengers, for increased visibility at official parades and ceremonies. The current such car is a 2015 Range Rover Hybrid; as a state vehicle it does not have number plates.

A comparatively recent addition to the Royal Mews fleet is the State hearse, which was first used in 2022 following the death of Queen Elizabeth II.

In addition the Royal Mews maintains an array of Land Rovers, Range Rovers, luggage brakes and minibuses for official royal use. These do have number plates, as do the monarch's personal vehicles and those of other members of the royal family.

== General description ==
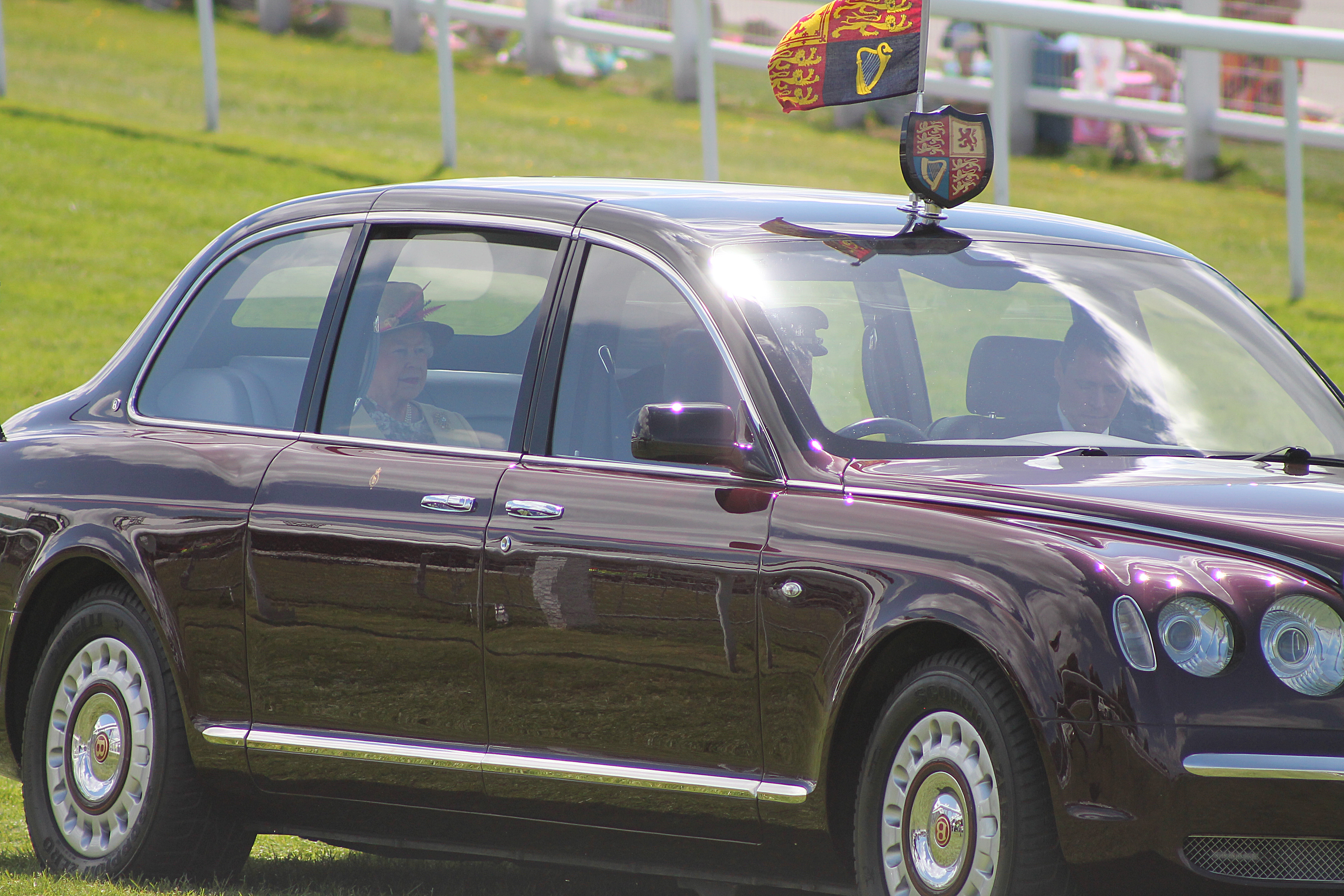
Queen Elizabeth II riding in her 2002 Bentley State Limousine in 2015.

All the state and 'semi-state' vehicles are painted with a distinctive dual-toned colour scheme (or livery), which dates from the reign of King Edward VII: below the beltline, they are painted in Royal Claret (a deep wine colour 'that out of the sunlight looks almost black'), while above the beltline, they are painted Mason's Black; they also feature discrete vermilion pinstriping.

State cars past and present have tended to be limousines with a long-wheelbase, jump seats and a powerful engine for speed when required. They are designed to be imposing and dignified forms of transport for the Head of State. Characteristic design features - such as a raised roofline, bright interior illumination and enlarged windows and sunroofs - enable onlookers to see the occupants.

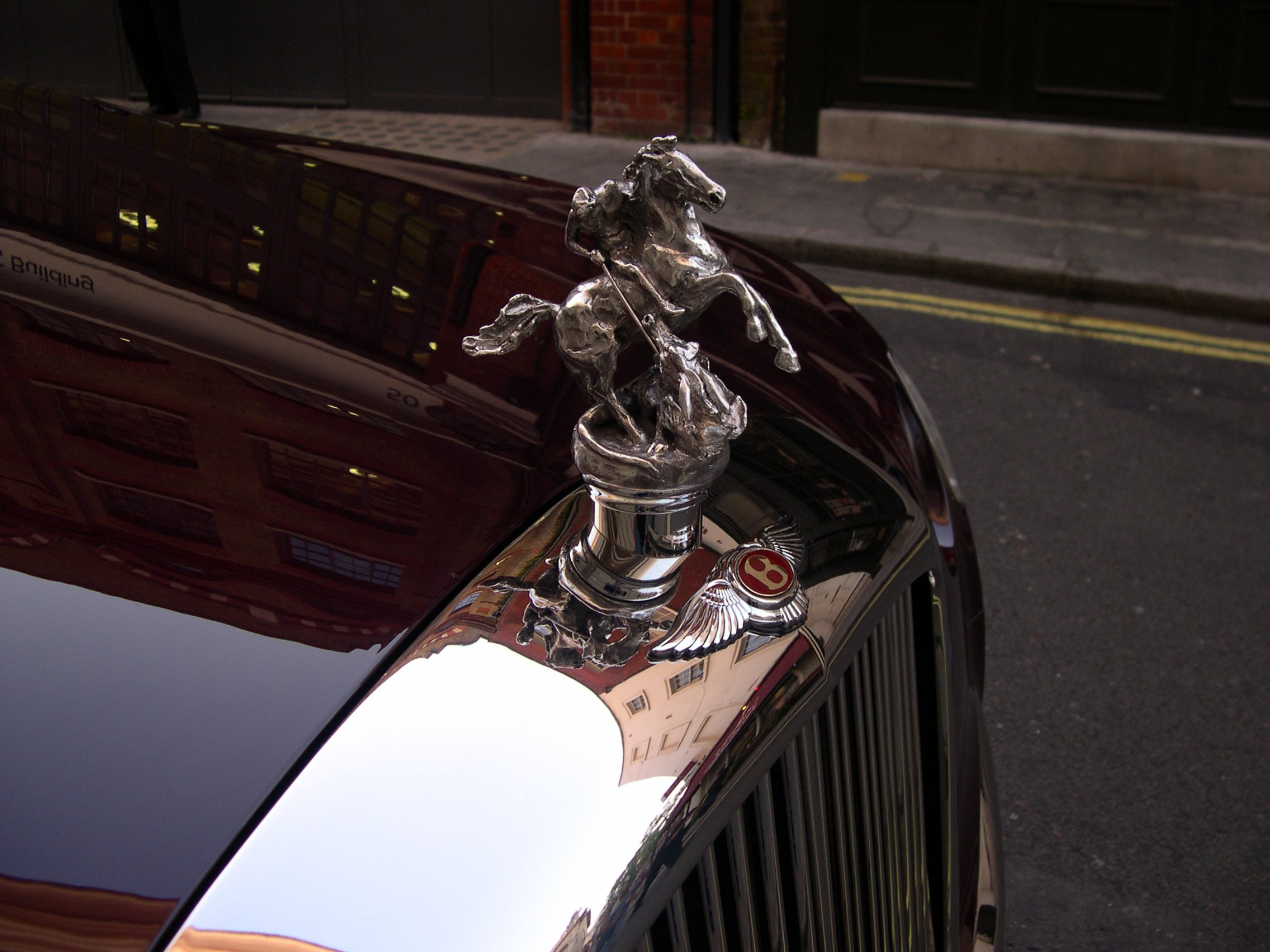
The King's St George and the Dragon mascot was made for his mother, Elizabeth II, by Edward Seago.

On the bonnet of each State and Semi-State Car, there is a mount to which a mascot may be attached. The mascot used depends on the occupant and the location. Three mascots, which have passed through the family, are frequently seen: St George and the Dragon is seen on the Monarch's car in England; a Lion is seen on the Monarch's car in Scotland; and Britannia is also seen, a mascot used by George V, George VI and Queen Elizabeth The Queen Mother (which was used after her death by Charles III, when he was Prince of Wales). When the car is not on state business the standard manufacturers' mascot is used.

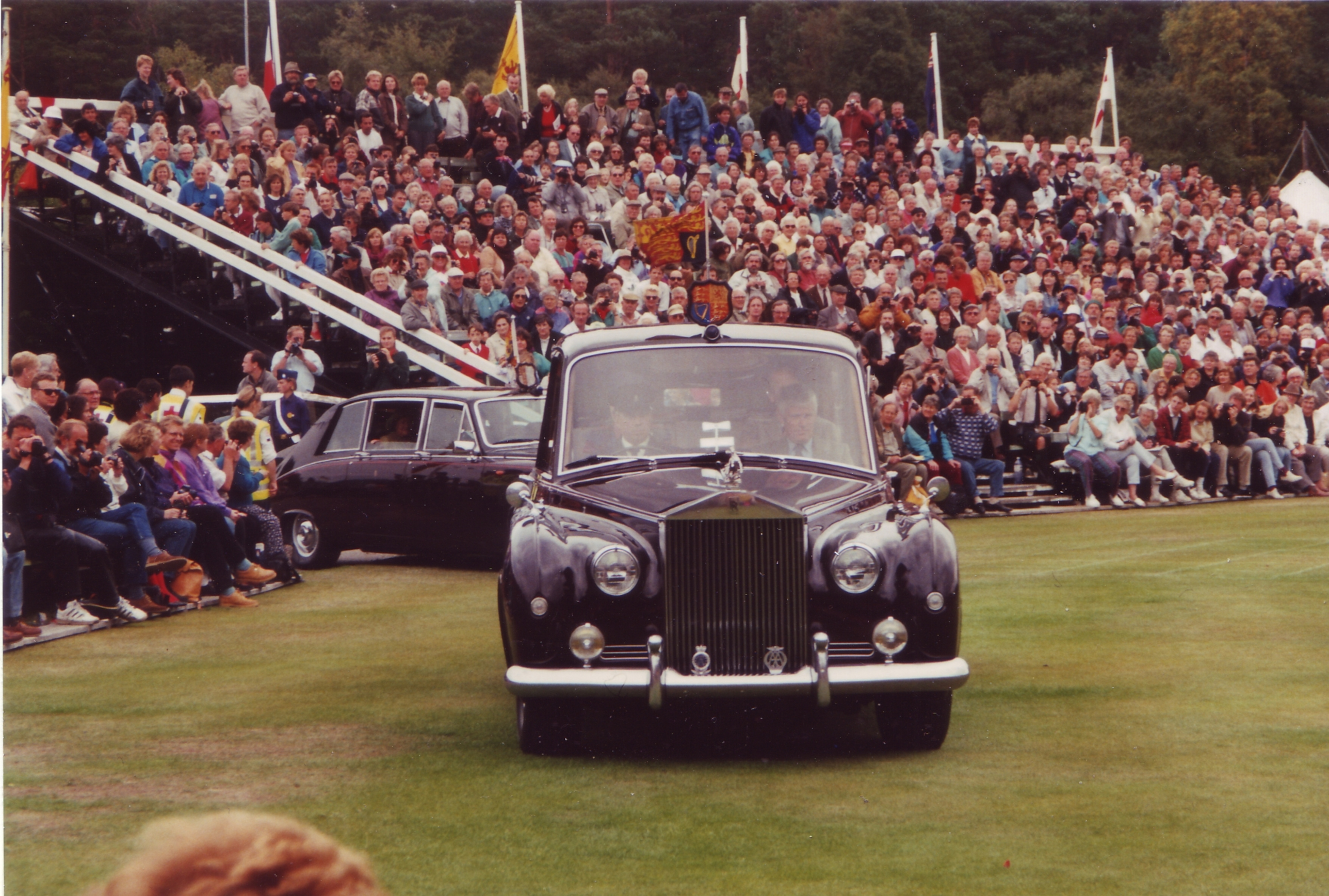
Queen Elizabeth II and Queen Elizabeth the Queen Mother arriving at Braemar in 1994 (in a Rolls-Royce Phantom V and a Daimler DS420 limousine respectively).

The State and Semi-State cars have fittings on the roof for a shield and a flagstaff. When used by the Sovereign, the shield displays the Royal coat of arms of the United Kingdom and Royal Standard is flown (or, where relevant, one of the sovereign's other flags with an appropriate shield may be used). At one time, use of the Standard was limited to 'major function[s] where there are troops, or the Streets are lined, or there is a Guard of Honour to be inspected', and the sovereign's standard signified which car was to be saluted. Since the 1950s the monarch's cars have been provided with back-lit shields which are illuminated at night. Other Coats of Arms and flags are used, depending on the purpose and context of the journey. Some senior members of the Royal Family display their shields; otherwise, a red shield with a crown is displayed if the car is carrying 'another Member of the Royal Family or someone representing the [sovereign]', or is part of a royal procession.

The State and official vehicles are driven by royal chauffeurs, overseen by the Head Chauffeur and (as part of the Royal Mews Department) under the overall supervision of the Crown Equerry. The State Cars are numbered, with cars one and two being normally (but not exclusively) reserved for the use of the monarch. The monarch is always driven by the Head, Deputy Head or Assistant Head Chauffeur; several 'first chauffeurs' are responsible for driving other members of the Royal Family, and general duties are undertaken by the 'second chauffeurs'. The chauffeurs are also responsible for day-to-day care and maintenance of the motor vehicles.

== State and royal cars in the 20th century ==
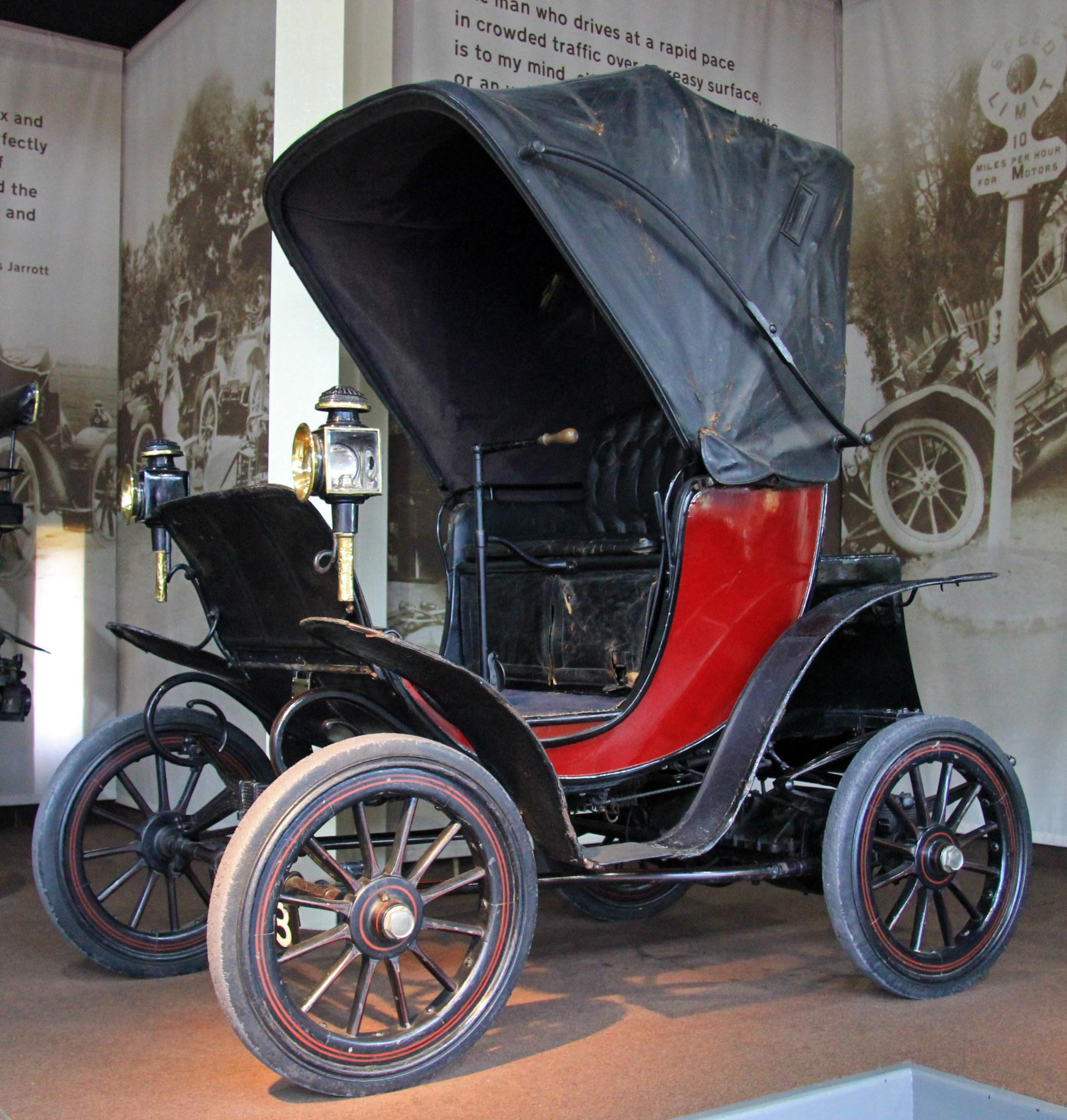
The first electric car in royal ownership was this Columbia, bought by Queen Alexandra in 1901 for use on the Sandringham estate.

The history of royal motor cars in Britain goes back to the very beginning of the last century. At that time the Daimler Motor Company had recently established itself as Britain's first automotive manufacturer.

=== The Daimler era ===
For the first half of the 20th century, Daimlers were invariably chosen as the monarch's state cars (and the company also built vehicles for several other members of the Royal Family). During that period, royal cars were coachbuilt and, as far as the monarch's cars were concerned, Hooper & Co. were almost invariably employed (they already held royal warrants for carriage building dating from as early as 1830).

==== Edward VII ====
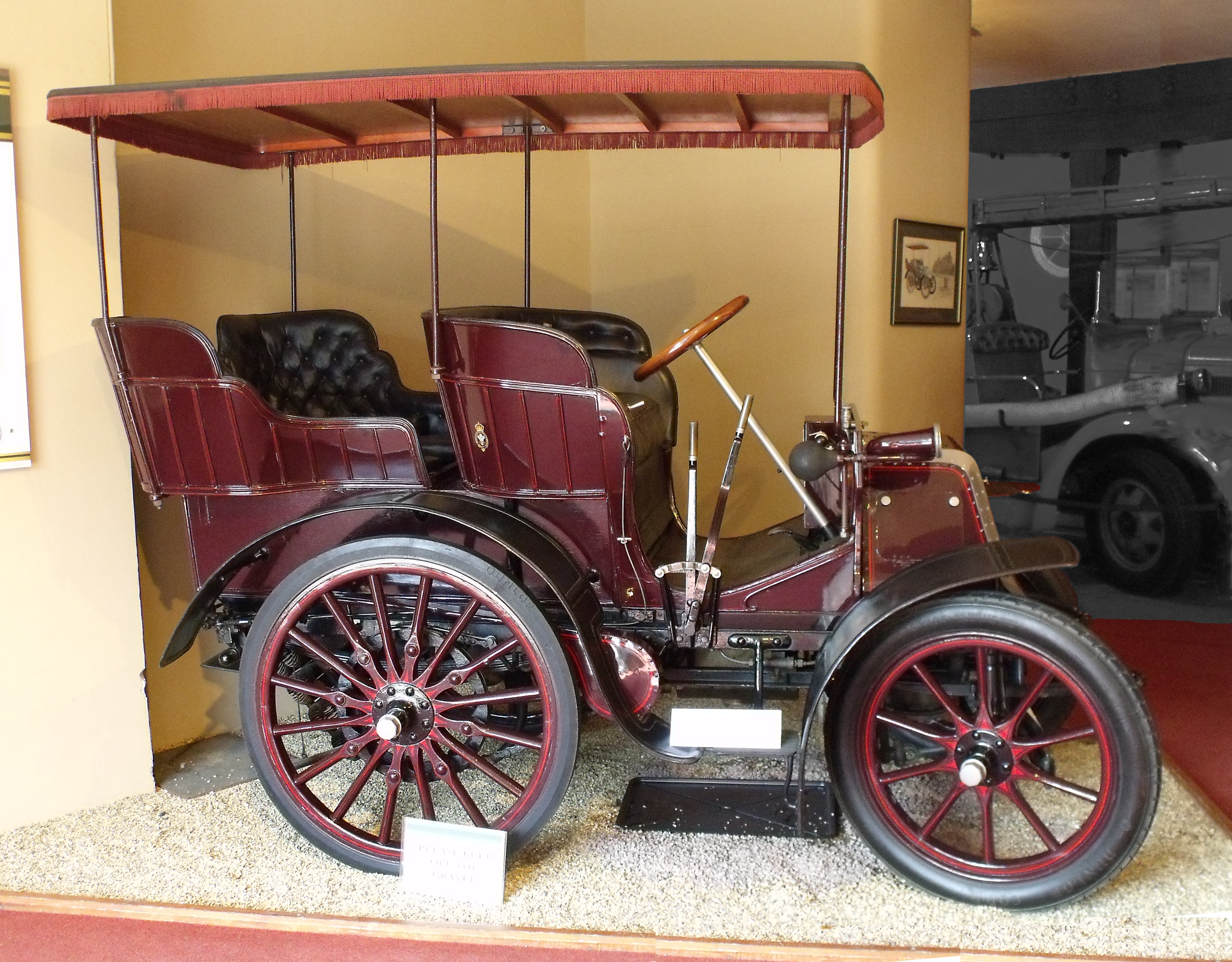
King Edward VII's 1900 six-horsepower Daimler Mail Phaeton, the earliest surviving royal car.

The first royal motorist was King Edward VII, who (when still Prince of Wales) took delivery of his first car, a 6 hp Daimler, in June 1900. Hooper & Co. built the body of the car, which is described as a mail phaeton. The future king continued to be an enthusiastic promoter of the motor car, and that same year he ordered two more vehicles from Daimler: a 12 hp wagonette and a 'beaters' car' (the latter with seating for up to fourteen passengers).

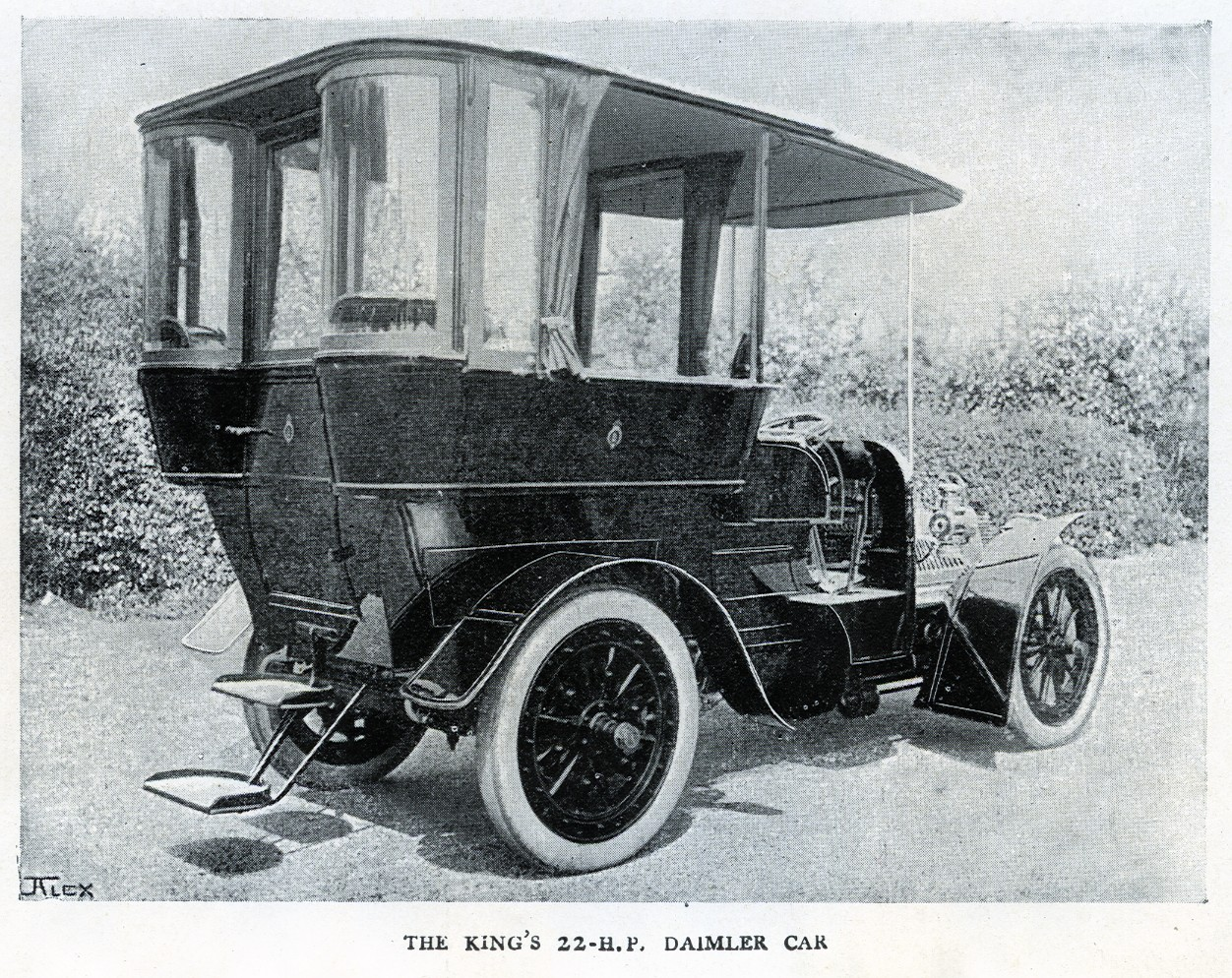
The King's 22-H.P. Daimler 'Touring Carriage', pictured in 1904.

Following his accession to the throne in 1901, he awarded Daimler his royal warrant, converted part of the Royal Mews into a garage for the motor cars and ordered another new Daimler: a 22 hp 'touring carriage' painted in 'dark claret with fine red lines'. The King used his motor cars for travelling (both in the UK and on mainland Europe) and on other appropriate occasions, but they did not entirely displace horse-drawn transport; indeed, in 1904 the King issued a directive to make it clear that 'electric broughams and motor carriages should not be used for taking members of the Royal family or their suites to Court or other State ceremonies at the Palace'. The first time a motor car was used by the King for an official engagement was on 19 October 1904, when he was driven to and from Woolwich Garrison in a 28-36 hp Daimler with a limousine body, acquired a few month earlier.

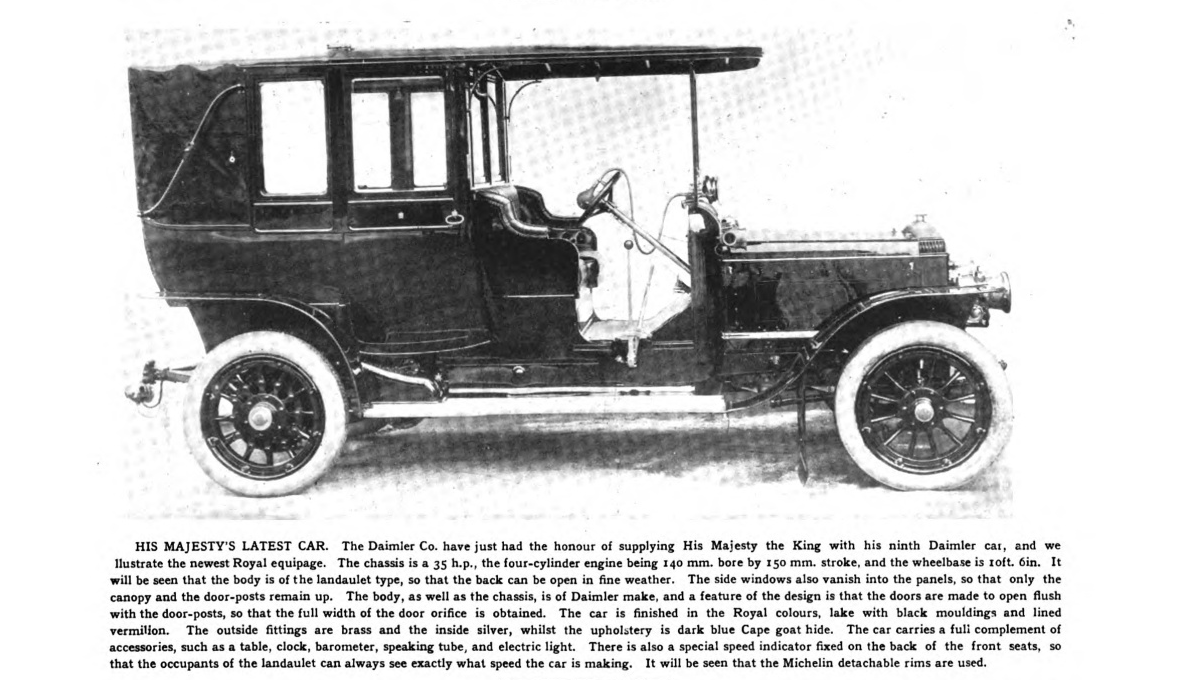
Edward VII's ninth Daimler car, as described in The Autocar (1907).

The Prince of Wales (the future King George V) had purchased an electric car in 1902, and a Daimler the following year (the first of many that he would acquire over the ensuing years). The Princess of Wales (the future Queen Mary) acquired her first Daimler in 1905, opting for a Mulliner-built body (Mulliner remained her coachbuilder of choice up until the accession of her husband five years later). She had the car painted a shade of green taken from the foliage of a fir tree in the grounds of York Cottage, a colour which she continued to use for her personal cars up to and including her last (a 1947 Daimler DE 27).

Edward VII died in 1910. Over the course of the preceding decade he had owned ten Daimlers in total, having upgraded his fleet every few years in line with technological advances. During the same period of time he had acquired other cars for private use: three Mercedes, and a Renault landaulette (bought for the Queen); but on official occasions he had always used a Daimler. One of these, a 1907 shooting brake, was given a registration plate (LD 4352) after the king's death and retained by his widow Queen Alexandra until she died in 1925. She also regularly used a 1910 57 hp Landaulette (registered LB 7078) on official and public occasions, which the late King had ordered but hadn't lived to see delivered (she remained very fond of this car and transferred its body to a brand new chassis in 1923).

==== George V ====
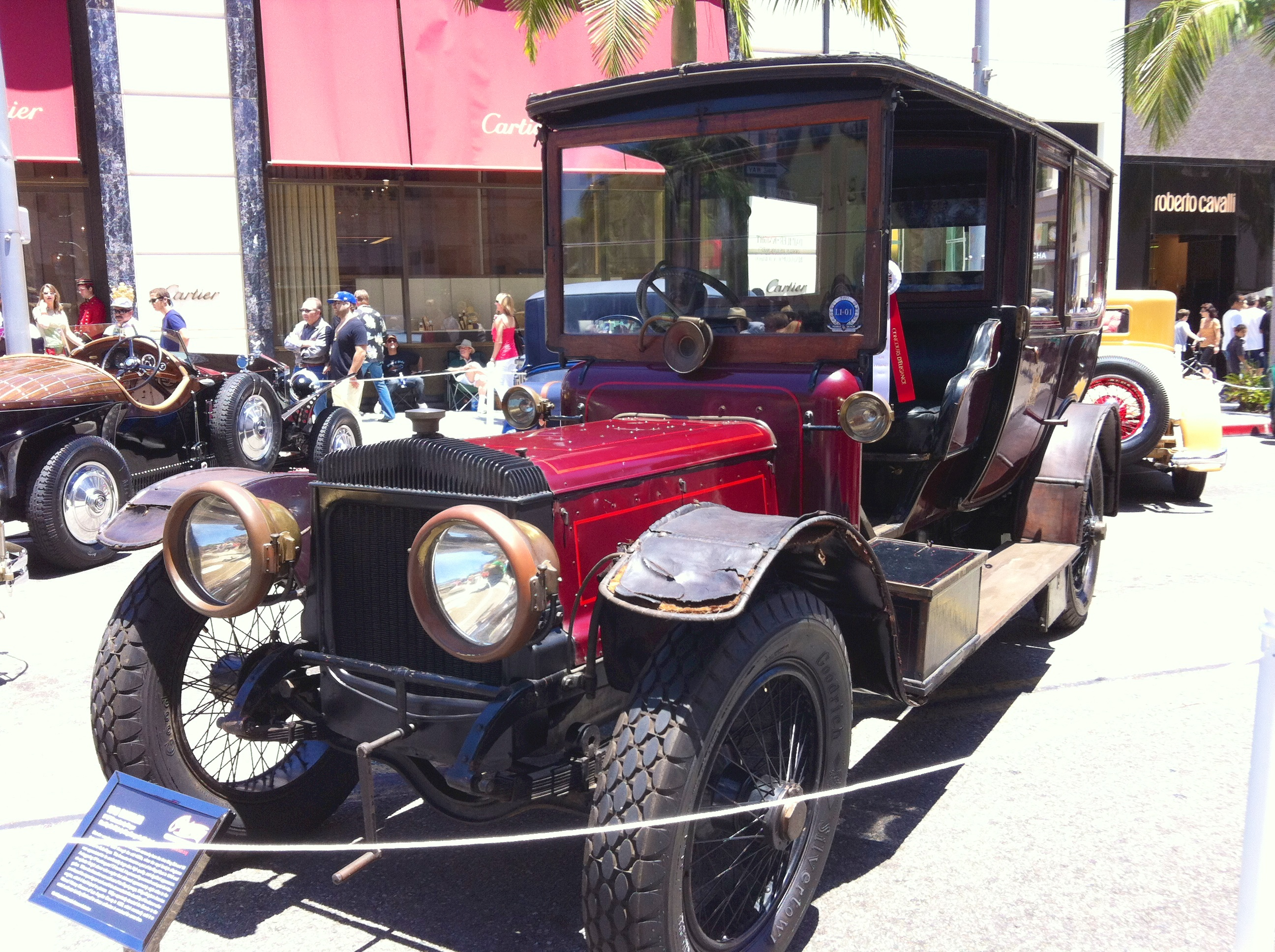
Daimler 57 hp Straight-Six former State Limousine, acquired by the King in 1910 and sold in 1924.

By the time of his coronation, King George V had a working fleet of four cars kept at the Royal Mews, according to a contemporary report, along with a shooting brake and a lorry. The full fleet of cars stayed with the King at whichever royal residence he was using, usually being driven on the road to Windsor and Sandringham, but transported by rail to Balmoral. As Prince of Wales, George V had acquired an early sleeve valve Daimler in 1909: a 38 hp straight four limousine, and Queen Mary acquired a similar car the following year (which was painted dark green and used for private journeys); but the principal pre-war limousines were a pair of 57 hp straight-six-engined cars, which had a long wheelbase and seating for up to six passengers. In these (and subsequent) cars, King George and Queen Mary habitually occupied the middle pair of bucket seats on official occasions, so as to be better seen by onlookers as the car passed, while their equerries and ladies in waiting sat to the rear.

Whether for official or personal use, these cars were almost invariably chauffeur-driven. In 1913, the King, responding to a question from a journalist, said that while he knew how to drive, he never drove in public (but sometimes drove cars on his private estates, at Sandringham and Balmoral). His wife Queen Mary was never known to drive herself.

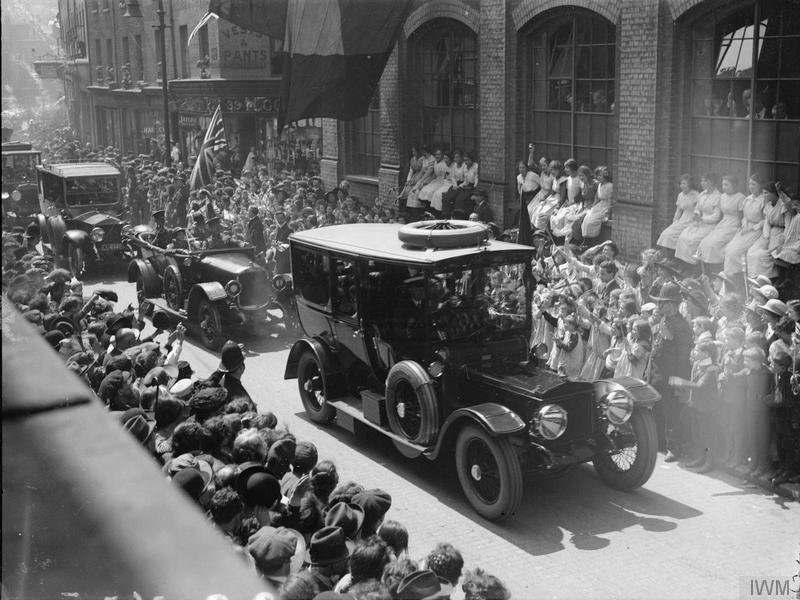
The King and Queen travelling in one of the 1910 57 hp limousines towards the end of the First World War.

By the start of the First World War a number of conventions had emerged with regard to royal cars, several of which remain in place, including:

- the use of 'claret' livery for the royal cars
- the painting of a royal crest or badge on two or more door panels
- the use of a distinctive personal 'mascot' on the radiator cap (beginning with a figure of Britannia, given to George V on the occasion of his coronation)
- from 1911 the display of the royal arms on a shield and/or flag to improve recognition
- increased headroom (George V stipulated 60 inches from floor to ceiling), to make access easier for those wearing headwear (specifically 'a field marshal's hat with plume')
- the provision of interior electric lighting
- the convention that vehicles used personally by the monarch carried no registration plates (this latter exception did not extend to all vehicles owned by the monarch, only to those used by him personally).

Later in the King's reign, the distinction between State vehicles and the monarch's personal vehicles was made clearer, with the latter no longer being exempted from registration.

Up until the Second World War, State cars were given the additional distinguishing feature of a black-painted radiator grille (in preference to the usual chrome or bright finish). From 1923, the King's vehicles were fitted with a blue light, 'placed in the centre over the driver's canopy' to signal the King's presence by night.

On large State occasions (and for some less formal gatherings), additional cars were required; these were often provided by hire firms, including Daimler Hire Ltd in London and Rossleigh Ltd in Edinburgh.

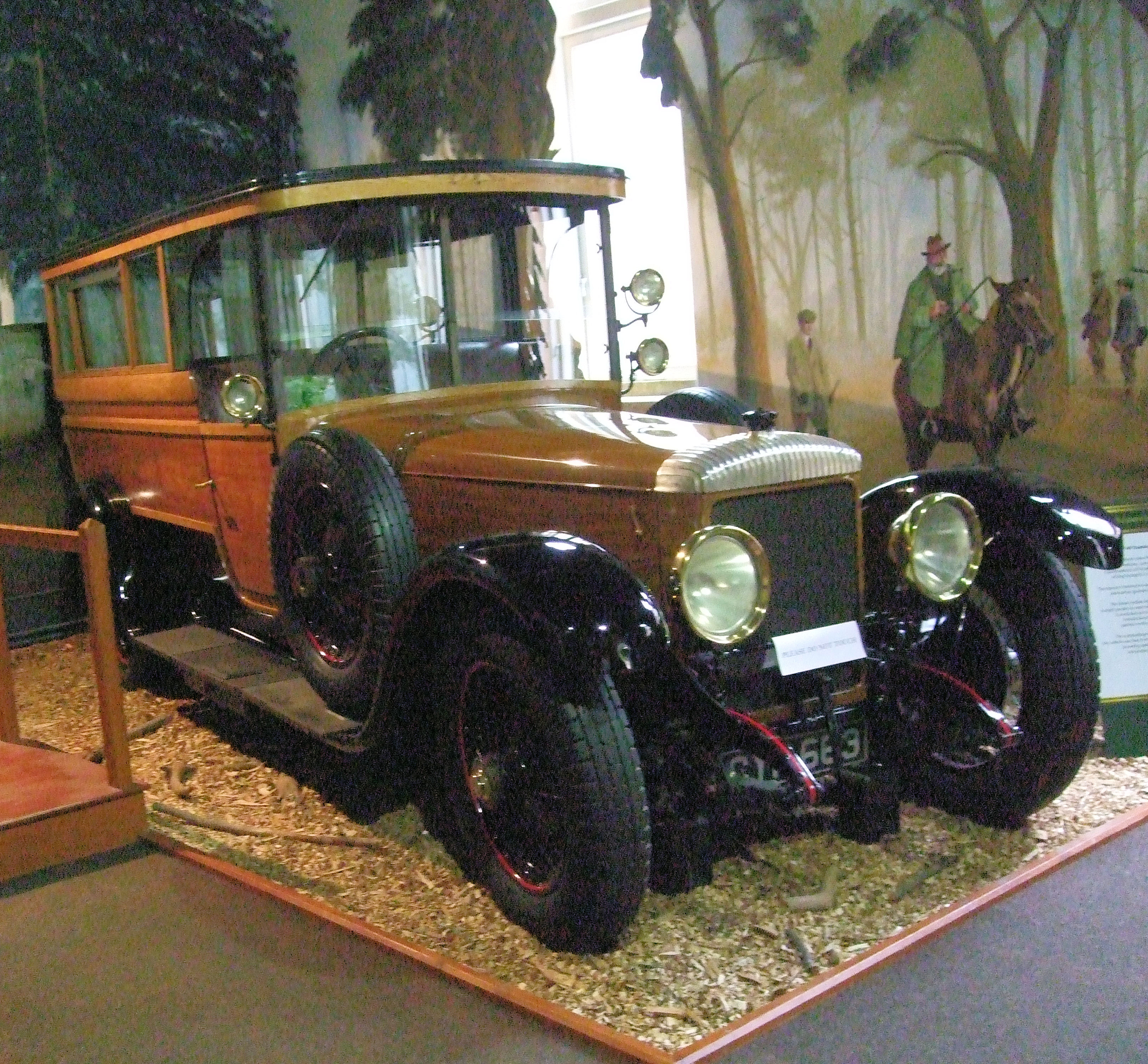
One of George V's 1924 57 hp Daimler Shooting Brakes (later used by Queen Mary) now at Sandringham.

By 1924, the monarch's cars had been in 'constant service for upwards of 14 years' and a new set of Daimlers were ordered through Stratton-Instone (which had recently taken over Daimler's London showrooms): two limousines and two shooting brakes, all with the most up-to-date 57 hp straight-six engine. The following year Queen Mary had a new limousine delivered, with Hooper bodywork like the King's new cars but on a shorter ('45 hp') chassis.

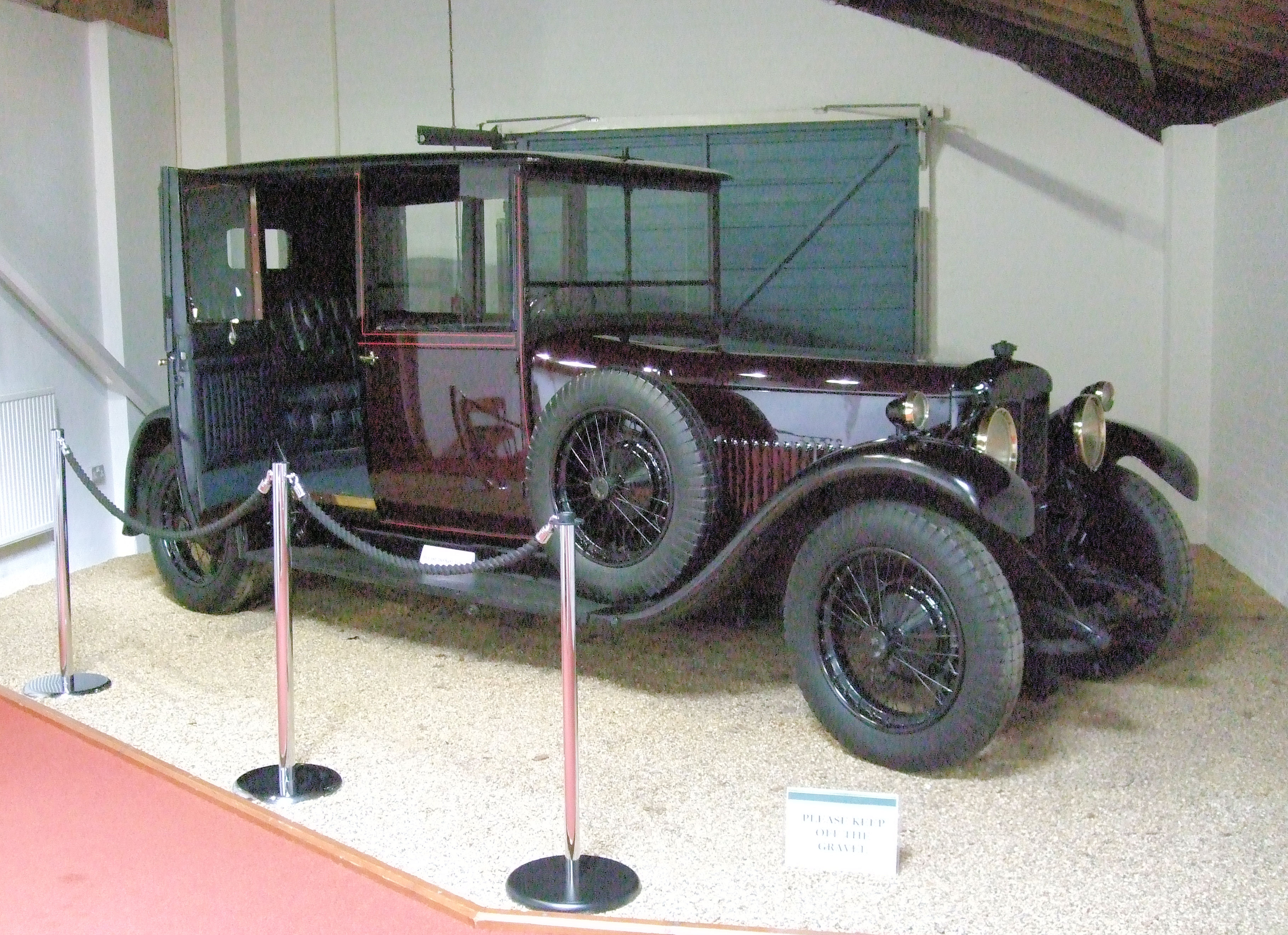
George V's 1929 Daimler Double-Six 30 Brougham, at the Royal Motor Museum, Sandringham.

In 1926, the much-vaunted Daimler Double-Six sleeve-valve V12 engine was launched; the following year the King gave instructions for the two State limousines to have their straight-six engines removed and Double-Six '50' engines fitted. In November Queen Mary went a step further and traded in a 1913 45 hp car for a brand new Hooper-bodied Double-Six '30' (which, like its predecessor, was for private use: green-painted and decorated with her personal monogram). Two years later the King acquired his own Double-Six '30': a Brougham in royal claret (the term 'Brougham' indicated a car for private use, without the middle row of seats.) At the time, he was convalescing from illness and acquired in addition a six-wheel open-roof Crossley to enable him to resume shooting; it had coachwork by Barker & Co., was painted in royal claret and upholstered with waterproof blue leather.

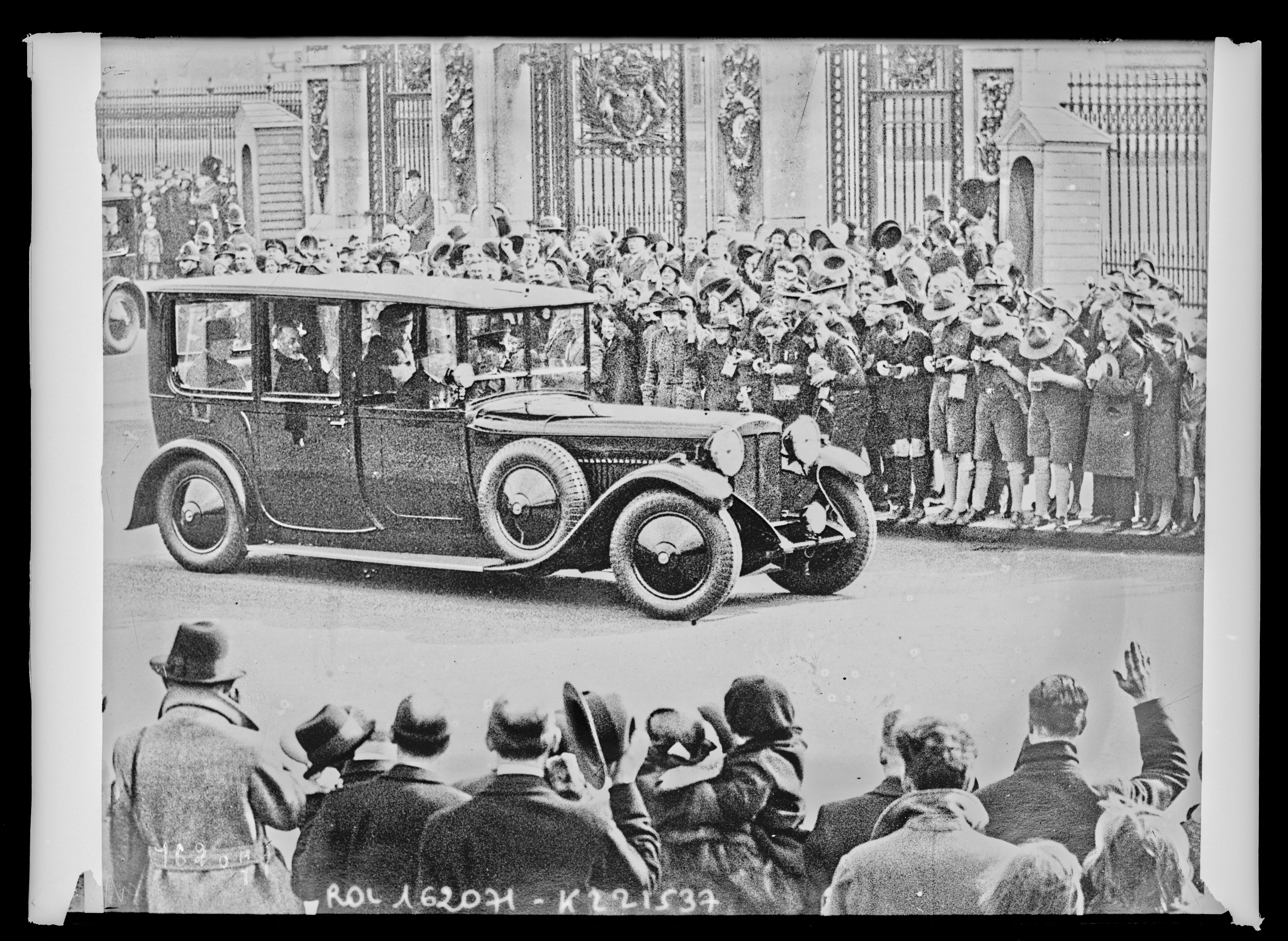
George V and Queen Mary in one of the 1931 Daimler state limousines, in 1932.

In October 1930, in the midst of the Great Depression, it was announced that the King and Queen had placed an order for no fewer than five new Double-Six Daimlers as part of their desire 'to stimulate British industry, which is passing through difficult times' and to 'help unemployment during the winter months'. Delivered six months later were three 40-50 hp limousines (two to replace the 1924 No.1 and No.2 State Cars, one for the use of the Queen) and two 30-40 hp 'enclosed limousines', one for the King, the other (painted green) for the Queen. All five were fitted with Daimler's cutting-edge new fluid flywheel transmission system; the following year the two 1924 Shooting Brakes were retrofitted with the same assemblies. In 1934 one of the new limousines was used for the first time to convey the monarch to the State Opening of Parliament, excessive fog preventing the customary use of the Gold State Coach on this occasion.

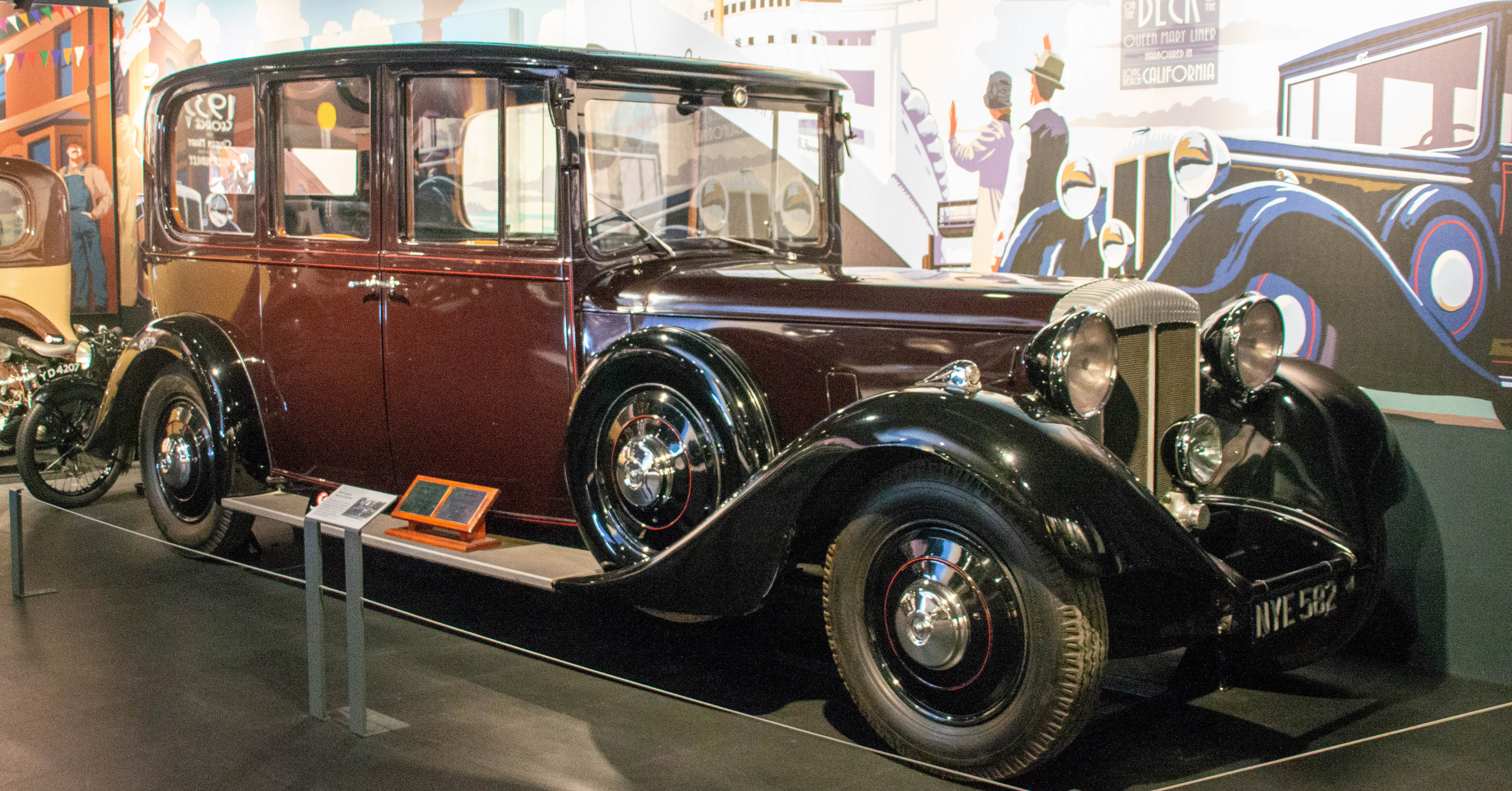
Queen Mary's 1935 Daimler Double-Six Limousine, used by her up until her death in 1953; now in the Coventry Transport Museum.

In April 1935, to mark the King's Silver Jubilee, a new State Car, a bespoke Double-Six 40/50 hp Enclosed Limousine, was purchased for the King. A few months later a virtually identical car was purchased for the Queen; this replaced her 1931 40-50 hp limousine, and she transferred her number plate (XE 7432) to the new car from the old.

Six months later, King George V died. The Mews at that time is said to have housed ten Daimlers: five State limousines, the King's 'private Brougham', the Queen's two cars (her limousine and her personal car) and a pair of 'Household cars'. George V was succeeded by his eldest son, who assumed the regnal name Edward VIII.

==== Edward VIII ====
Edward, as Prince of Wales, had driven a variety of cars, from Rolls-Royce Phantoms to a streamlined Burney. As well as inheriting his father's Silver Jubilee Car, which retained its position as No.1 State Limousine, he introduced a Humber Pullman into the Royal Mews. He also took delivery of a new 32 hp 4 1/2-litre Daimler Straight-Eight limousine, to serve as his No.2 State Car; (it was bought in part-exchange for the late King's 1931 30-40 hp limousine). In addition, two Household cars and a Leyland Lioness lorry were retained. For private use he owned two Buicks and he also brought in a pair of Ford 'station vans'. One of the 1931 40-50 hp limousines was transferred to Queen Mary, along with one of the 1924 Shooting Brakes (which was registered CYF 663); other vehicles were disposed of.

For a second time, a State Daimler conveyed a King to the State Opening of Parliament, in November 1936, when Edward cancelled the carriage procession on account of heavy rain; a month later he was no longer King, and the accession of his brother was proclaimed.

==== George VI ====
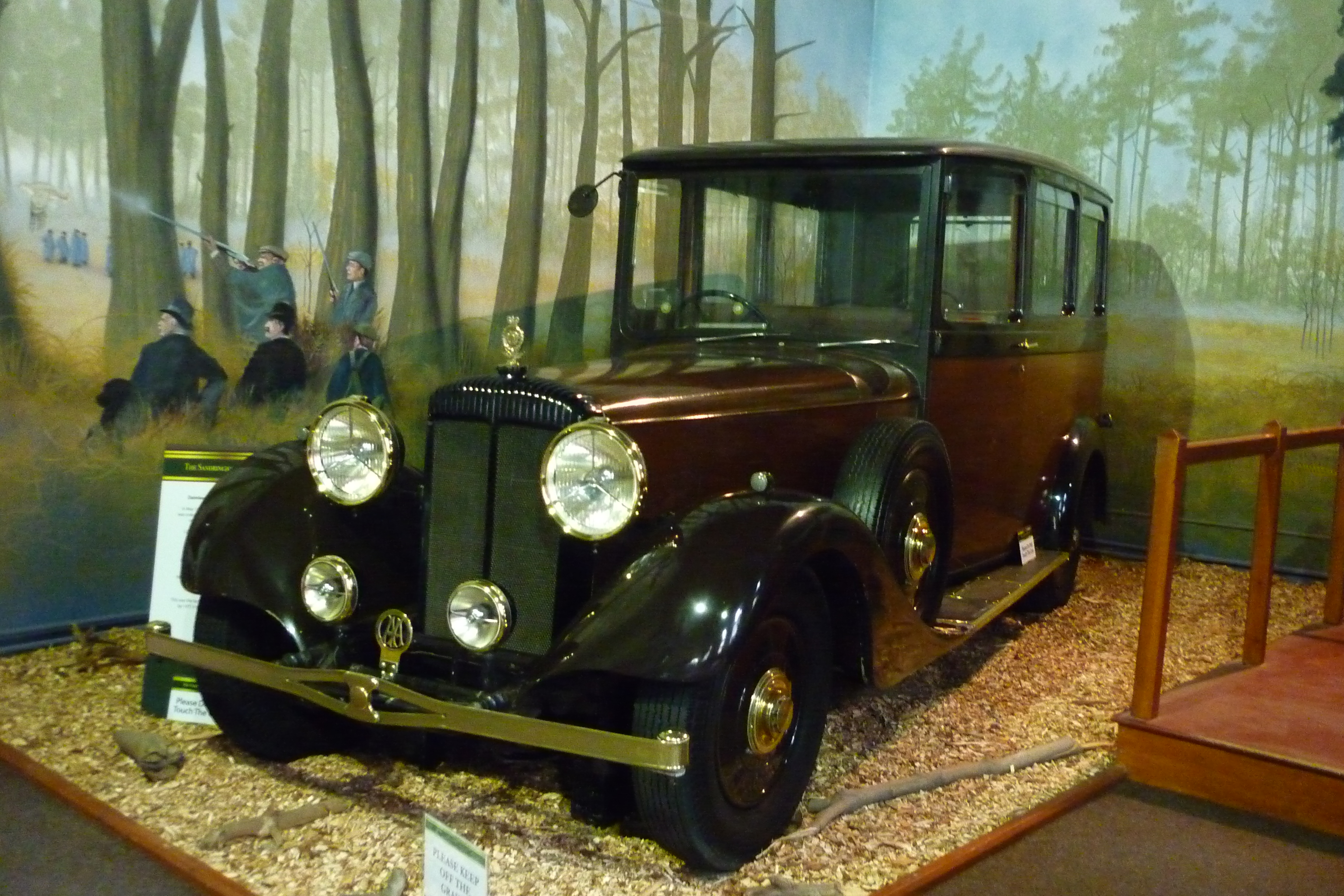
George VI's 1937 Daimler V-4 Litre Shooting Brake at the Sandringham Royal Motor Museum.

King George VI was an aficionado of Lanchester cars. He had purchased a number in the 1920s and in the '30s, by which time the cars were being manufactured at the Daimler factory (the Lanchester Motor Company having been taken over by Daimler's parent company, BSA, in 1931). Before his father's death, he had placed an order for two straight-eight Daimlers, to be badged as Lanchesters: a limousine and a landaulette. Delivered in February 1936 (painted black and with registration plates JJ 4 and JJ 5), these were envisaged as formal vehicles for him as Duke of York; (he also took delivery of a car for personal use, a blue Lanchester 'Eighteen'). When he became King, the Lanchesters came with him to the Mews; but they retained their colour and plates and were used for informal occasions.

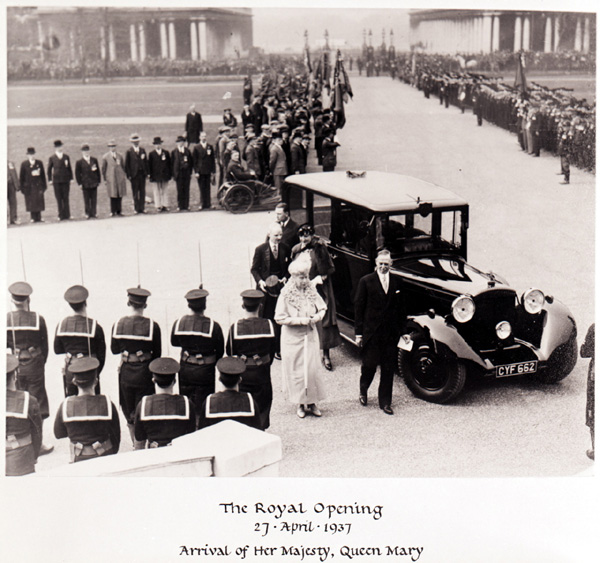
Queen Mary in 1937, making use of her late husband's Silver Jubilee car.

In the year of his coronation (1937), three new Daimler State cars were delivered to the King: a limousine, a landaulette and a shooting brake (all with 32 hp 4 1/2-litre straight-eight engines). His mother Queen Mary also upgraded her fleet, acquiring two new cars: one for official use (a 32 hp 'Straight-Eight' limousine, which inherited her longstanding registration plate A 3179), and one for personal use (a 24 hp six-cylinder limousine, painted green). She also continued to make use of her 1935 limousine, and furthermore, inherited her late husband's Silver Jubilee car (which was given the number plate CYF 662) and with it 'Humphrey', his long-serving erstwhile chauffeur. Two years later, Queen Mary was injured when her 1937 official limousine was involved in a collision with a lorry, leaving the car overturned.

Before the outbreak of war, in February 1939, the King took delivery of another 4 1/2-litre Straight-Eight landaulette; at His Majesty's own suggestion it had been fitted with a triplex glass roof panel to enable the King and Queen to be more clearly seen (an innovation which became standard on subsequent state cars). The 1937 landaulette was then given over to the Queen's use (though it was not separately registered). The following month a black Daimler DB18 2 1/2-litre Coupe was acquired, for the King's personal use. Also in 1939, arrangements were made for the King's Lanchester landaulette and limousine to be replaced; both were exchanged for new models (which were again badged as Lanchesters, painted black like their predecessors and given number plates). By the time the second Lanchester was delivered the war was well underway, and the Palace made it clear that no further cars were to be commissioned while the conflict endured.

In September 1940, a number of cars were damaged during an air raid, when an anti-aircraft shell landed near the garage at the Mews. In 1941 it was decided by the War Office to provide the King with a pair of armoured Daimler limousines; the specially-constructed bodies were, as ever, built by Hooper. They remained the property of the War Office, and were registered as such.

At the end of the war, the Royal Mews contained no fewer than seven 32 hp 4 1/2-litre Straight-Eight cars: one dating from 1936, two from 1937, one from 1939, the two Lanchesters, and the 1937 Shooting Brake (which was normally kept at Windsor Castle). There were also the King's personal cars (the Daimler coupe and the Lanchester 'Eighteen'), two 'Household' cars, three Ford utility vans, and a Leyland Cub van. To supplement the official cars owned by the King and other members of the Royal Family, the Daimler Company retained its own 'Royal Stock' of cars which were routinely loaned to the Mews when needed for large official occasions or to cover events across different locations.

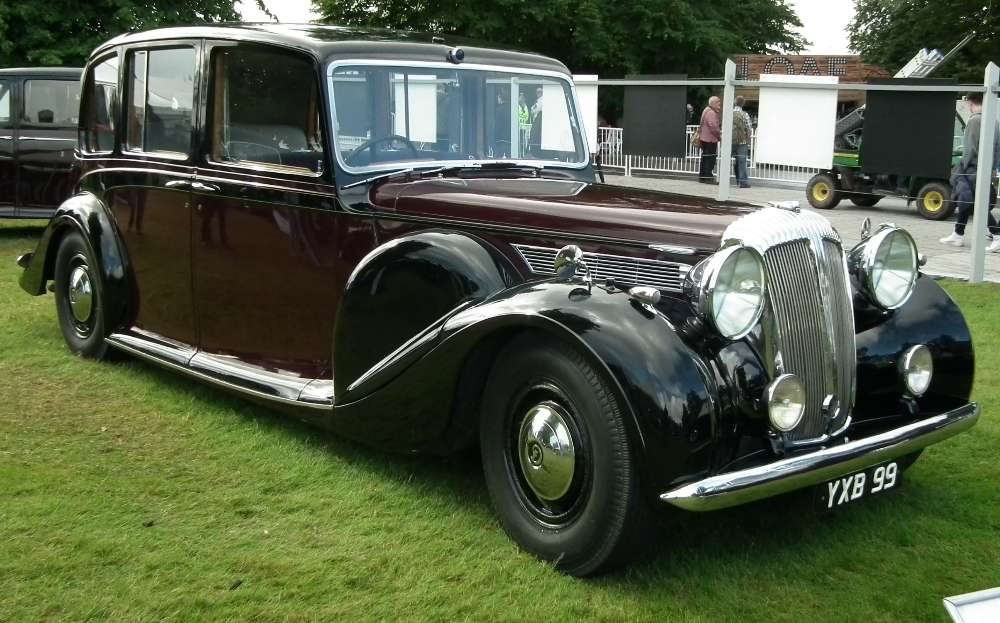
One of George VI's 1947 Daimler DE36 former State Landaulettes (now at the Coventry Transport Museum).

A process of replacement and renewal began after the war. In 1946, two new Daimler DE 36 Straight-Eight State Landaulettes were ordered to serve as the No.1 and No.2 State Cars; they were delivered the following year. In 1949, two more DE 36 State Landaulettes, almost identical in design, were acquired (replacing the 1937 and 1939 landaulettes, which were taken in part-exchange). These then became the new No.1 and No.2 State Cars, and the 1947 models were relegated to No.3 and No.4. Throughout his reign, the King had a preference for the landaulette car body style: unlike his parents, he and the Queen always sat in the rear seats on public occasions and lowering the hood enabled them to be seen.

The new State Daimlers were similar in many respects to five 'Straight-Eight' cars which had been purchased by the government of South Africa and used by the King and Queen on their 1947 royal tour there. In 1948, no fewer than twelve new Daimler limousines had been purchased by the governments of Australia and New Zealand in preparation for their royal tour scheduled for Spring 1949; but as the scheduled departure date drew near the King's health grew worse and the tour was cancelled. He died in 1952. The cars were retained, however, and would later be used by the King's daughter Elizabeth, who would tour New Zealand and Australia as Queen in 1953-54, accompanied by the Duke of Edinburgh.

=== The Rolls-Royce era ===
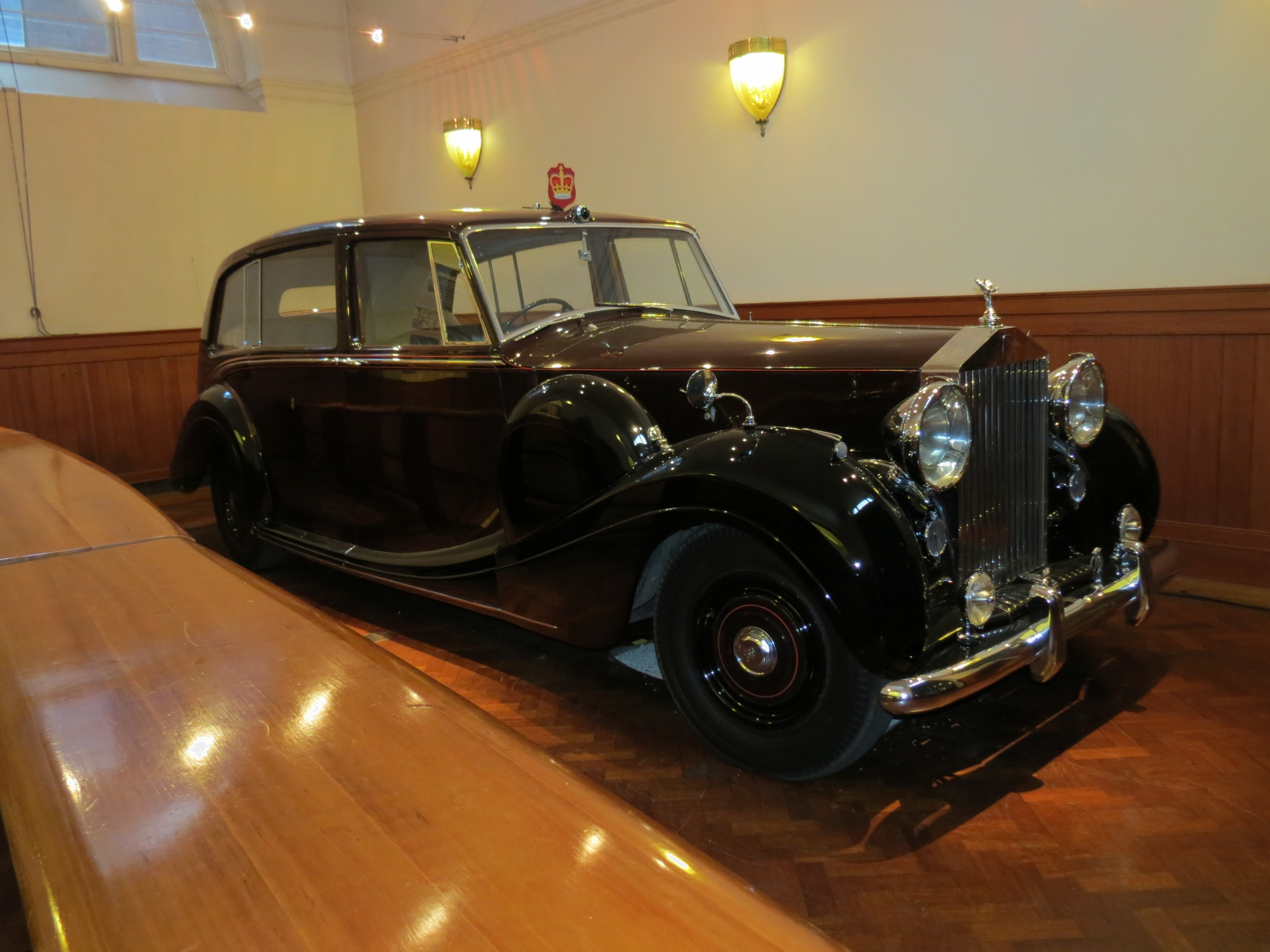
Rolls-Royce Phantom IV acquired by Princess Elizabeth and the Duke of Edinburgh in 1950, in the Royal Mews.

In 1948, Princess Elizabeth (the future Queen) and her husband the Duke of Edinburgh were presented with a Daimler DE 27 limousine as a belated wedding present by the RAF and WAAF. It was envisaged that this car (which was registered HRH 1) would serve the needs of the Princess and her husband as their formal duties increased; but the following year, on a visit to the new Rolls-Royce factory in Crewe, the Duke's attention was caught by an experimental vehicle with a straight-eight Bentley engine, known as the 'scalded cat'. Further enquiries from the Duke led to the development of what would become the first Rolls-Royce Phantom IV: in 1950 he and the Princess took delivery of this car, which was a dark green-painted Mulliner-bodied limousine, registered LGO 10. This purchase marked the start of a shift from Daimler to Rolls-Royce as the preferred manufacturer of formal royal vehicles. With the arrival of the Rolls-Royce Phantom, the 'HRH 1' Daimler limousine was sold.

==== Elizabeth II ====
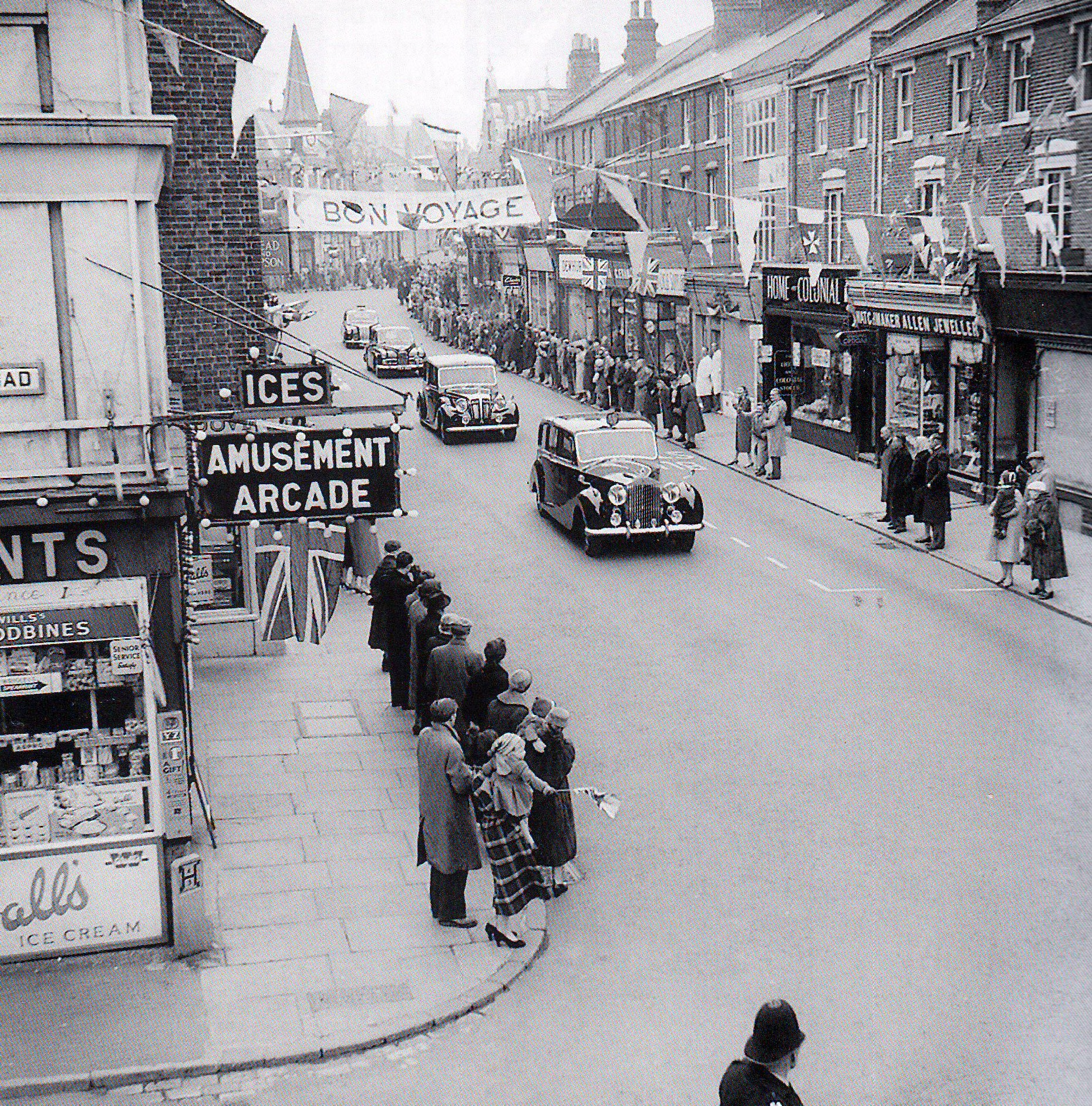
Rolls-Royce leads the way (1958): the Phantom IV state landaulette, carrying the Queen, with a Daimler state car following it.

When Elizabeth II came to the throne in 1952, she inherited four state cars: namely the two pairs of near-identical Daimler DE 36 state landaulettes (which had been acquired by her father, King George VI, in 1947 and 1949). She and the Duke of Edinburgh, however, already owned the 1950 Rolls-Royce Phantom IV limousine and it was resolved that this should now become her No.1 State Car; it was therefore repainted in royal claret and black and had its number plates removed, ready to be used for the first time in its new guise on Maundy Thursday, 10 April 1952. (As of 2021, the 1950 Phantom IV remains in regular use as one of the Queen's State cars.)

Alongside the Phantom IV, three of the Daimler landaulettes were retained as State Cars; the fourth was transferred to Queen Elizabeth the Queen Mother in 1952 (and duly provided with a number plate: NLT 2). At the same time she was given the two 1939 Lanchesters to serve as her secondary vehicles. The Queen Mother also made regular use at this time of a Daimler 'Royal Stock' DE 36 Straight-Eight landaulette, which she went on to purchase in 1954 (having sold the Lanchester limousine); it was duly re-registered (as NLT 6), decorated with her royal monogram, and served as her 'No.2 Royal Landaulette' through the rest of the decade.

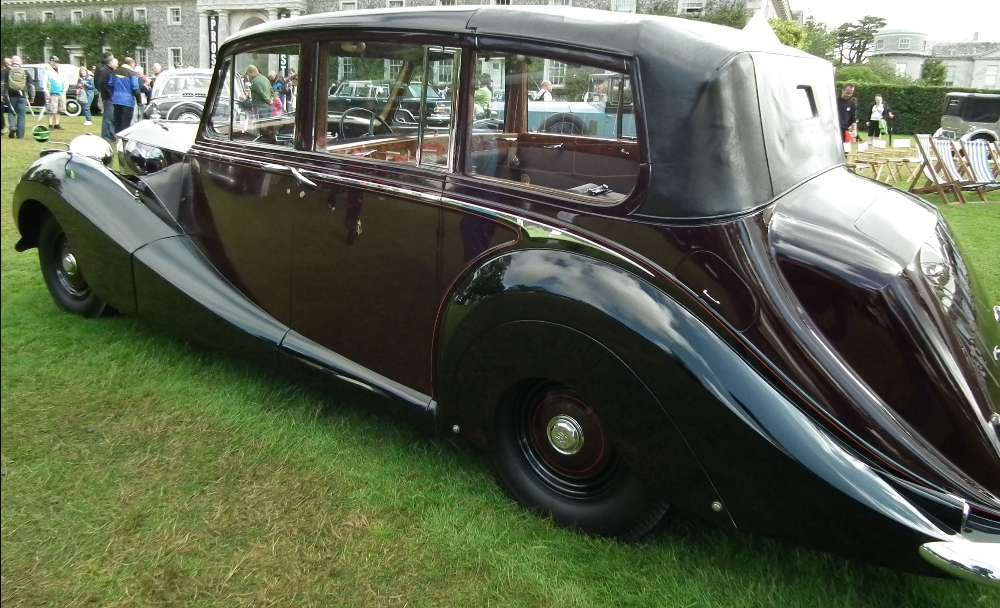
The retired 1954 Rolls-Royce Phantom IV state landaulette, at an event in 2012 to mark the Queen's jubilee.

In the mid-1950s, potential state cars were built speculatively: one by Rolls-Royce (a 1954 Hooper-bodied Phantom IV landaulette) and two by Daimler (1955 Hooper-bodied DK 400s: one limousine, one landaulette). Each company discreetly made it known that these vehicles were being kept available for the Queen and the Duke of Edinburgh to use at any time; indeed, in 1955 the Phantom IV landaulette was pressed into service on no less an occasion than the State Opening of Parliament, when it conveyed the Queen and the Duke to the Palace of Westminster and back (the customary carriage procession having been cancelled due to a rail strike). The landaulette at this time was registered OXR 2, but its number plates were detachable (and whenever it functioned as a state car they were removed). During construction, care had been taken to ensure that the Phantom IV landaulette would fit inside the garage on board the new Royal Yacht, Britannia, and it went on to be used for several tours overseas, including to Nigeria in 1956, and France and Denmark in 1957.

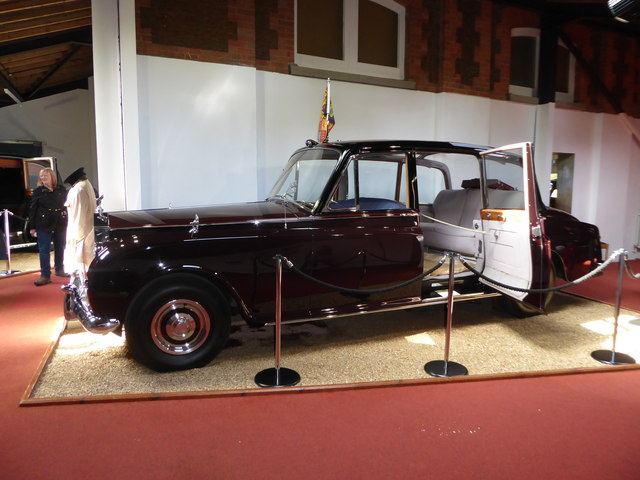
1961 Rolls-Royce Phantom V State Limousine, in use as a State Car from 1961 to 2002, at Sandringham.

By the end of the decade the decision had been taken to sell the three Daimler state landaulettes. In their place the 1954 Rolls-Royce Phantom IV landaulette was purchased in 1959; but the 1955 Daimler DK400s were not. Instead, an order was placed for two new Rolls-Royce Phantom V limousines (with the in-house firm of Park Ward providing the coachwork); these were duly delivered in 1960 and 1961. A novel design feature of these cars was their removeable rear covering, beneath which the roof was made of Perspex (allowing the occupants to be seen more clearly). They were also provided with power steering, and with full air conditioning systems, which led to their supplanting the landaulette as vehicles of choice for overseas tours (though the cars' dimensions were such that their bumpers had to be demounted whenever they were embarked aboard Britannia). As such, one or other of the Phantom Vs travelled with the Queen to Italy in 1961, and to Australia and Fiji in 1963. The Phantom Vs would remain in regular service for over forty years, initially as the No.1 and No.2 State Cars, and then (from 1978) as the No.2 and No.3 State Cars.

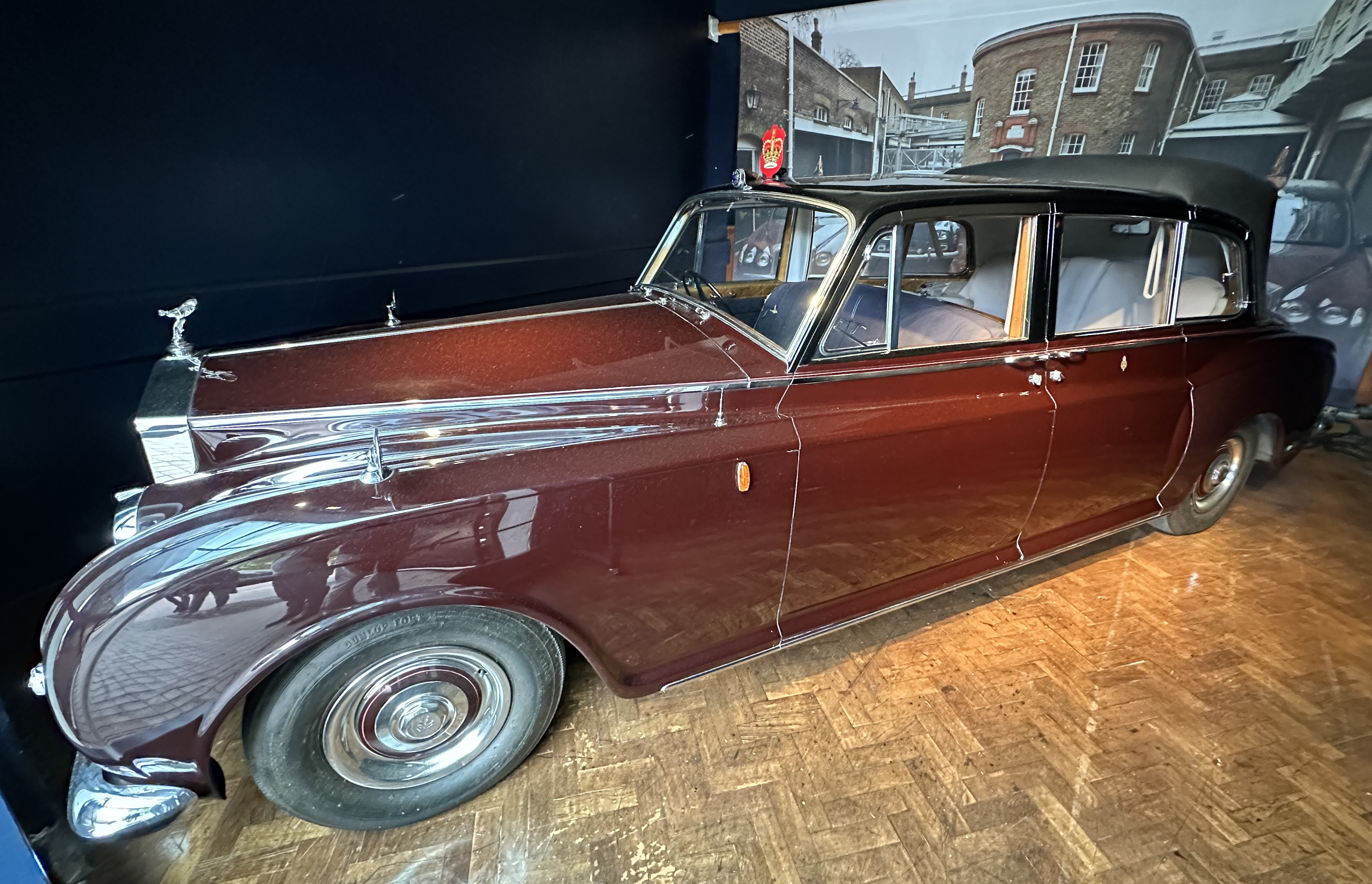
The late Queen Mother's 1962 Rolls-Royce Phantom V Landaulette (NLT 1).

For the last four decades of the twentieth century the State Cars were all Rolls-Royce Phantoms. In 1962 the Queen Mother likewise purchased a Rolls-Royce Phantom V (a landaulette in the royal colours) to serve as her No.1 official car (registered NLT 6, later NLT 1), which she continued to use until she died in 2002. In 1970 she bought the first of a series of Daimler DS420 limousines (each one painted 'claret and black' and registered NLT 2) which served through the rest of her life as her No.2 car: conveying her suite on more formal occasions, and used as her main car for less formal engagements.

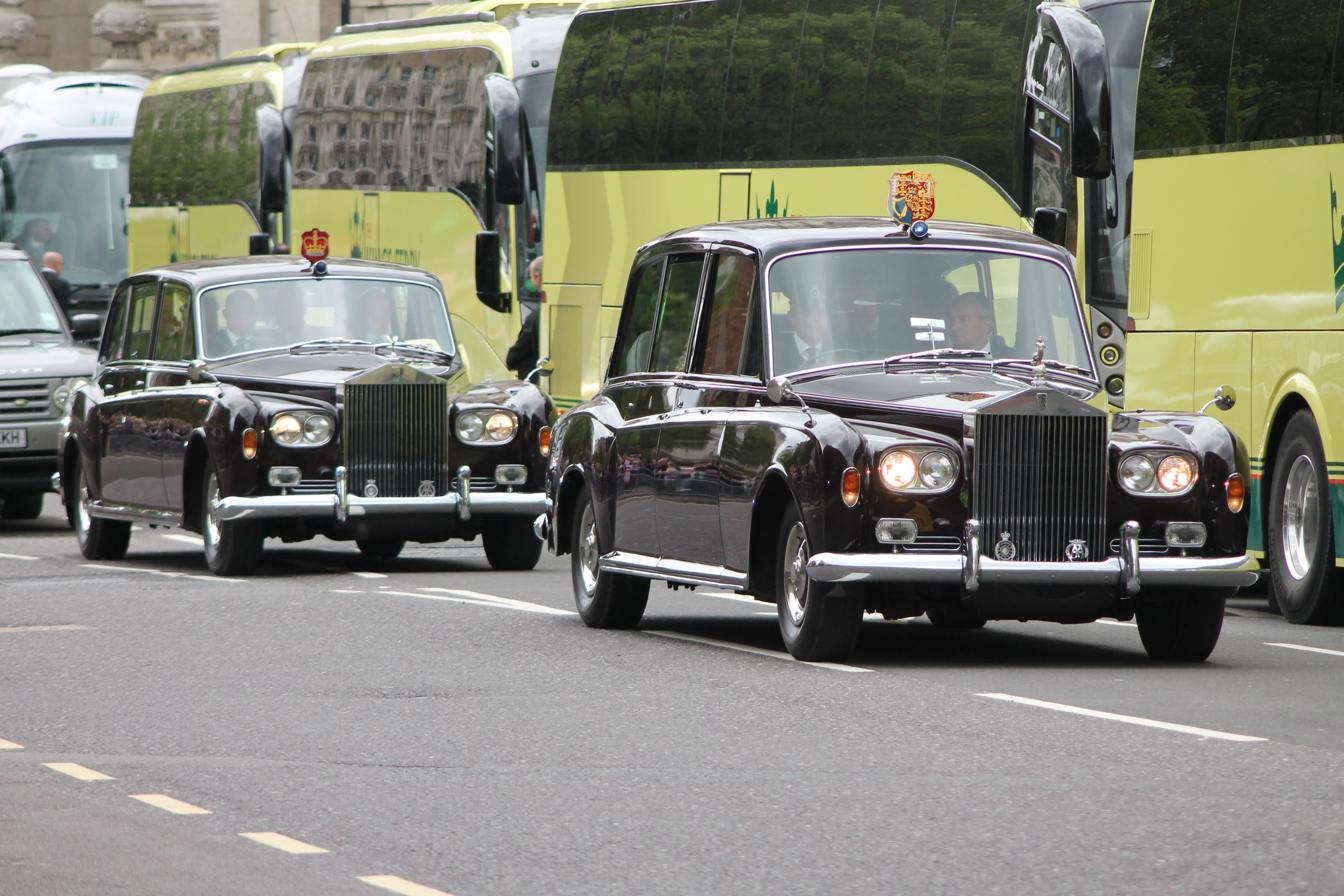
The Rolls-Royce Phantom VI State cars, dating from 1987 (left) and 1978.

In March 1978 the Society of Motor Manufacturers and Traders presented the Queen with a new car to mark her Silver Jubilee: a bespoke Rolls-Royce Phantom VI limousine, with a raised roof for enhanced visibility. It served as her No.1 State Car from 1978 until 2002, and remains part of the working fleet as of 2021.

In 1987, a second Phantom VI state limousine was purchased (a standard model to serve as No.4 State Car). At the same time the 1954 Phantom IV State Landaulette was retired from the working fleet and put on display in the royal motor museum at Sandringham House; by that time it had just under 130,000 miles (210,000 km) on the clock.

=== Other official vehicles ===
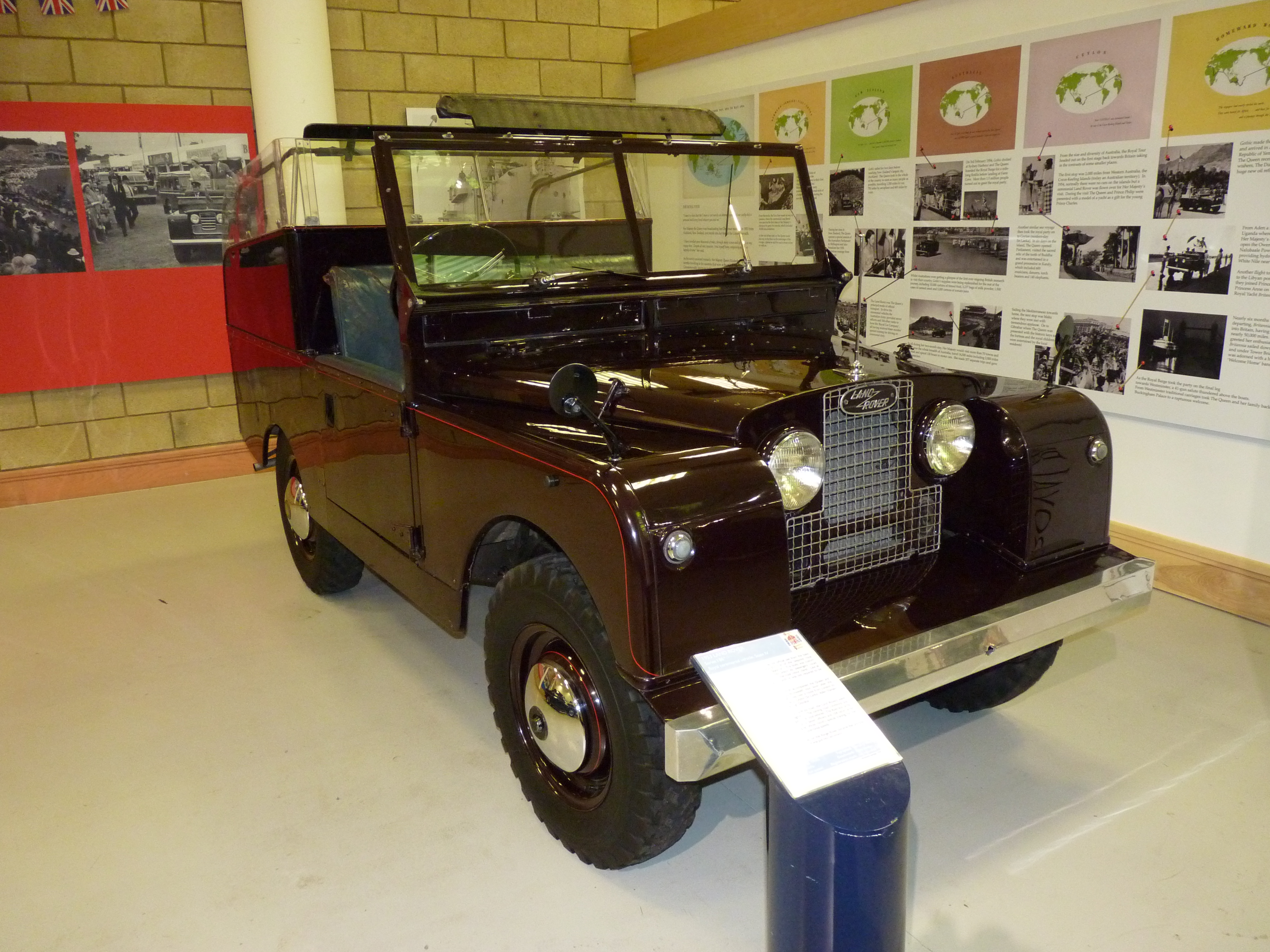
1953 Land Rover (State Royal Review Vehicle).

The Royal Mews acquired its first Land Rover in 1948, when the Rover company presented George VI with its 100th production vehicle. Since then the company has provided many different vehicles for royal use, both private and official. In 1953 a Series I Land Rover, custom designed with a rear platform for standing passengers, was acquired. Painted in royal claret, it was designated 'State I' and served as the first in a succession of State Royal Review Vehicles. It was used extensively during the six-month Coronation Tour of the Commonwealth, undertaken by Queen Elizabeth II and the Duke of Edinburgh that same year. A Series II Land Rover, built to a similar specification, was then acquired in 1958 (and designated 'State II' Royal Review Vehicle). When not required for use these vehicles were kept at Rover's Solihull plant, along with another Series I (built for the Commonwealth Tour, but painted blue) which had the designation 'State III'. In 1974 a bespoke Range Rover took over as 'State I', and the 1953 Land Rover was redesignated as 'State IV'. The Range Rover was replaced with a newer model in 1989, which was likewise replaced in 1996. Like all state vehicles for the use of the monarch, the State Royal Review Vehicles were not required to be registered and so do not have number plates.

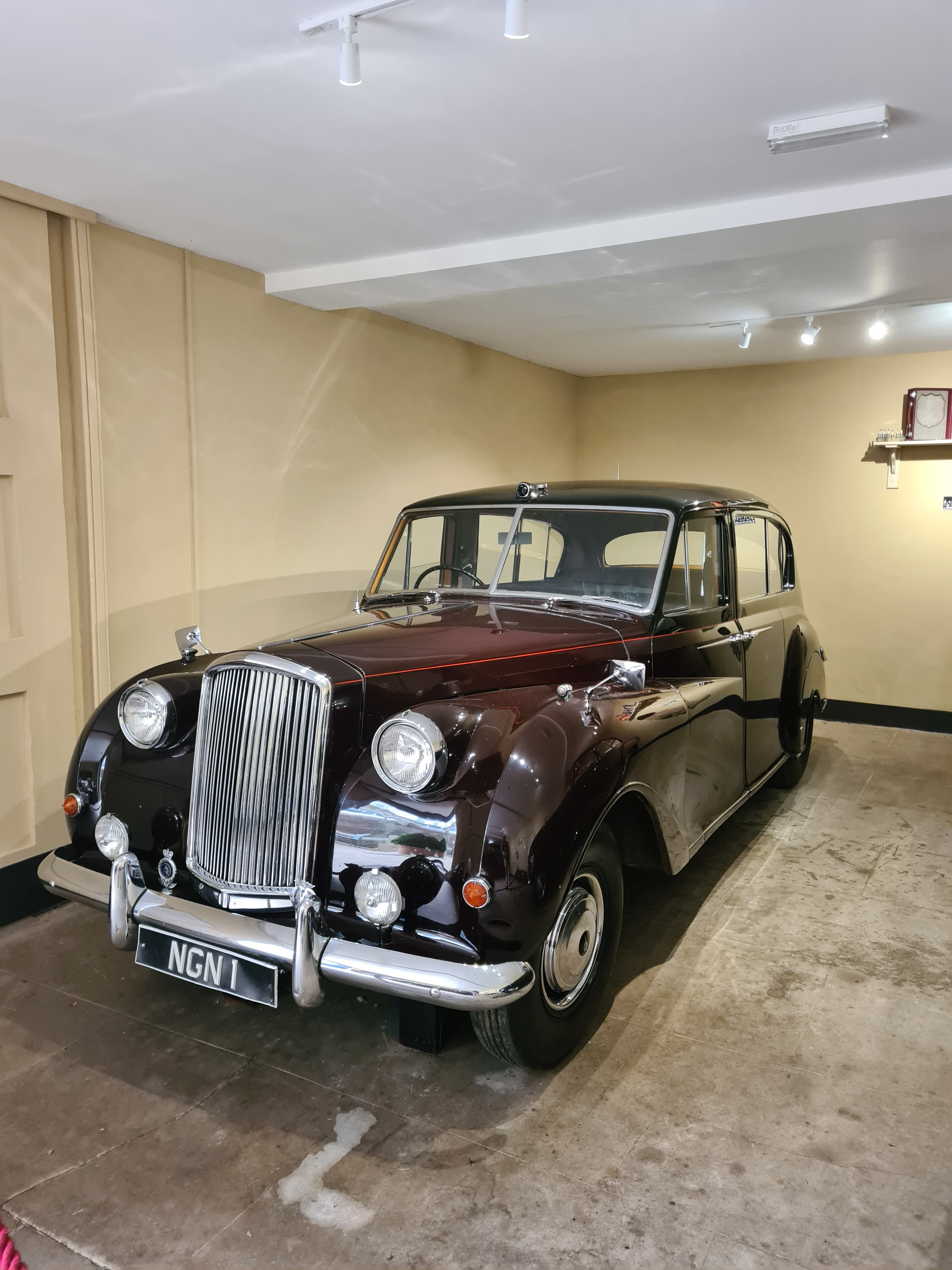
1969 Austin Princess, on display at Sandringham.

The Royal Mews traditionally retained a small number of additional limousines, informally known as 'Household cars': often painted grey or black, these were used 'to convey Officers of His Majesty's Household on official duties which require a car' (according to a memorandum of 1931). In 1952, Daimler had offered to sell the Mews two of its 'Royal Stock' vehicles as replacement Household cars; however the Palace decided that the newly-launched Austin A135 Princess Long Wheelbase Limousine would be a suitable (and less expensive) replacement. The first two production models were purchased that same year, and registered (as NGN 1 and NGN 2). Later, the Crown Equerry mooted that these might be very suitable, 'especially if painted in the Royal colours', to be used as 'second cars' on official occasions, 'to carry those in waiting on Her Majesty' (a task usually undertaken at that time by a second State car). Replacement pairs of Princess limousines were subsequently acquired, in 1958 and 1964; and in 1969 the last two cars to be produced were kept aside by the company before being likewise purchased by the Royal Household in 1972. Painted in the royal colours of claret and black, they were used regularly by junior members of the Royal Family on official engagements, or as 'secondary vehicles', when they would convey accompanying members of the Royal Household following behind a State Car.

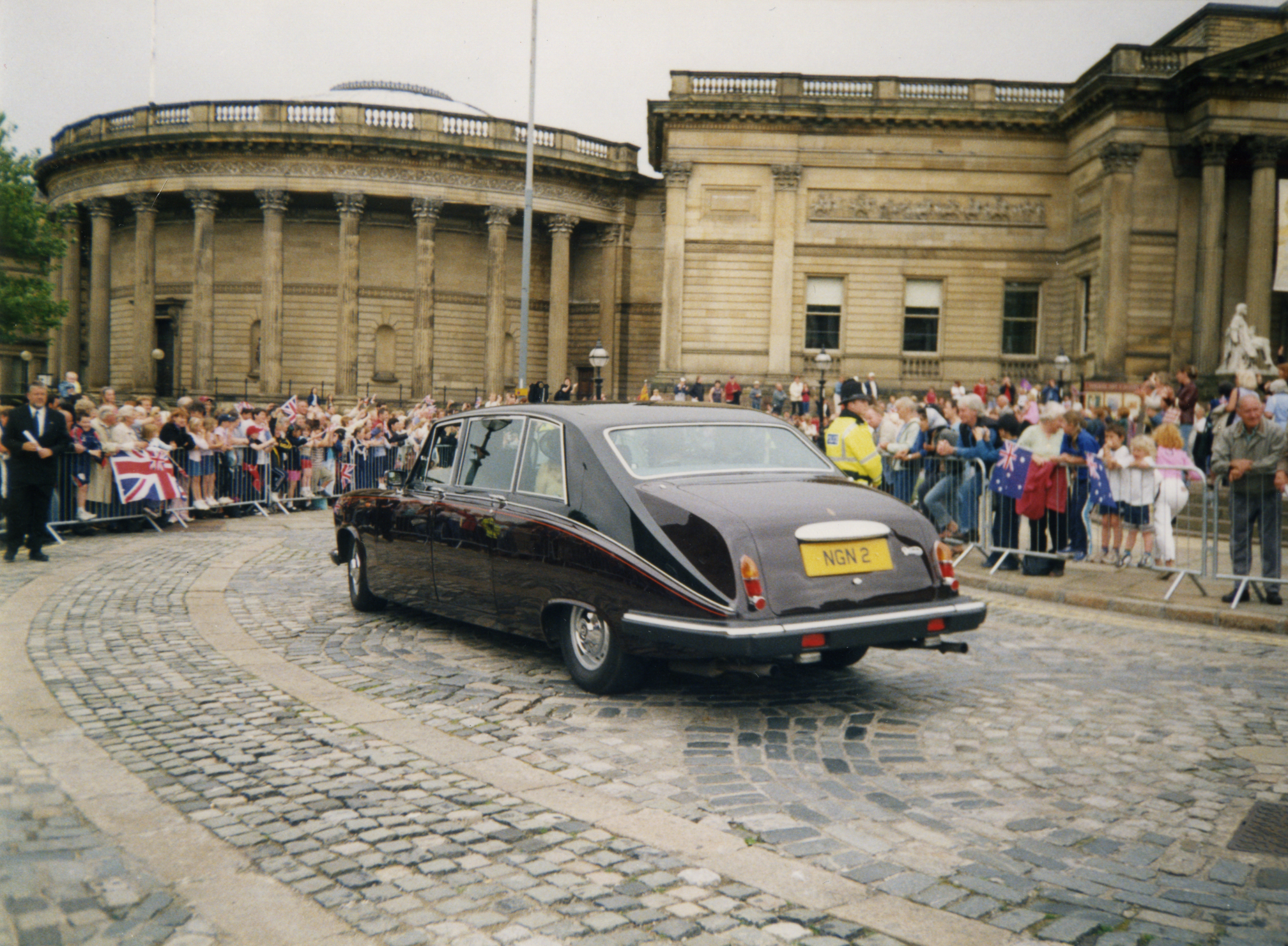
A Daimler DS420 limousine following the State Car on a royal visit to Liverpool.

In 1984 a Daimler DS420 limousine had been added to the royal fleet (it was often used by the Prince and Princess of Wales); a second DS420 was purchased in 1987, whereupon the two Princess limousines were retired. The following year a third Daimler DS420 was added to the fleet; this car remained in royal use into the 21st century, along with two more DS420s dating from 1992 (and initially registered NGN1 and NGN2), which were among the last of these limousines to be manufactured. During the 1980s and 90s these Daimler limousines were regularly used by younger members of the Royal Family for their public engagements.

== State and royal cars in the 21st century ==
In 1998, Rolls-Royce Motors was sold by its then owner Vickers plc to the Volkswagen Group; however, it transpired that the sale did not include rights to the Rolls-Royce name and logo (which were owned by the aerospace company Rolls-Royce plc, and could only be used under licence). Rights to the name and logo were subsequently acquired by BMW (who set up their own entirely separate company to manufacture cars under the Rolls-Royce brand); while Volkswagen (having renamed its subsidiary Bentley) went on to use the acquired expertise of the Rolls-Royce factory at Crewe to build cars of the Bentley marque.

=== The Bentley era ===
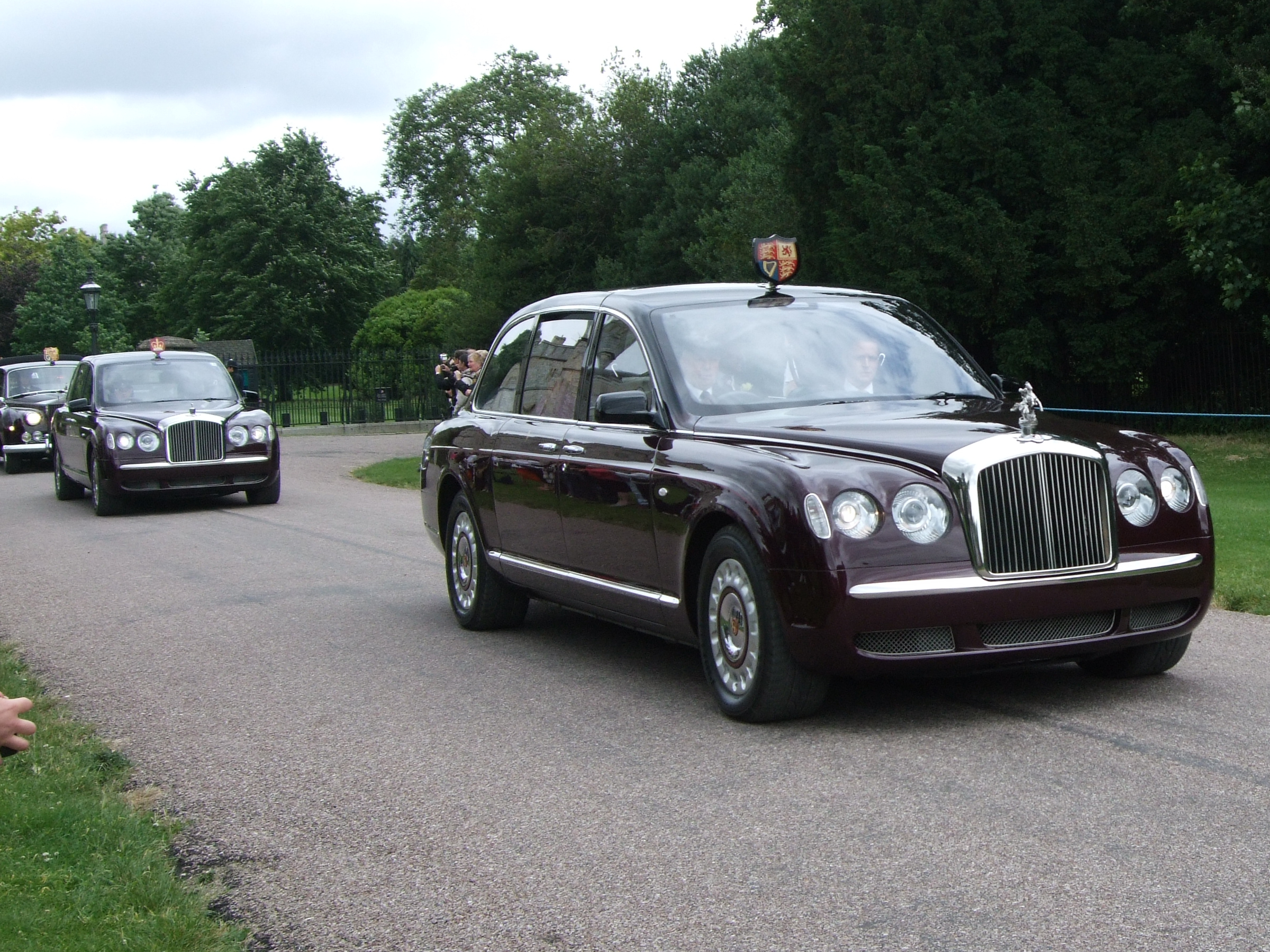
Two Bentley State Limousines were commissioned as state cars for the Golden Jubilee of Elizabeth II in 2002.

In 2002, the Queen acquired a new pair of state cars: two armoured Bentley State Limousines. The first was presented to her by 'a consortium of British based automotive manufacturing and service companies' as a gift to mark her Golden Jubilee that year, and became her new Number 1 State Car; the second was purchased at the same time, to serve as her Number 2 car.

These custom-built vehicles were based on the Bentley Arnage floorplan, with a twin-turbocharged 6.75 litre V8 engine producing 400 horsepower (300 kW) and 616 pound-feet (835 N⋅m) of torque, giving a maximum speed of 130 miles per hour (210 km/h). The state limousines are 3 feet (0.91 m) longer than a standard Bentley Arnage, 10 inches (250 mm) taller and 6 inches (150 mm) wider. They are equipped with broad rear-hinged doors that open almost 90 degrees; they also have opaque rear window panels that can be installed for increased privacy when required, or else removed to allow improved visibility when the occupant is attending a public event.

==== Charles III ====
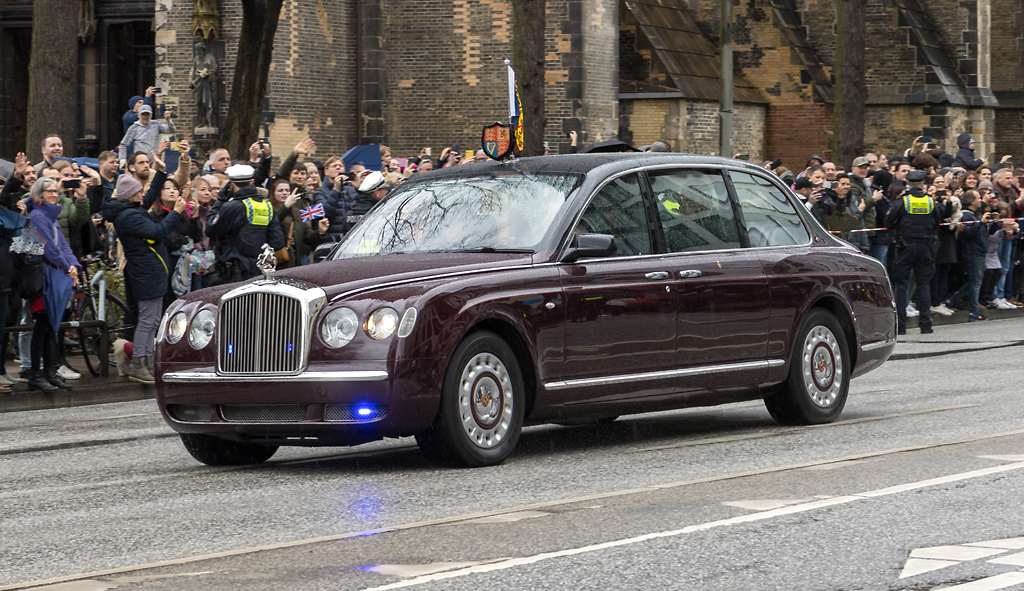
The King and Queen in one of the Bentley state cars in Hamburg, during a State Visit to Germany in 2023.

As of 2025, the two 2002 Bentleys continue to serve as state cars, along with three Rolls-Royce Phantom limousines: the Rolls-Royce Phantom IV which was purchased by Princess Elizabeth and the Duke of Edinburgh in 1950 (becoming a state car upon her accession to the throne two years later), the 1978 Rolls-Royce Phantom VI (the 'Silver Jubilee car') and the 1987 Rolls-Royce Phantom VI.

The day after his accession, King Charles III and Queen Camilla arrived at Buckingham Palace in the 1978 Rolls-Royce Phantom VI state limousine; in the days that followed, they used the 1950 Rolls-Royce Phantom IV state limousine in London and the 1978 Phantom VI in Edinburgh and Cardiff (each sporting the mascots previously used by his mother, along with the sovereign's shield and standard). On the day of his mother's funeral all five state cars were used, as well as the new state hearse (which conveyed the coffin from Wellington Arch to Windsor Castle).

As Prince of Wales, Charles often used a claret and black 1962 Rolls-Royce Phantom V Landaulette (registration plate NLT 1) on formal occasions, which he had inherited from his grandmother, Queen Elizabeth the Queen Mother; (he later had it converted with a fixed roof in place of the former open top). The car was often paired with the late Queen Mother's Britannia mascot (which had formerly adorned the state cars of both King George VI and George V). It remains in occasional use.

In 2023, the King and Queen were presented with a new Rolls-Royce Cullinan II as a Coronation gift from the King of Bahrain. In 2026 it began to be used as a support vehicle, having been painted in royal claret and black livery, with the registration plate NLT 2.

=== Other official vehicles ===
The State Review Vehicle is a bespoke 2015 Range Rover Hybrid used for parades and other official rides. This was the last in a series of Royal Review Vehicles built during the reign of Elizabeth II by Land Rover; it replaced a 2002 model, (though both vehicles were used together as part of the Queen's 90th birthday celebrations in 2016).

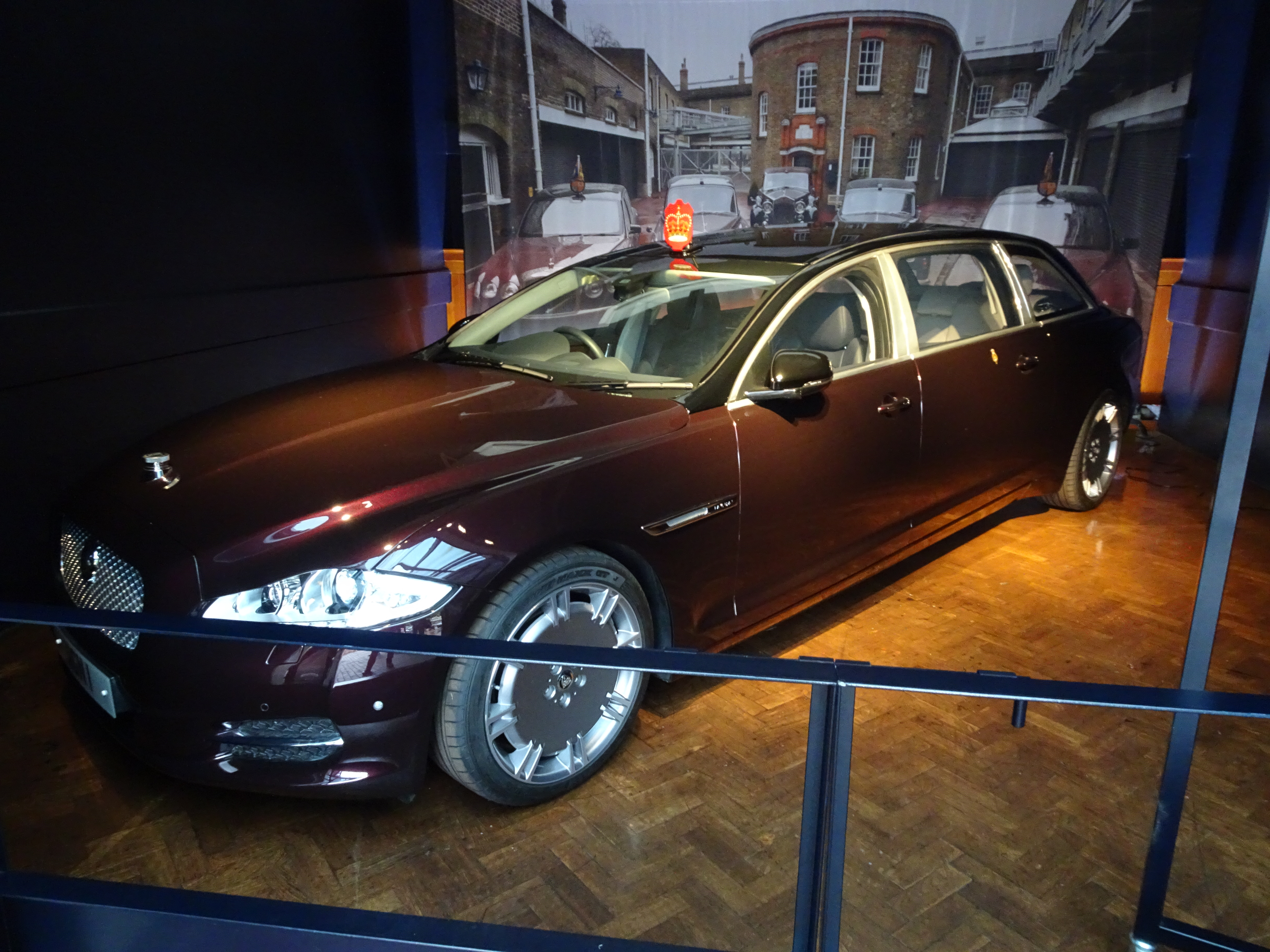
One of the two 2012 Jaguar XJ limousines in the Royal Mews

The official fleet was augmented in 2012 by two stretched Jaguar XJ formal limousines (with number plates NGN 1 and NGN 2), acquired in 2012 and used as support vehicles; they are painted in claret and black and have fittings for a mascot, roof flag and shield. The three Daimler DS420 limousines (acquired in 1988 and 1992) also continued to be used on formal occasions; all three were used to convey the bridesmaids and pages at Royal Wedding in 2018.

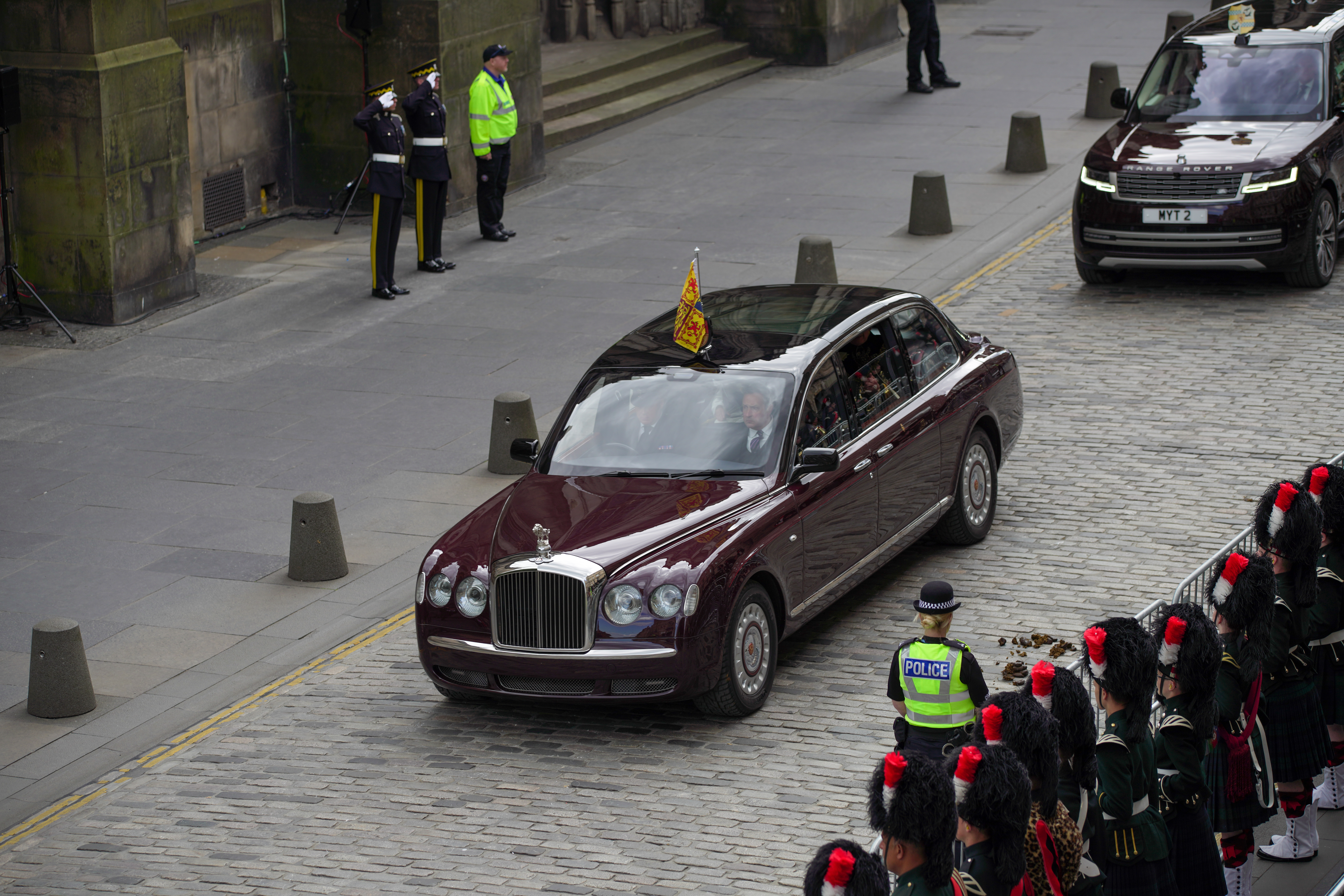
The Duke of Rothesay travelling in a 2022 Range Rover (MYT 2), behind the King in his 2002 State Bentley (Edinburgh 2023).

In 2022, three new Range Rovers were added to the official fleet with number plates MYT 1, MYT 2, and MYT 3. Like the other official cars, they are painted in claret and black and decorated with the royal crest, with fittings for a flag and illuminated crest on the roof, plus a bonnet mascot.

As of 2025, a number of vehicles for Royal Household use are provided by Mercedes-Benz UK Ltd.

== Retired state vehicles on public display ==
=== The Royal Car Collection at Sandringham ===
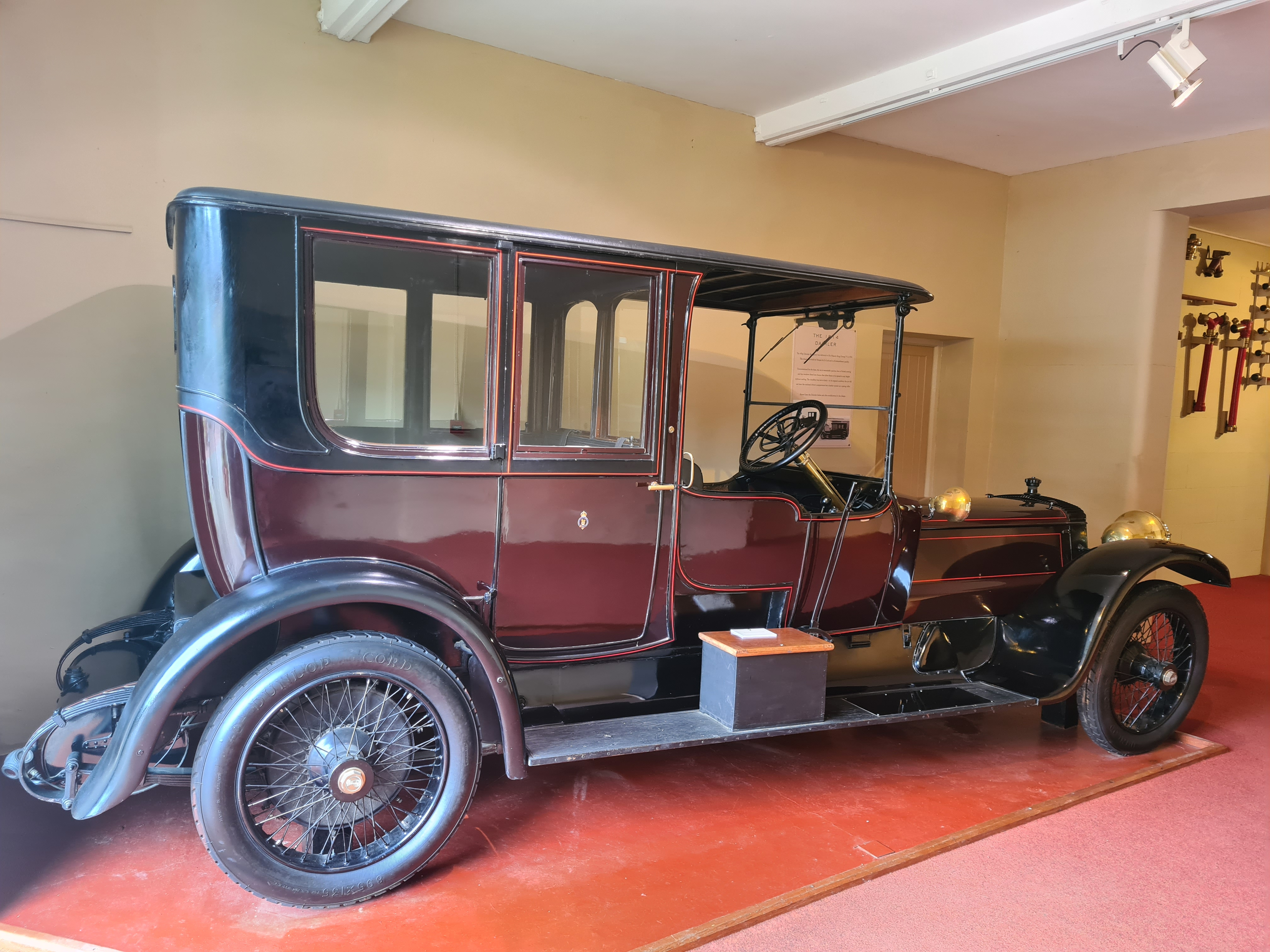
George V's 1914 Daimler 45hp Brougham in the Sandringham museum.

A few ex-royal cars were retained by Daimler, rather than being sold on. After the Second World War the company had thoughts of setting up a museum and King George VI loaned another car with this purpose in mind (his father's 1914 Brougham, which was residing in a garage at York Cottage, Sandringham). The museum did not come to fruition, and in 1965 Daimler offered to return the car and to present three more to the King (including Edward VII's 1900 mail phaeton); these went on to form the basis of a motor museum, initially based at Buckingham Palace and then at Sandringham House.

Other cars have since been loaned to the museum, or placed there following retirement from regular use, and today the Royal Car Collection contains a representative selection of vehicles dating from the early 1900s; it can be seen as part of the Sandringham Exhibition and Transport Museum, which is housed in the old Coach House and Stables complex on the estate, part of which also served as the royal garages.

=== Other museums ===
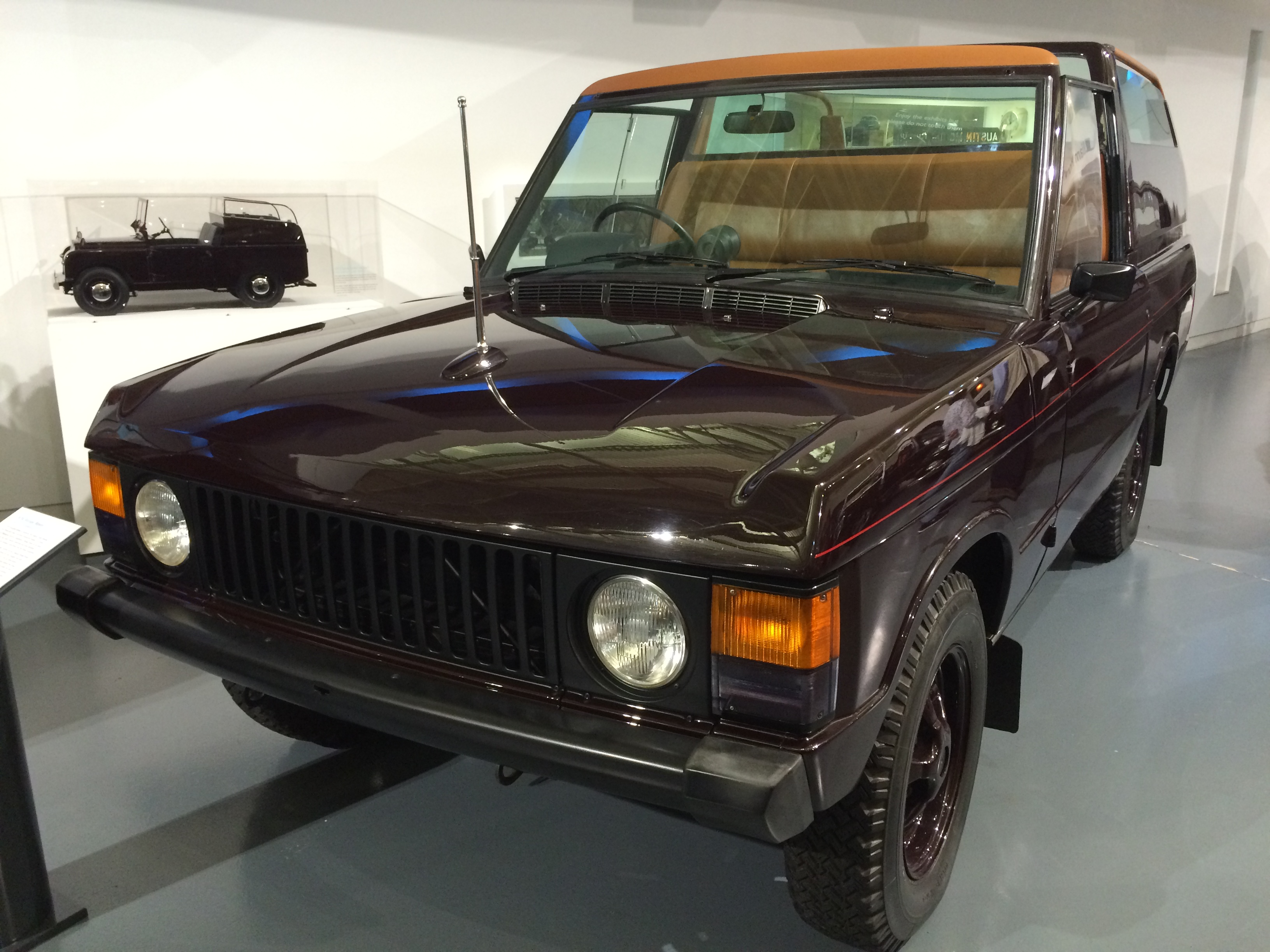
1974 Range Rover (State Royal Review Vehicle) at the British Motor Museum, Gaydon.

In the early 20th century, it became established practice for old royal cars to be taken in part-exchange, either by the manufacturer or by Stratton-Instone, when a new car was delivered. Before these were sold on, they were routinely re-registered, repainted and had their royal insignia removed.

In 2002, with the arrival of the new Bentley state limousines, the two Rolls-Royce Phantom V state cars were retired. One of them was transferred to Sandringham (where it remains on public display). The other was transferred to Bentley, together with the 1954 Phantom IV State Landaulette. Both went on to form part of the company's 'heritage fleet': for a time they were kept on public display (the Phantom IV at the Sir Henry Royce Memorial Foundation, Paulerspury, the Phantom V in the garage of HM Yacht Britannia), but both cars were auctioned off by the company in 2018.

The Historic Vehicle Collection of the British Motor Industry Heritage Trust includes three former State Royal Review Vehicles: the 1953 and 1958 Land Rovers and the 1974 Range Rover; the collection also includes (or has on loan) a number of other cars currently or previously owned by the Queen or members of the Royal Family. Several of these are displayed by the Trust at the British Motor Museum in Gaydon.

The Jaguar Daimler Heritage Trust collection includes several vehicles which were formerly owned by Queen Elizabeth the Queen Mother (she had requested that her last Daimler limousine should be returned to the company after her death, along with her Jaguar XJ12). Cars from the collection are regularly displayed at Gaydon and at the Coventry Transport Museum.

== Personal vehicles of the King and senior members of the Royal Family ==
=== Present ===
Prior to his accession, the King made use of 'a Jaguar XJ and a range of new low and zero emissions vehicles'. He owns an Aston Martin DB6 Volante, converted to run on E85 fuel partially made from wine wastage and a by-product of cheese-making. For some engagements a Bentley (owned by the Metropolitan Police) is employed for security reasons. For journeys around central London, he acquired an all-electric Jaguar I-Pace in 2018. The Queen still uses an Audi A8L vehicle, as she did before her husband's accession, for her solo official engagements outside of London

=== Past ===
==== Charles III ====
The current king's first car was an MGC GT, which he drove from January 1968; this was followed by a 1970 Aston Martin DB6 Mk II Volante, given to him by his mother as a 21st birthday present. He later drove a V8 Vantage Volante from 1987 to 1995 (a gift from the Emir of Bahrain), and then leased a Virage Volante until 2007. Over the years he also drove or was driven in various models of Bentley and Jaguar cars, as well as two Audi A6 allroad quattros.

==== Elizabeth II ====
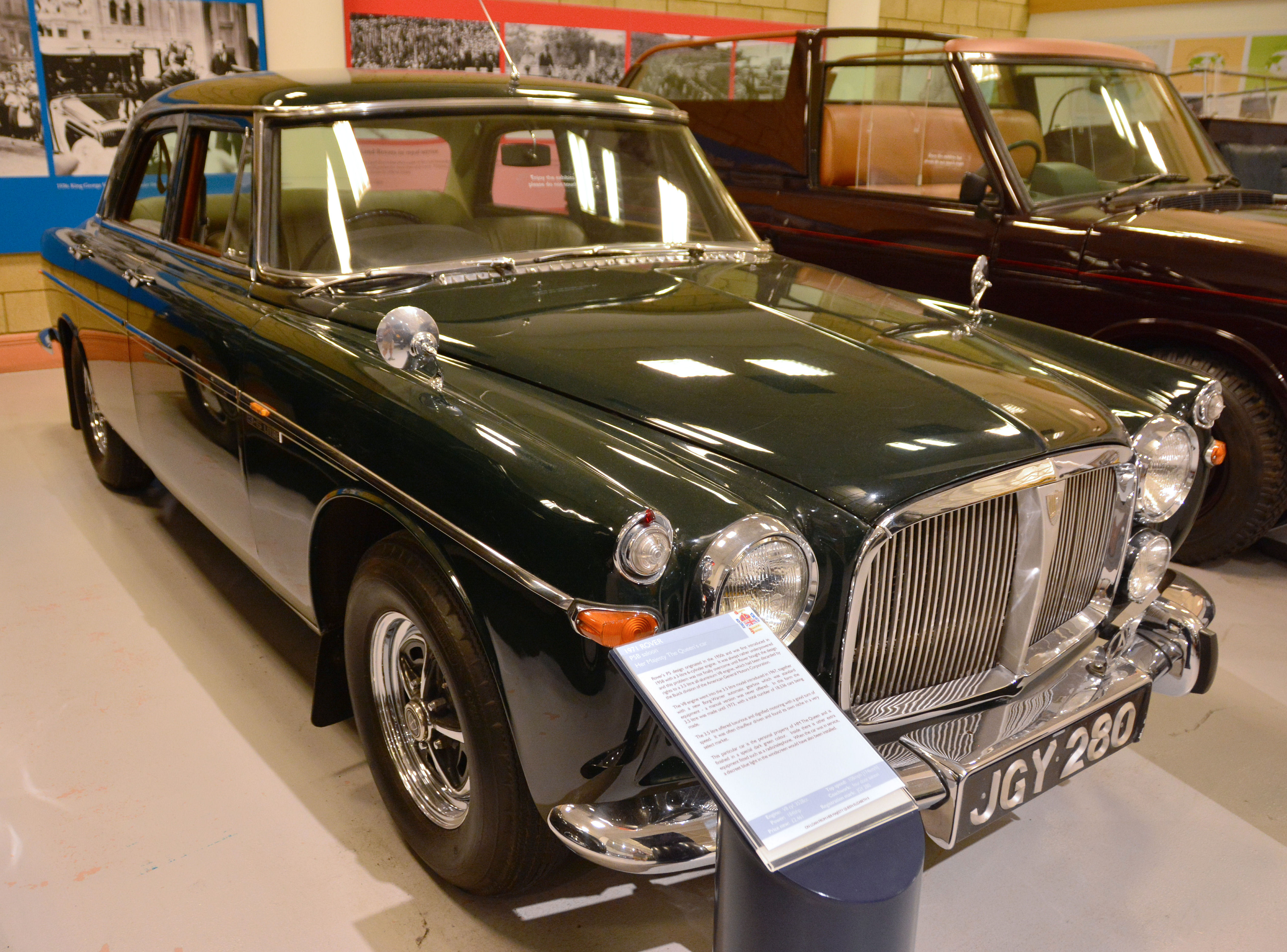
Elizabeth II's Edinburgh green 1971 Rover P5B saloon, on loan to the British Motor Museum, Gaydon.

In 1944, King George VI bought his daughter Princess Elizabeth a Daimler DB 18 saloon for her 18th birthday; she learned to drive in this car, which had the number plate JGY 280. Shortly after her accession to the throne in 1952, Elizabeth II took delivery of a new Daimler for personal use: a 3-litre Hooper Empress Mark II; she transferred the registration number from the old car to the new one. (The 'Empress' was sold in 1959, but the Queen retained the number plate for use on her private vehicles in subsequent decades). In 1956, the Royal Family acquired its the first modern estate car, a Ford Zephyr; since 1961, the Queen had owned a series of Vauxhall estate cars (as of 2016 Vauxhall was one of four carmakers, along with Bentley, Jaguar Land Rover and Volkswagen, to hold the Queen's Royal Warrant for supplying motor vehicles). During the 1960s and early 1970s, the Queen owned a series of Rover 3 Litre and 3.5 Litre saloons. Subsequently she had owned a succession of Jaguar saloon cars (or their Daimler-badged equivalents), along with various generations of Land Rover and Range Rover. In the year before she died she was still known to drive herself (on the Windsor estate), being seen at the wheel of a dark green Range Rover in July, and a Jaguar X-Type estate in November, 2021. Latterly, she was often driven to engagements in a hybrid-electric Range Rover, and used a similar vehicle (in place of the usual state coach) to travel to and from the Palace of Westminster for the State Opening of Parliament in 2021 (which took place with reduced ceremonials due to COVID-19).

==== Prince Philip, Duke of Edinburgh ====
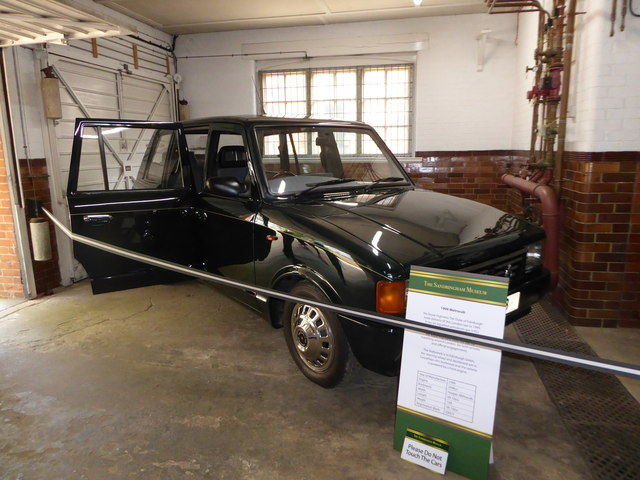
The Duke of Edinburgh's 1999 Metrocab displayed at Sandringham.

At the time of his marriage, the Duke of Edinburgh owned an MG TC Midget. In 1954, he bought a larger car: an Edinburgh green Lagonda 3-Litre Drophead Coupé (registered OXR 1) (while official royal vehicles are painted 'claret and black', the personal vehicles of the Queen and the Duke of Edinburgh have almost always been 'Edinburgh green', the family livery colour which they adopted at the time of their marriage in 1948). He later took the car with him on board Britannia for his 1956-57 royal tour of the Commonwealth. In 1961 he replaced this car with an Alvis TD 21 Drop Head Coupé, which is today preserved in the motor museum at Sandringham; the Duke likewise transferred the registration number from the old car to the new (and would use the same number plate on several subsequent cars). In the mid-1970s he began to use a Range Rover as his principal private car. For journeys in Central London he acquired a Bedford CF Lucas electric vehicle in 1980, which he replaced with a newer version later that decade. It was succeeded in 1993 by a dark green 2.5 litre Metrocab (a type of London Taxi), itself replaced in 1999 by an LPG-fuelled model (which, like its predecessor, was registered OXR 3); this was in regular use until 2017, whereupon it was donated to the Sandringham motor museum. Latterly, the Duke of Edinburgh was known to drive a Land Rover Freelander (OXR 1) and a Land Rover Discovery (OXR 2), both in the characteristic Edinburgh green colour scheme.

==== Queen Elizabeth the Queen Mother ====
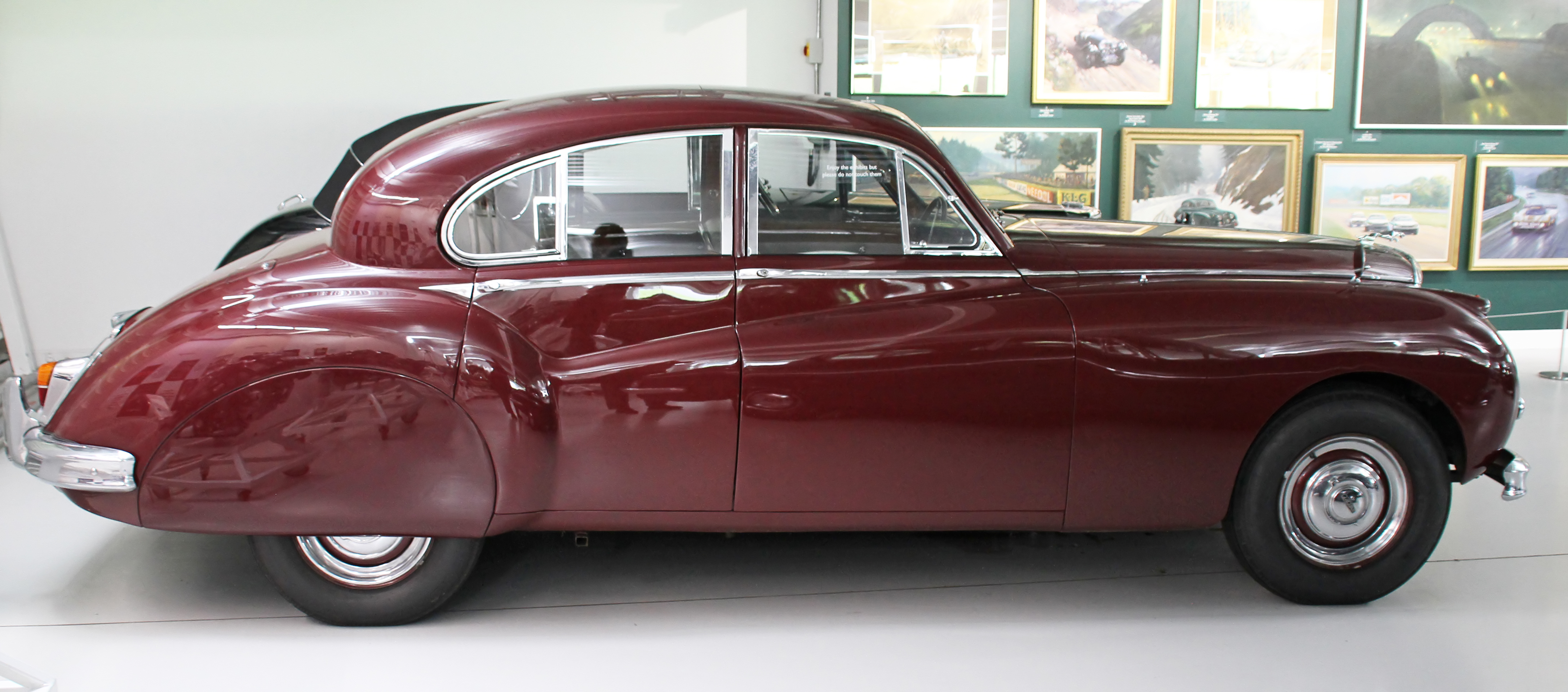
1955 Jaguar Mark VII M saloon, formerly the Queen Mother's, now part of the Jaguar Heritage Collection.

Following her daughter's accession, the Queen Mother inherited her late husband's personal car (a 1950 Daimler 2½ Litre Sports Coupé). In 1955 she bought a Hooper-bodied Daimler DK400 limousine (registered NLT 1) which she retained until 1974. Designed for her personal use, it was finished in non-royal colours and had no provision for a shield, flag or blue lamp; on its radiator grille it usually carried one of the lion mascots previously used on her husband's Lanchester cars. That same year she also acquired a Jaguar Mark VII M saloon (NLT 7) for private use, finished in a metallic claret colour, which she retained until 1973, when it was replaced with a Vanden Plas-styled long-wheelbase XJ12 model (again registered NLT 7), which she kept until she died.

==== Princess Margaret ====
One of Princess Margaret's favourite cars was a 1980 Rolls-Royce Silver Wraith II, which she owned for 22 years until her death. It replaced a 1975 Rolls-Royce Silver Shadow built much to the same specifications. Both were finished in Cardinal Red with a black Everflex covered roof, complete with standard pennant and Royal Crest mountings.

Unique to these cars was a matte rosewood dash and door cappings in black nuala leather, specifically requested by her then husband, the photographer Antony Armstrong-Jones, to reduce the reflection of flashes by paparazzi and portray its very public occupants in a poor light. The rear bench seat was also raised a couple centimeters to allow its occupants to be better seen by the public. Both the Wraith and the Shadow carried the registration number '3 GXM'.

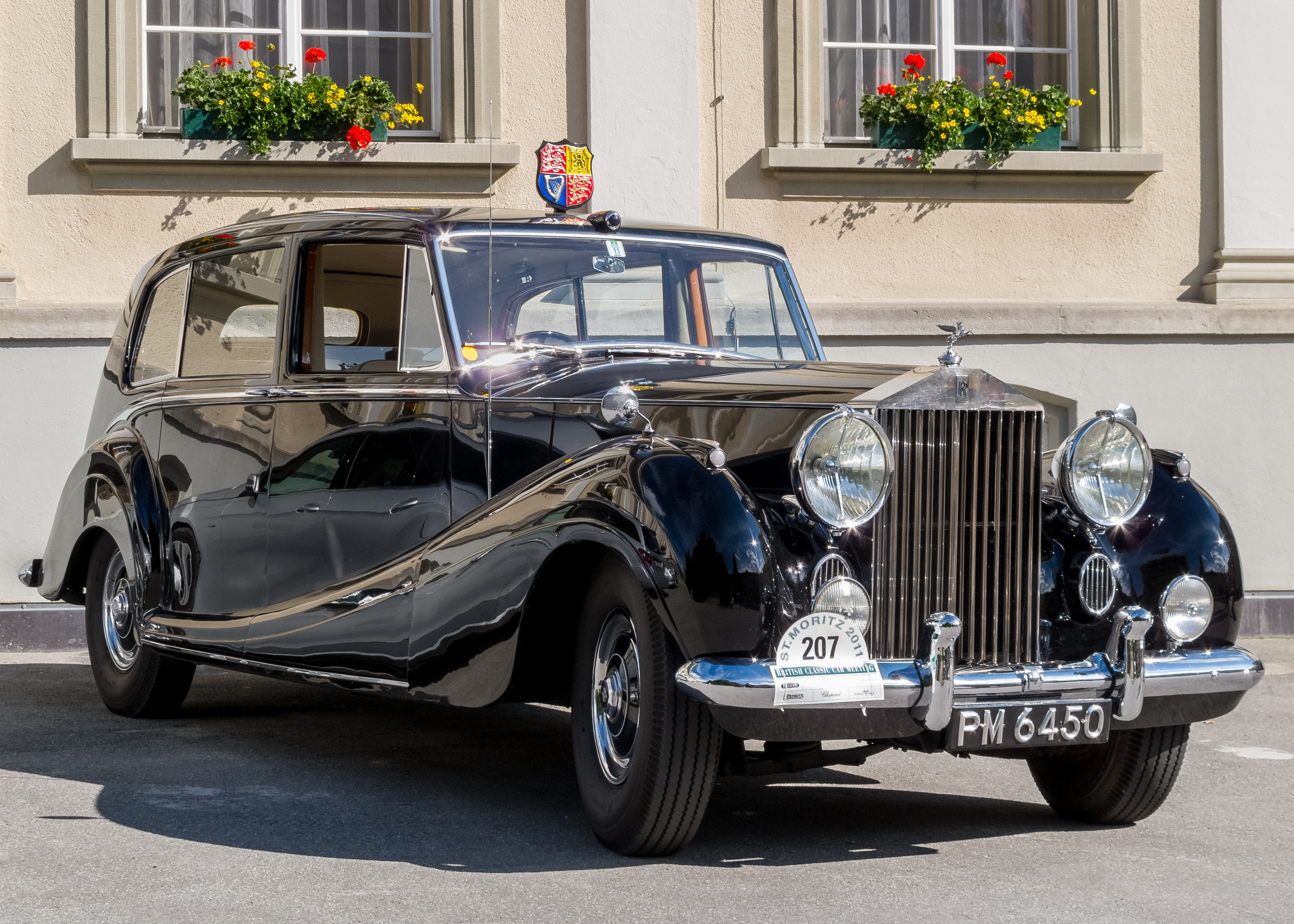
Margaret's 1954 Rolls-Royce Phantom IV

Previously, Margaret owned one of the 18 Rolls-Royce Phantom IVs built, chassis 4BP7, delivered in 1954 and fitted out by H.J. Mulliner. It had a slightly higher and more elongated wing line than her sister's Phantom, and featured an automatic transmission, rare for the era on what was normally a chauffeur driven car, but specially ordered with an adjustable driver's seat so Margaret could drive herself if warranted. Like her sister, she swapped out the traditional "Spirit of Ecstasy" with another custom Edward Seago design, hers a winged Pegasus rather than the Queen's "St George Slaying the Dragon".

In 1967, the Phantom IV was part-exchanged (and sold after to a Private owner) for a new Rolls-Royce Silver Shadow Long Wheel Base (built on the experimental chassis LRH 2542). This car was finished in Velvet green and carried specific interior accoutrements including AC and Stereo ordered by the Princess along with the Special Blue light on the roof. The new car was taken to Princesse's liking so much so that 4 more cars were ordered consecutively, replacing one another.

The replacement to the first Silver Shadow followed in December 1971, when the new car Rolls-Royce Silver Shadow LWB finished in Regal Red with a black vinyl roof was completed and delivered to the Princess Margaret's Private Secretary. This car (chassis LRH 10823) had similar fittings to its predecessor and no division between driver and passengers. This was the first car registered with number plate '3 GXM' that was carried over to the subsequent Rolls-Royce vehicles owned by the Princess.

In total, Margaret owned 6 cars from Rolls-Royce during her lifetime, including a Silver Cloud II and 2 more Silver Shadows.

==== Diana, Princess of Wales ====
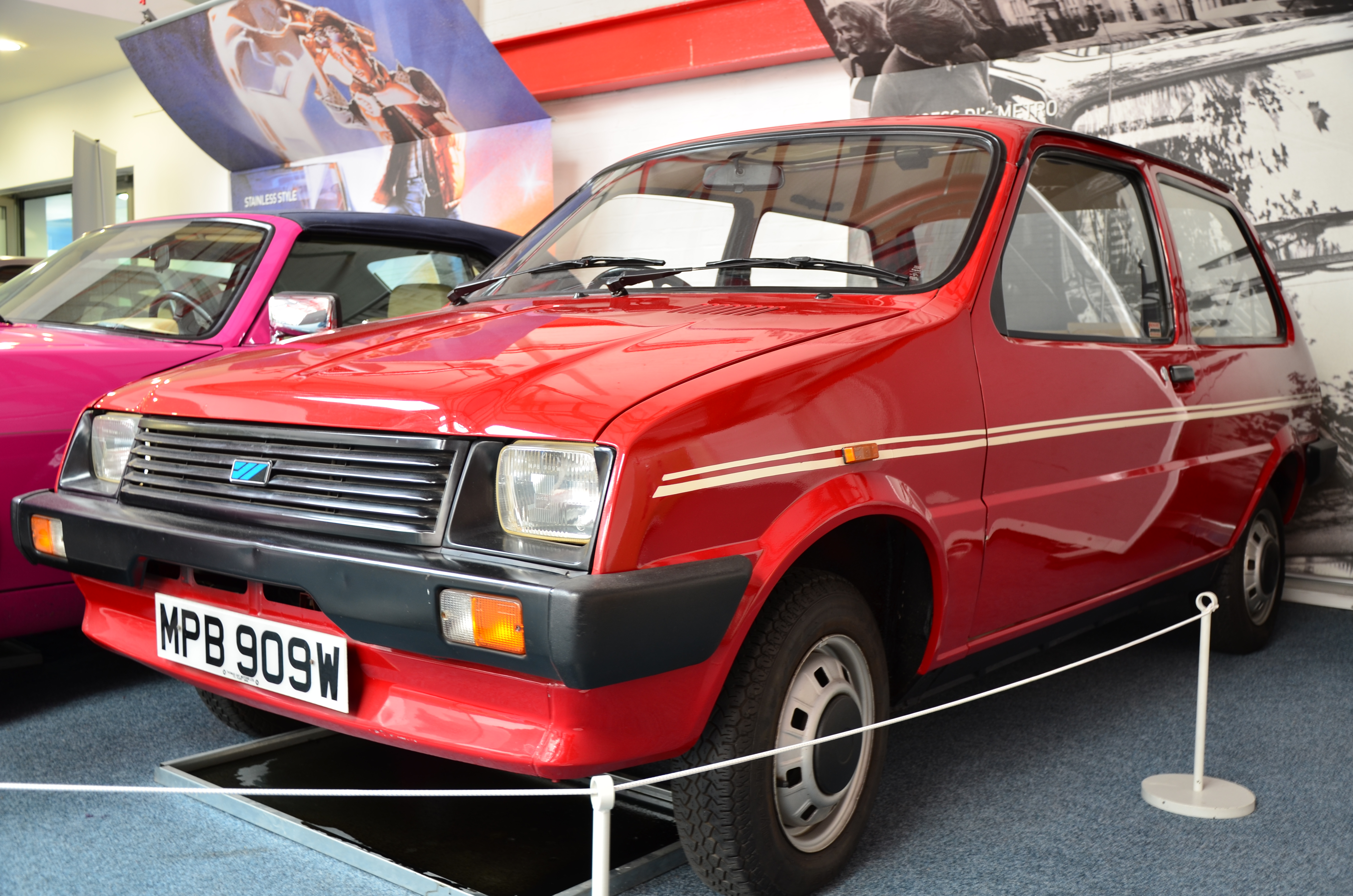
Diana's 1980 Austin Metro at Coventry Motor Museum

Before her marriage to Prince Charles, Lady Diana Spencer drove an Austin Metro. She was associated with BMW, Jaguar, and Mercedes cars over the course of her life, but the 2 cars she was most photographed driving were 3 different European spec Ford Escorts and 3 different Audi Cabriolets. Her first Escort was an engagement gift from Charles, a 1981 Escort Ghia, which was traded in for a red Escort convertible which Royalty Protection Command thought drew too much attention. She was convinced to trade it in for a custom 1985 Escort RS Turbo that Protection Command determined was powerful enough to get the Princess out of trouble should the need arise, while being specially outfitted in standard Escort paint and body parts to be able to discreetly blend in with the over 1.5 million Escorts registered on UK roads by 1989.

After her separation from Charles, Diana tried out a Jaguar XJS and a Mercedes SL before borrowing a friend's Audi Cabriolet, which soon became the model she was most identified with. Her green 1994 Cabriolet was referred to as “possibly the most photographed car of the summer of 1994”; she and the car were frequent photographed all over London, often with the young princes in tow. She is said to have inspired many of the 'Sloane Ranger set' to emulate her choice in cars.

== See also ==
- Prime Ministerial Car
- Government Car Service
- Royal Mews
- Air transport of the Royal Family and government of the United Kingdom
- List of royal yachts of the United Kingdom
- Royal barge of the United Kingdom
- British Royal Train
- Royal Automobile Club
