= National Car Museum of Iran =

Museum in Tehran, Iran

Coordinates: 35.71532°N 51.22219°E

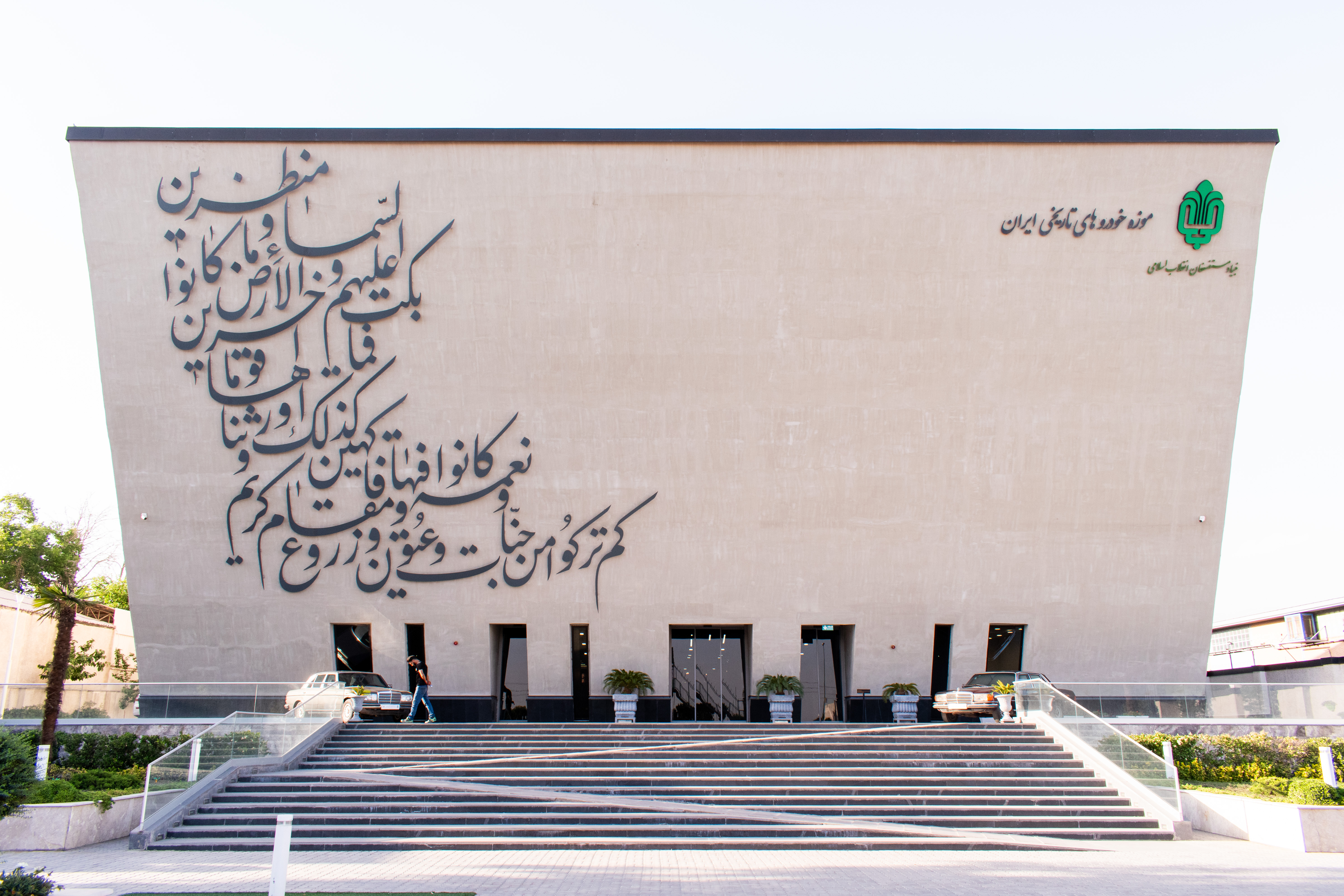
- Established: 2001
- Location: Tehran, Iran

The National Car Museum of Iran (Persian: موزه ملی خودرو ایران, romanized: Muze Melli Xodrou Irân) is a museum in Tehran, Iran, opened in 2001. The museum displays classic cars owned by the last Shah of the Pahlavi dynasty, Mohammad Reza Shah. In addition to the large museum which is open to the public, there is a restoration center at the back closed to the public.

== Cars in the Museum ==
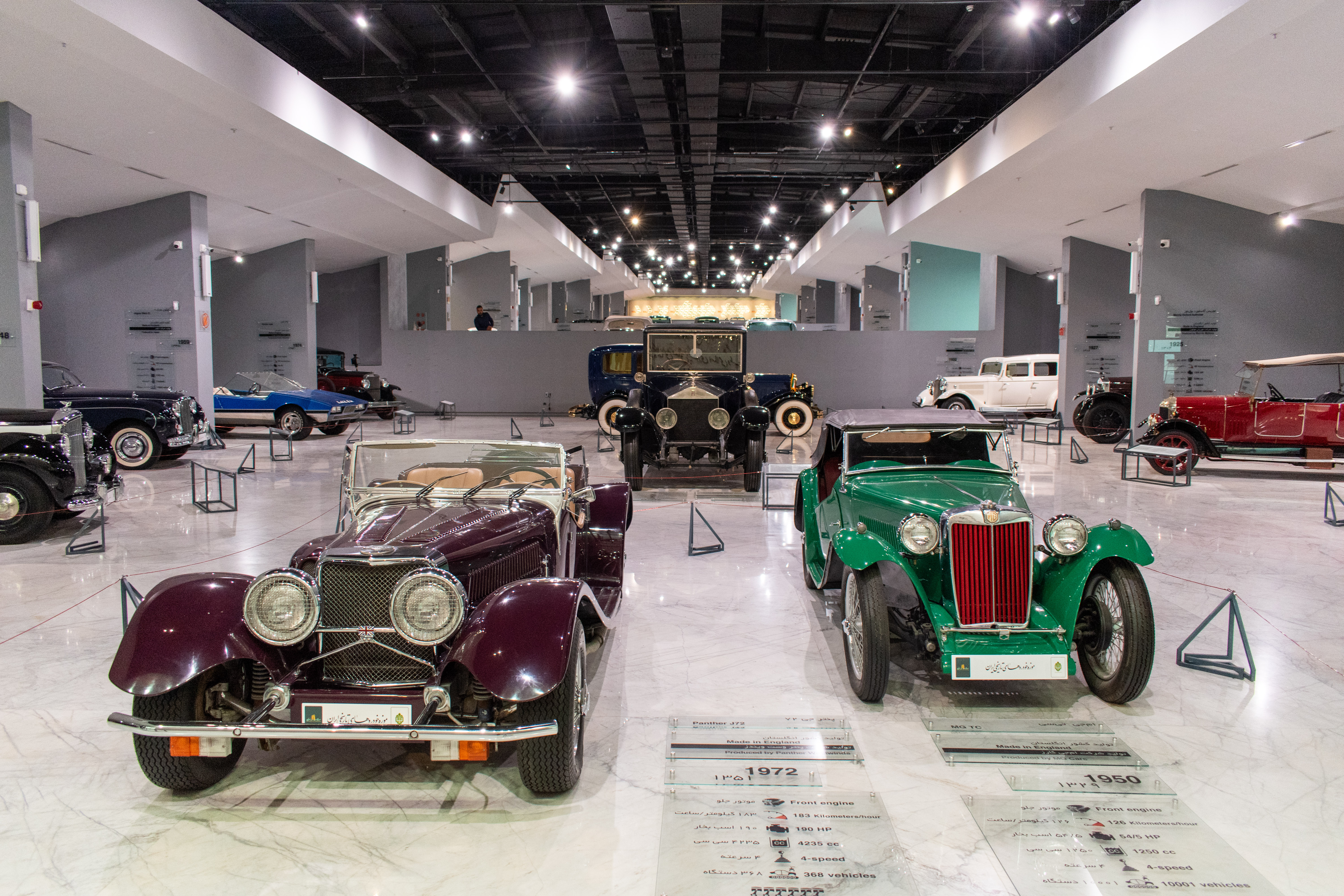
A portion of the car collection

There are many vehicles in the museum, ranging from sports cars to limousines, along with carriages and bikes that carried the royal family. Some of the items include:

- Rolls-Royce Silver Ghost (Black)
- Rolls-Royce Phantom I (Black)
- Rolls-Royce Phantom II (Black)
- Rolls-Royce Phantom III (Black)
- Rolls-Royce Silver Cloud III (Convertible, Maroon)
- Rolls-Royce Phantom IV (Black)
- Rolls-Royce Phantom V (Maroon)
- Rolls-Royce Phantom VI (Maroon)
- Rolls-Royce Corniche (Navy Blue)
- Rolls-Royce Camargue (Caribbean Blue)
- Jaguar Mark IX
- Daimler DS420
- Stutz Blackhawk
- Lamborghini Miura (White)
- Lamborghini Espada (Brown)
- Lamborghini Countach (Metallic red) Gift to Mohammad Reza Pahlavi from his aunt, after he passed driving test.
- Ford Mustang
- Cadillac Eldorado (Silver) Empress Farah Diba's car
- Chrysler 300 1956 Special K300 - a one-off example with a body designed by Ghia, said to have been a wedding present of the Shah to his second wife, Queen Soraya, equipped with fridge and record player
- Mercedes-Benz 500K originally equipped with a 540K engine - one of six W29 "Autobahn-Kurier" ever built, one of two survivors. Currently a Cadillac in-line 8-cylinder engine of obscure provenience is installed in the car.
- Mercedes-Benz 600 three LWB (2 Landaulets of 59 ever built) cars; one SWB car
- Mercedes-Benz 190SL W121
- Mercedes-Benz W111 280SE
- Mercedes-Benz Type 300 Sc, W188I, Cabriolet A with Landau bars
- Mercedes-Benz Type 300 S, W188II, 2+2 coupé
- Morris Oxford
- Jensen Interceptor III
- Fiat 519
- Ferrari 365 4+4 (Silver)
- Ferrari 500 Superfast Superamerica
- Maserati Ghibli Coupé
- MPV Tehran Type
  - This car had been specifically designed as a joint project by Mercedes-Benz, Porsche and Volkswagen for the last Crown Prince of Iran, Reza Pahlavi.
- Panther Lazer One-Off
- Bizzarrini 5300 GT Strada
- Porsche 934 (orange) Le Mans winner, 600 hp
- Porsche 911 Turbo (light blue metallic)
- Porsche 928 29 km on the odometer
- Ford Model A
- BMW R 100 RS - the Shah's bike, with 692 km on the odometer
- Honda Gold Wing GL1000 (1976) - Empress Farah Diba's bike
- Harley-Davidson WL 750 (1944)

== History ==
After the Iranian Revolution of 1979, Mohammad Reza Shah and his family fled the country and left behind most of their possessions. Mohammad Reza Shah was famous for his love of sports cars. Prior to the inauguration of the Museum in 2001, run mainly by private initiative of Iranian car enthusiasts, a small portion of the remaining 1200 cars were recovered and put into the Museum to display to the public.

== See also ==
- Ministry of Cultural Heritage, Tourism and Handicrafts
- Safir Office Machines Museum
- List of museums in Iran
