= Rolls-Royce Phantom III =

Ultra-luxury flagship automobile in its third generation

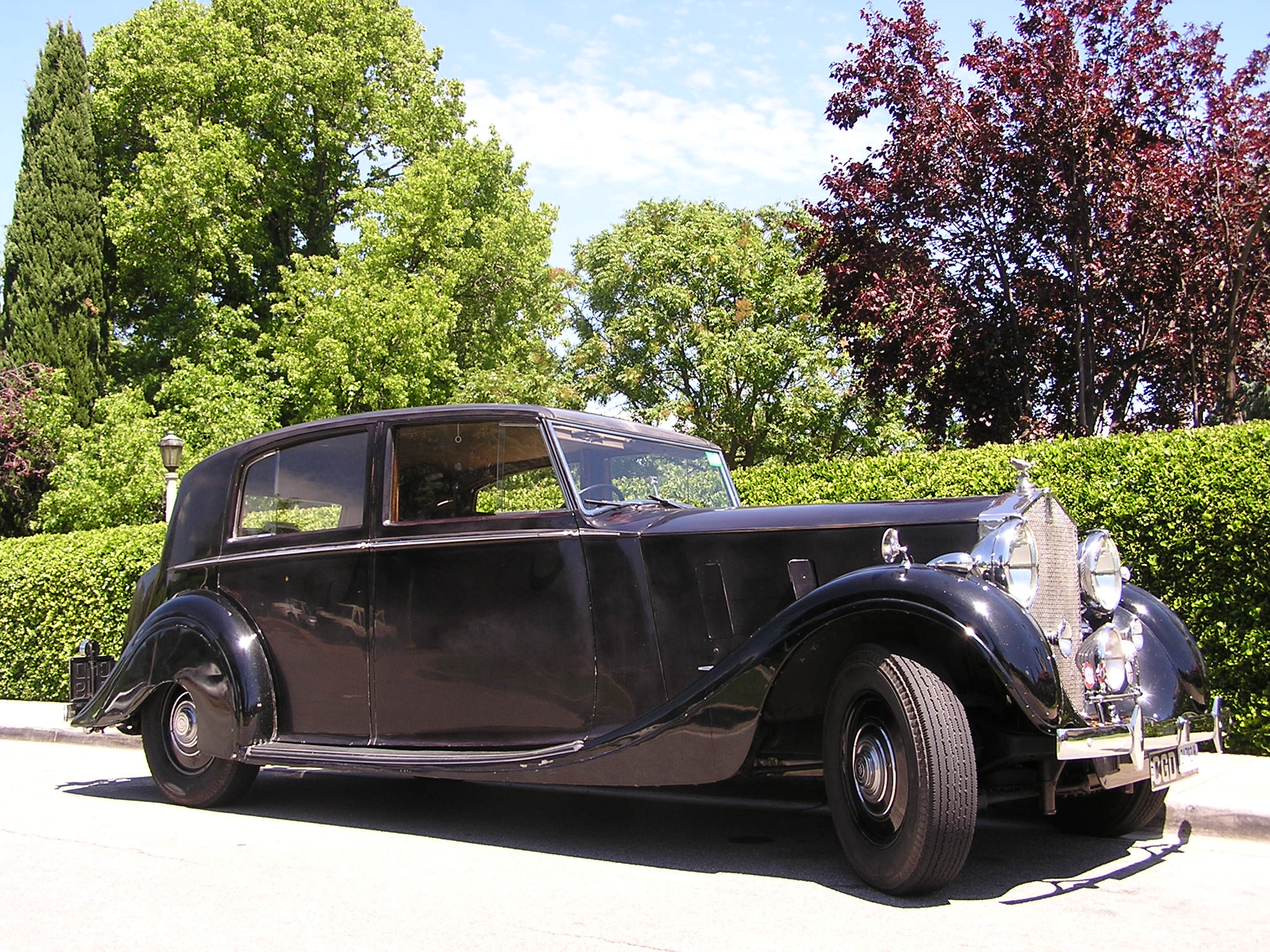

Overview
- Manufacturer: Rolls-Royce Ltd
- Production: 1936–1939; 727 produced

Body and chassis
- Class: Luxury car

Powertrain
- Engine: 7338 cc (447 cubic inches) V12
- Transmission: 4-speed manual

Dimensions
- Wheelbase: 142 in (3607 mm)
- Curb weight: 1,837 kg (4,050 lb) (chassis only); 3,500 kg (7,700 lb) (approx - with Barker & Co 4 door body)

Chronology
- Predecessor: Phantom II
- Successor: Silver Wraith; Phantom IV

The Rolls-Royce Phantom III was the final large pre-war Rolls-Royce. Introduced in 1936, it replaced the Phantom II, and it was the only V12 Rolls-Royce until the 1998 introduction of the Silver Seraph. It is the first of the three V12-powered Rolls-Royce Phantoms, with the 2003-2017 Rolls-Royce Phantom VII and 2018- Rolls-Royce Phantom VIII being the other two. 727 V12 Phantom III chassis were constructed from 1936 to 1939, and approximately 650 have survived. Although chassis production ceased in 1939 (with one final chassis being built in 1940), cars were still being bodied and delivered in 1940 and 1941. Though the rolling chassis was completed in 1941, the last car was not delivered with a body to its owner until 1947. The Phantom III was the last car that Henry Royce worked on – he died, aged 70, a year into the Phantom III's development.

== Background ==
In 1934, with Rolls-Royce newly in control of W.O. Bentley's firm and looking to leap forward in engine development, the company acquired 1934 Cadillac V-16 #5100024, and shipped it to England for study. Bentley himself spent more than 10,000 miles behind its wheel across Europe and came away impressed. His evaluation fed directly into the next wave of Rolls-Royce engine designs and development of Phantom III.

== Engineering ==
The III is powered by an aluminium-alloy V12 engine of 447in³ (7.32L), having a bore of 3.25 inches (82.5 mm) and a stroke of 4.5 inches (114.3 mm). It is a pushrod engine with overhead valves operated by a single camshaft in the valley between the cylinder banks. Early cars had hydraulic tappets or a unique system of eccentric bushings in each rocker that was actuated by a small hydraulic piston; the eccentric bushing ensured zero valve-lash at the rocker/valve interface. This system was changed to solid adjustable tappets in 1938. The Phantom III is unusual for its twin ignition systems, with two distributors, two coils and 24 spark plugs. A twin SU electric pump provides petrol. Wire wheels are fitted as standard, but many cars carry Ace wheel discs, which were fitted to improve cosmetics and to reduce the time taken to clean the wheels after use.

The car features onboard jacking and a one-shot chassis lubrication system, operated by a lever inside the driver's compartment. Independent front suspension by a coil spring-based system is complemented by a carryover semi-elliptical spring unit in the rear. The car has a 4-speed manual transmission with synchromesh on gears 2, 3 and 4. An overdrive gearbox was added in 1938, the ratio change being contained in the gearbox rather than in a separate unit. The car has 4-wheel servo-assisted brakes applied by cable (using a servo made under licence from Hispano-Suiza). The radiator shell is of Staybrite steel.

The sheer bulk of the car is reflected in its performance figures. An example tested in 1938 by The English Autocar magazine returned a top speed of 87½ mph (140 km/h) and a 0 - 60 mph (0 – 96 km/h) time of 16.8 seconds. The overall fuel consumption quoted from that road test was 28 litres per 100 kilometres (10 mpg_{‑imp}; 8.4 mpg_{‑US}).

== Bodywork ==
Only the chassis and mechanical parts were made by Rolls-Royce. Car bodies were constructed and fitted by coachbuilders selected by owners or dealers, who might have cars built for showroom stock. Some famous coachbuilders who produced bodies for Rolls-Royce cars are Barker, Park Ward, Mulliner, Hooper and Thrupp & Maberly. Body types and limousines included saloons, coupés, and convertibles. A handful of used cars have been converted to hearses and shooting brakes.

== Film and television appearances ==
In 1964, 25 years after the end of production, the villainous Auric Goldfinger (played by Gert Fröbe) was driven by chauffeur Oddjob in a black and yellow Phantom III in the James Bond film Goldfinger, knowing that its great strength would be able to hold the weight of the vast amounts of gold that he smuggled around Europe.

== Gallery ==
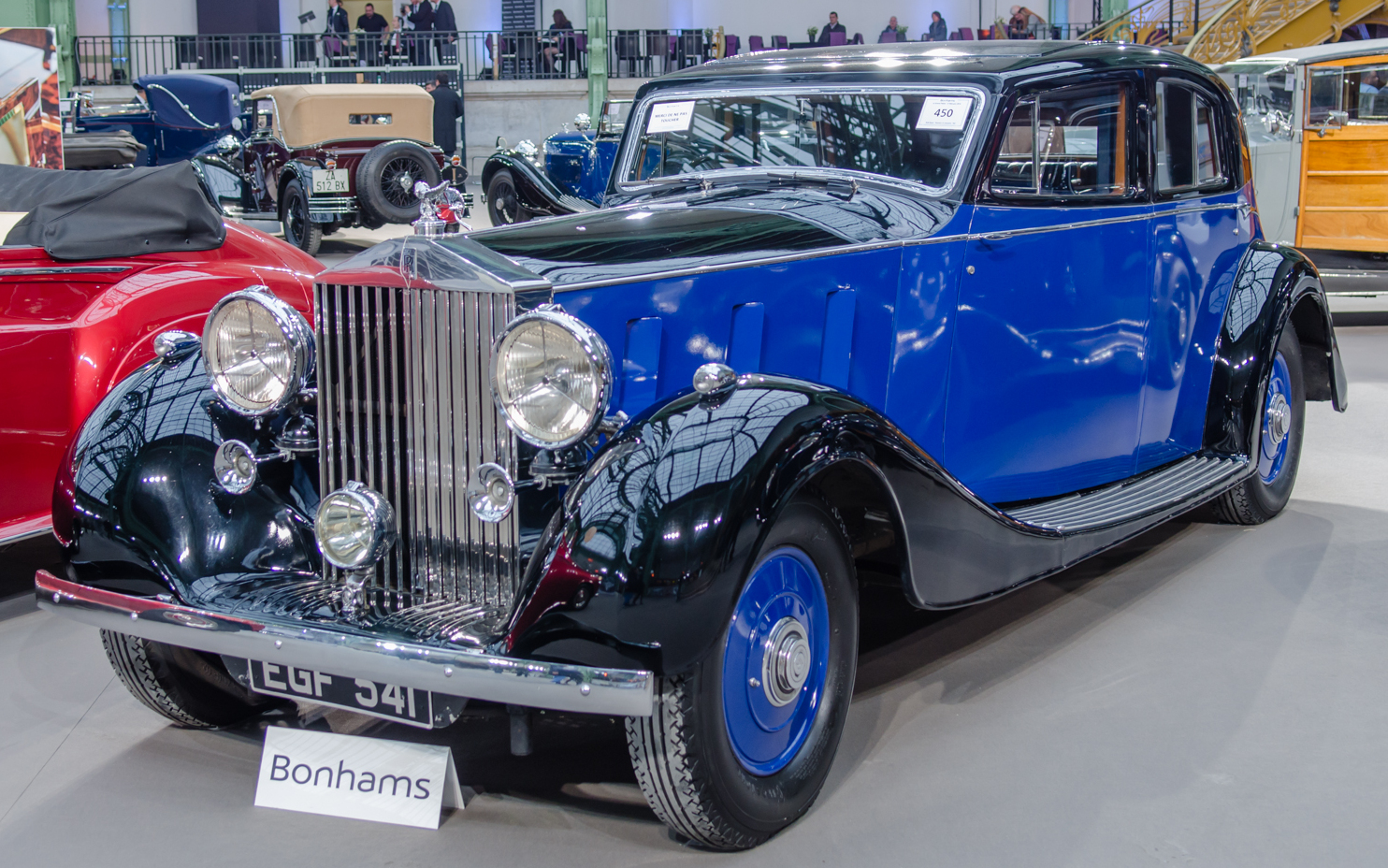
Limousine, 1937, by Arthur Mulliner of Northampton

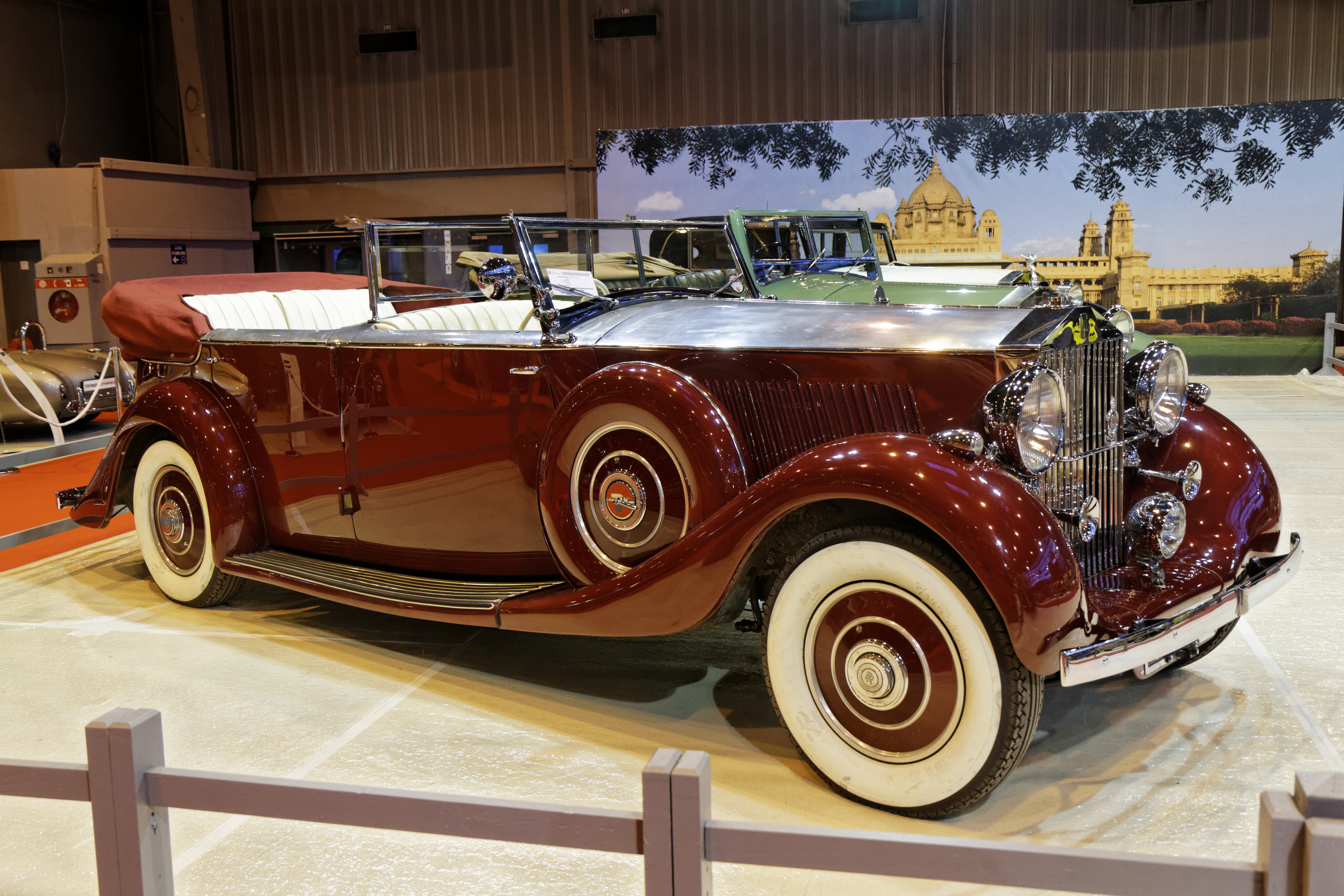
Dual-cowl open tourer, 1937
by Barker & Co

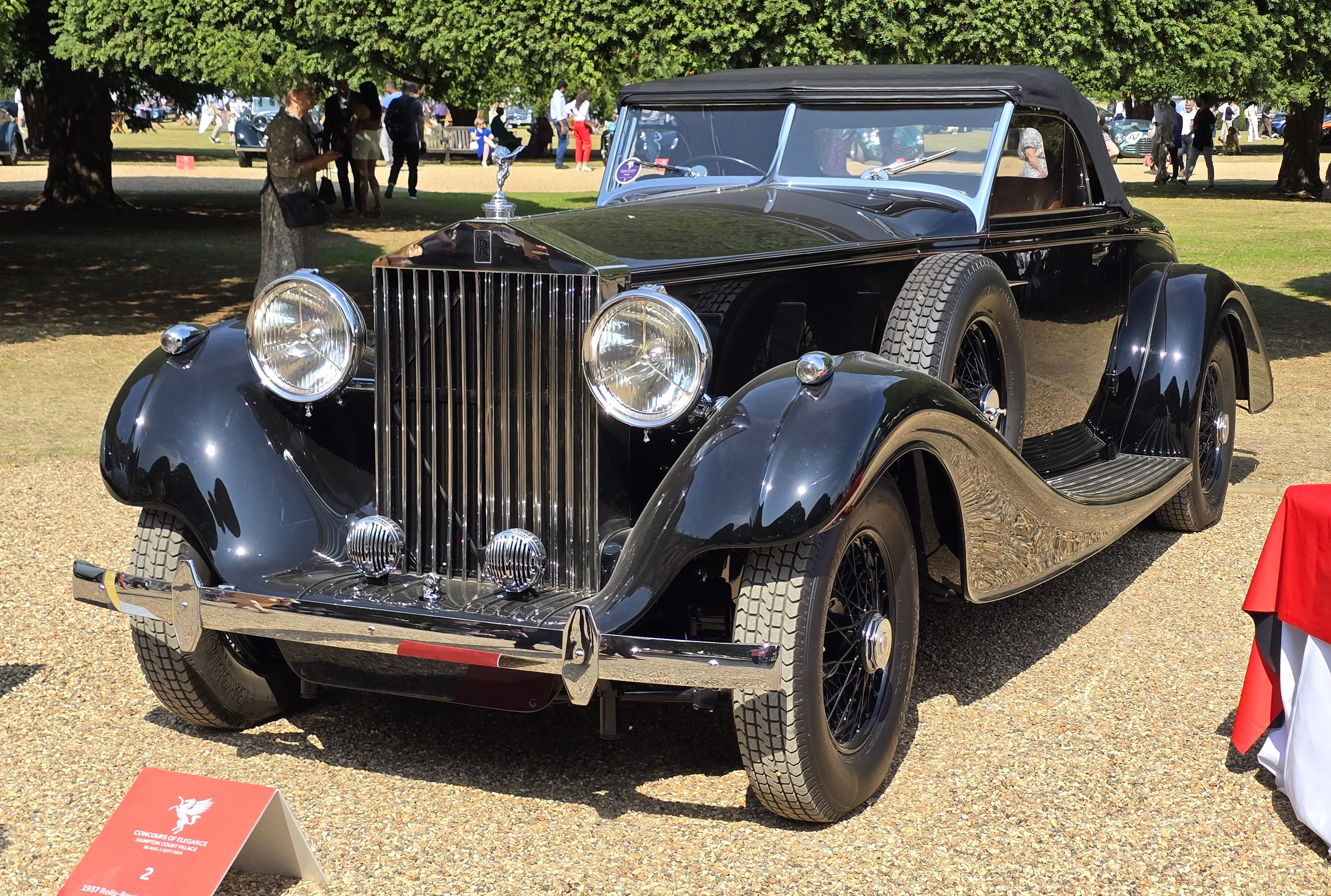
1937 Rolls-Royce Phantom III

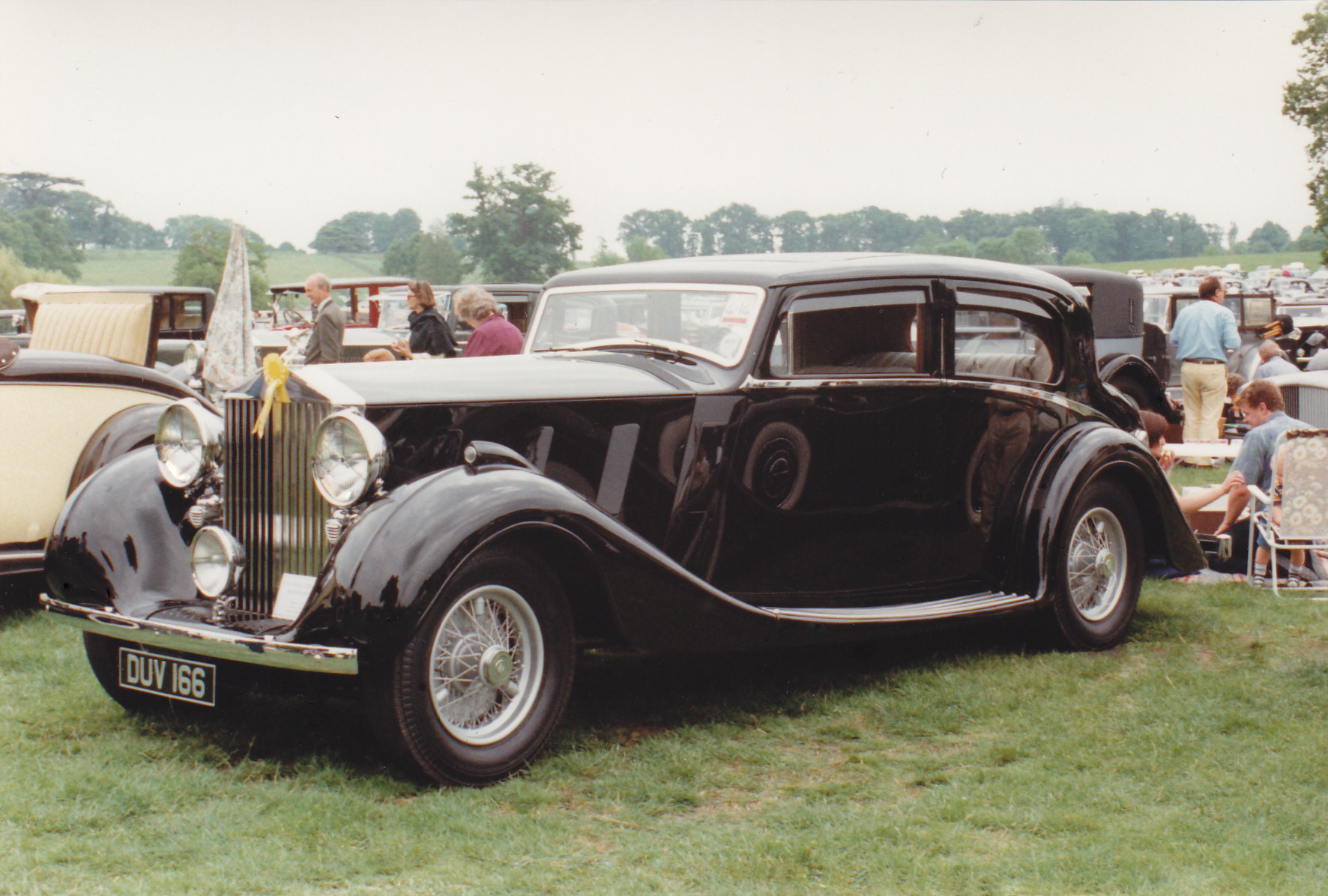
1936 Rolls-Royce Phantom III, #3AX143, by Arthur Mulliner

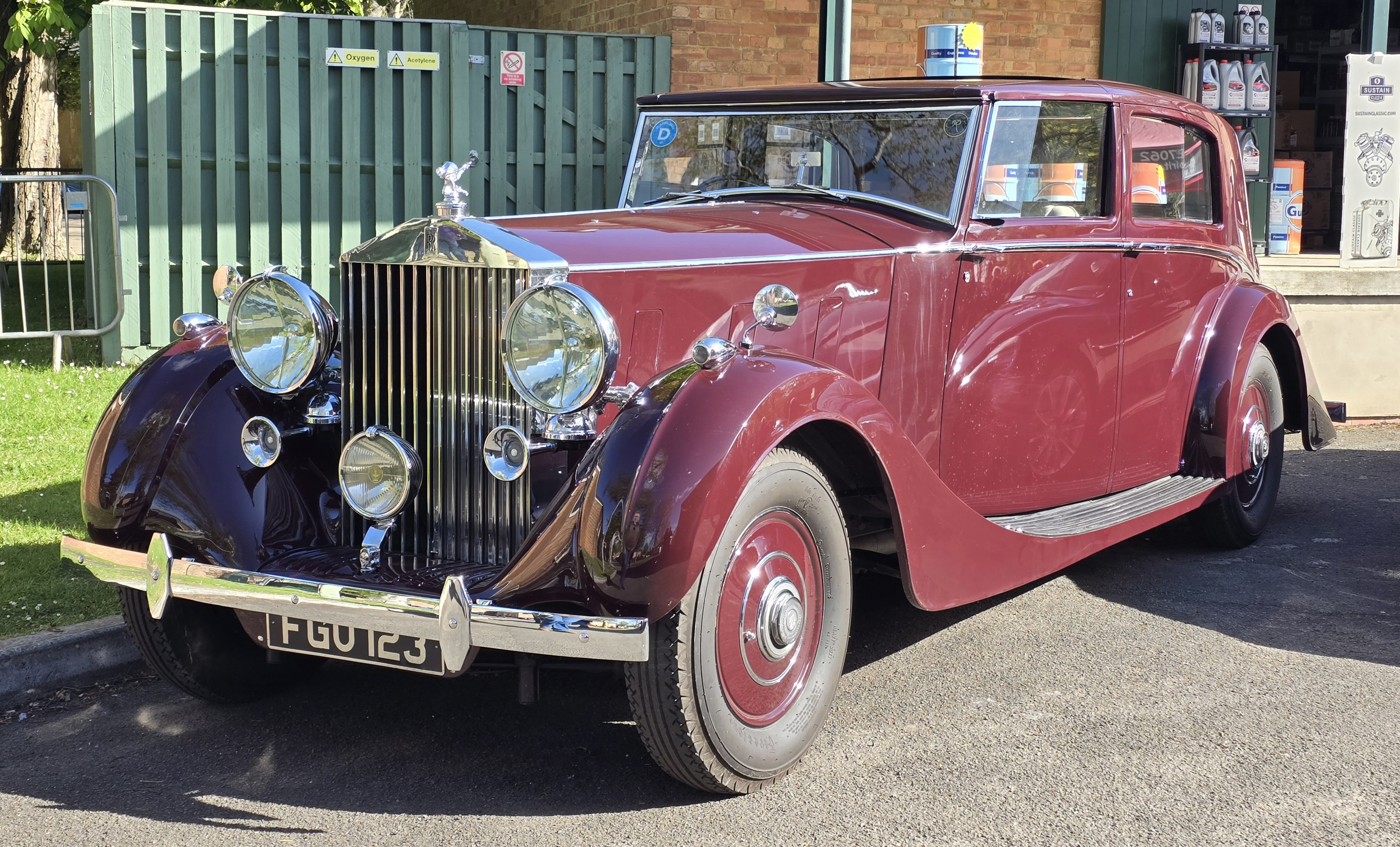
1938 Rolls-Royce Wraith Saloon by Thrupp & Maberly

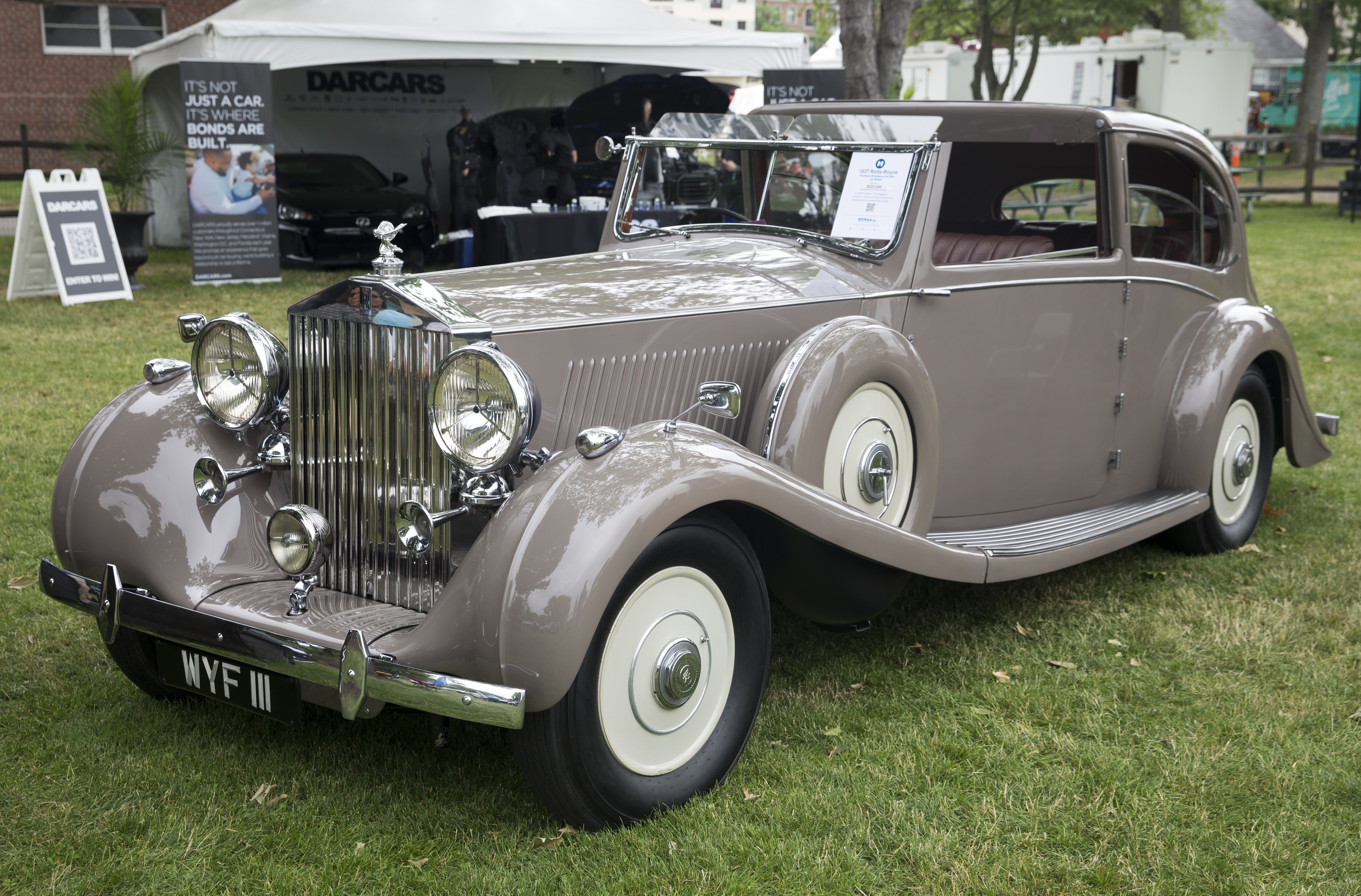
1937 Rolls-Royce Phantom III coupe, by Barker

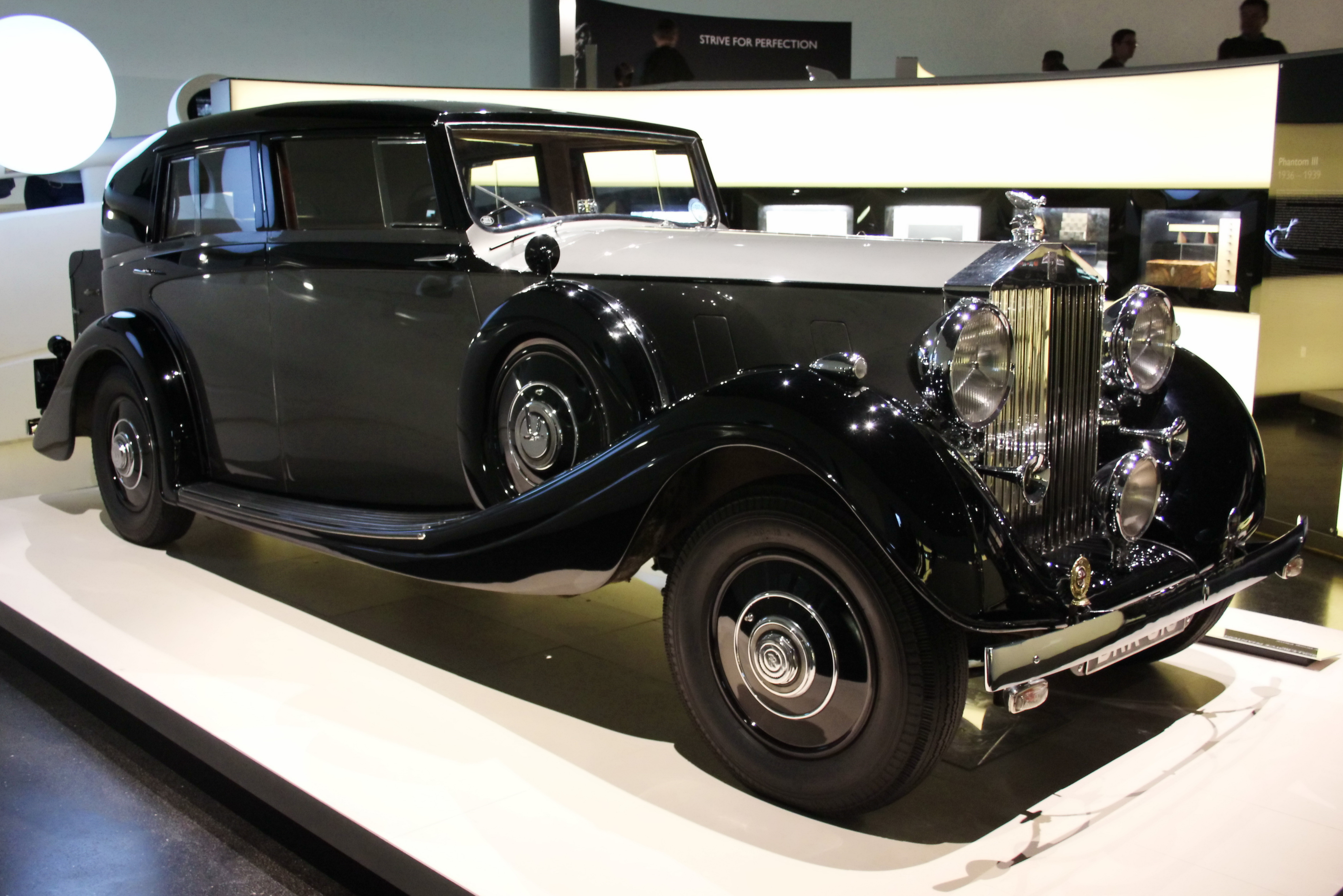
Rolls-Royce Phantom III chassis 3AX101 limousine, by Gurney Nutting
