= Rolls-Royce Phantom IV =

Ultra-luxury flagship automobile in its fourth generation

- The first Rolls-Royce Phantom IV on its inaugural journey as a State Car

Overview
- Manufacturer: Rolls-Royce Limited
- Production: 1950–1956; 18 vehicles
- Assembly: United Kingdom: Belper and Crewe

Body and chassis
- Body style: 4-door sedan
- Layout: Longitudinal front-engine, rear-wheel drive
- Related: Silver Wraith

Powertrain
- Engine: 5.7 L I8 (first 15 vehicles); 6.5 L I8 (final 3 vehicles)
- Transmission: 4-speed manual gearbox (4-speed automatic gearbox standard from 1954)

Dimensions
- Wheelbase: 3,683 mm (145.0 in)
- Length: 5,765.8 mm (227.0 in)
- Width: 1,955.8 mm (77.0 in)
- Height: 1,879.6 mm (74.0 in) (Data corresponding to the first P. IV varies depending on each unit and/or type of coachwork)

Chronology
- Predecessor: Phantom III
- Successor: Phantom V

The Rolls-Royce Phantom IV is a British automobile produced by Rolls-Royce. Only eighteen were made between 1950 and 1956, sold only to buyers whom Rolls-Royce considered worthy of the distinction: the British royal family and heads of state. Sixteen are known to still exist in museums as well as in public and private collections.

== Characteristics ==
Rolls-Royce broke with their earlier decision to cease production of the series of "big" Rolls-Royce Phantoms after the end of World War II. The Phantom IV chassis differed from those of the shorter, production post-War models, the Silver Wraith and the Bentley Mark VI; apart from a larger size and an engine with increased capacity and power, they have an additional cross-member at the centre of the cruciform bracing and 10-stud road wheel mountings.

The engine was a derivative of the 8-cylinder rationalized B range of petrol engines (formed by four, six and straight eight). Specifically it was a refined version of a B80, the last three of a B81, both used in military and commercial vehicles. The IV is the only Rolls-Royce motorcar to be fitted with a straight-8 engine, which was powerful but could also run long distances at a very low speed, an important feature for ceremonial and parade cars.

All examples of this exclusive series were bodied by independent coachbuilders, and most of their bonnets surmounted by the kneeling version of the Spirit of Ecstasy, which had been unveiled in 1934 and used in various other models.

== History ==
In July 1938, Rolls-Royce had to publish in the motoring press an announcement denying that the Phantom III fabrication would be interrupted. The following was published on 19 July 1938 in the British magazine The Motor:

The company wish to deny the rumour that the Phantom III is to be discontinued and replaced with another model having an 8-cylinder or other engine.

However, a project had been initiated in 1937 to rein in the manufacturing costs of the Rolls-Royce and Bentley (acquired by Rolls-Royce in 1931) motor car chassis. This involved the development of a Rationalized Range of cars that shared as many common components of the chassis as possible. As implementation of this rationalization plan, several prototypes were made. One of these, chassis 30-G-VII, was fitted with a large Park Ward seven-seater limousine body and was called Silver Wraith 80, then Silver Phantom, though it soon became known as Big Bertha. This was the genesis of the Phantom IV.

Likewise, in 1939 and before the starting of hostilities, another straight-eight powered experimental automobile tested during and after World War II was a special Bentley Mark V, chassis 11-B-V, fitted with a bored-out 6.3 litre eight-cylinder engine. Although the official Experimental Department name for this car was Comet, its scorching performance earned it the fond epithet Scalded Cat. This unit in particular would later play a key role in the decision of creating the Phantom IV. Indeed, the Prince Philip, Duke of Edinburgh heard about the Bentley nicknamed Scalded Cat in 1948 and asked if he might test it out. He enjoyed this experimental car immensely and drove it for considerable distances. When he returned it, he apparently murmured about how nice it would be to have a car with performance in the Royal Mews.

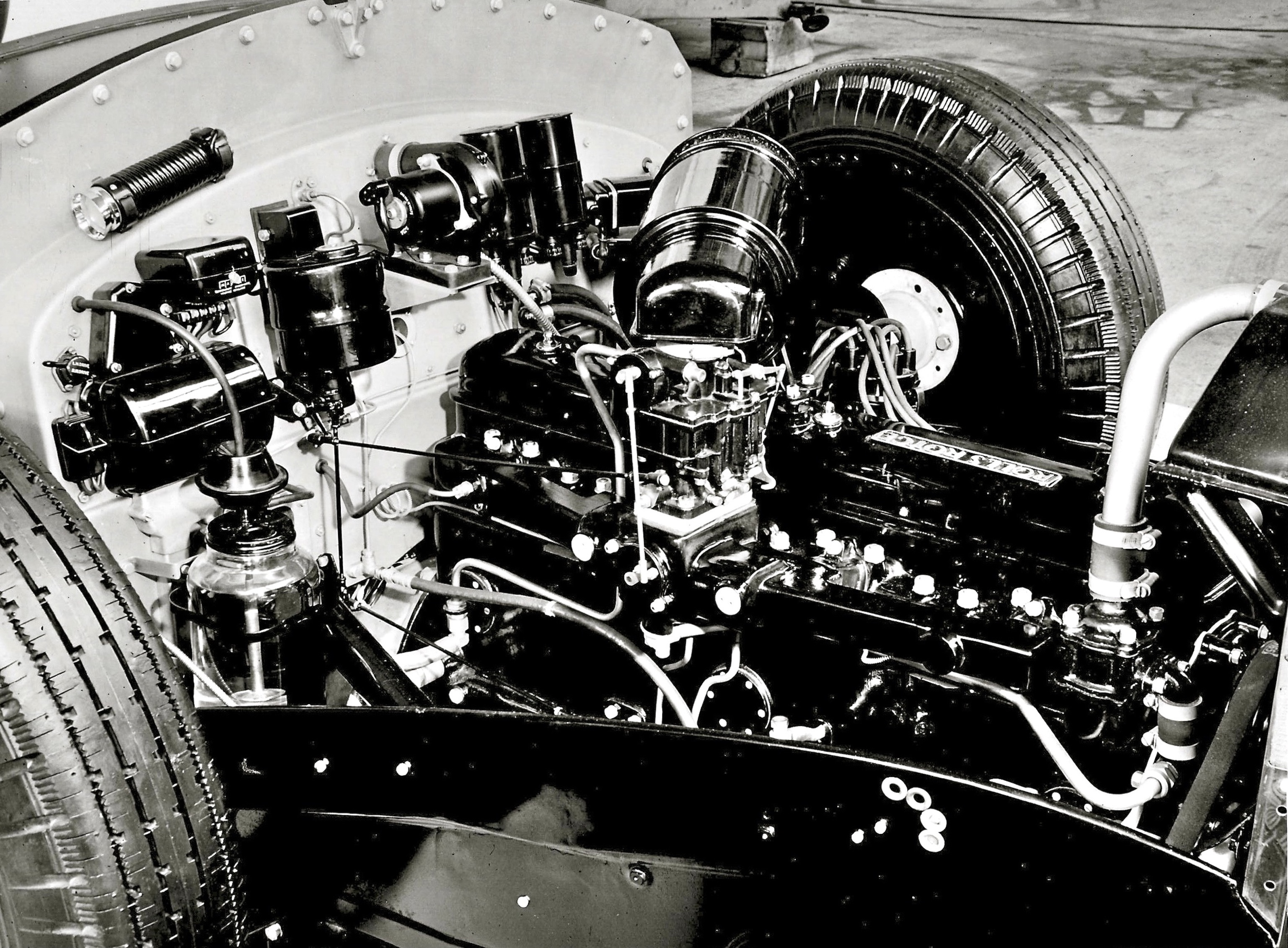
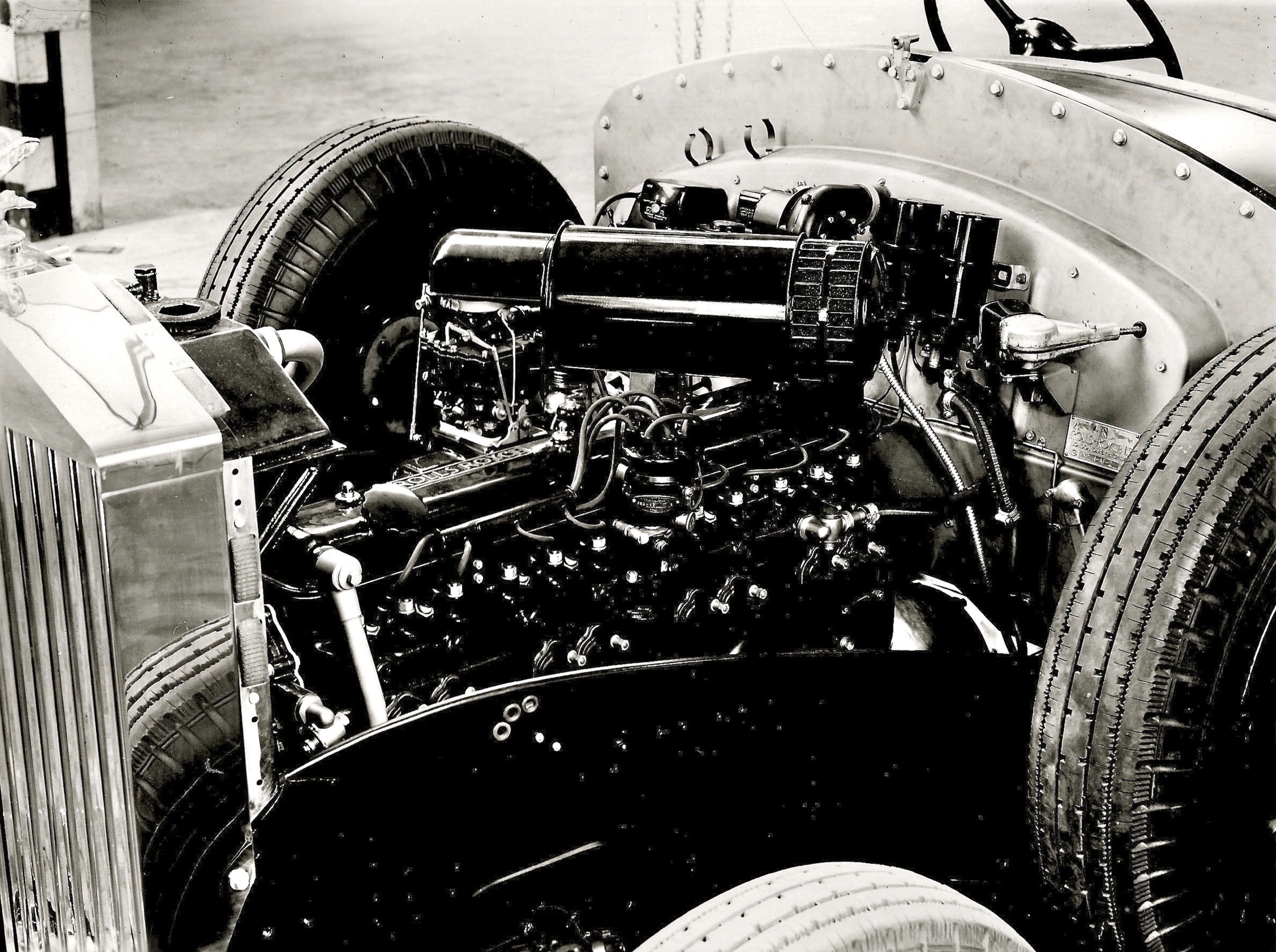
Two 1949 photographs of the straight-eight engine in the first chassis

On 15 November 1948, not long after Prince Philip had driven the aforementioned automobile, an order came through for a Rolls-Royce motor car for Princess Elizabeth and Prince Philip. They placed the order through The Car Mart, Ltd., RR official retailers in London. Such a vehicle would have to meet their official needs, which meant it must be a limousine. It would also have to have good performance, since the Prince wished to drive it himself. The car would be the first Rolls-Royce in the stables. It was originally planned to be the only Phantom IV, a strictly one-off piece.

Rolls-Royce, aware that Daimler had held the royal warrant to provide motor cars since 1900, was very keen to ensure that the car was the best there had ever been, and a great deal of hand work was lavished on the construction of the chassis. The board members had earlier considered making a replacement for the pre-war Phantom III, but they were wary that such a large and expensive car might not have a market in the weak post-war economy.

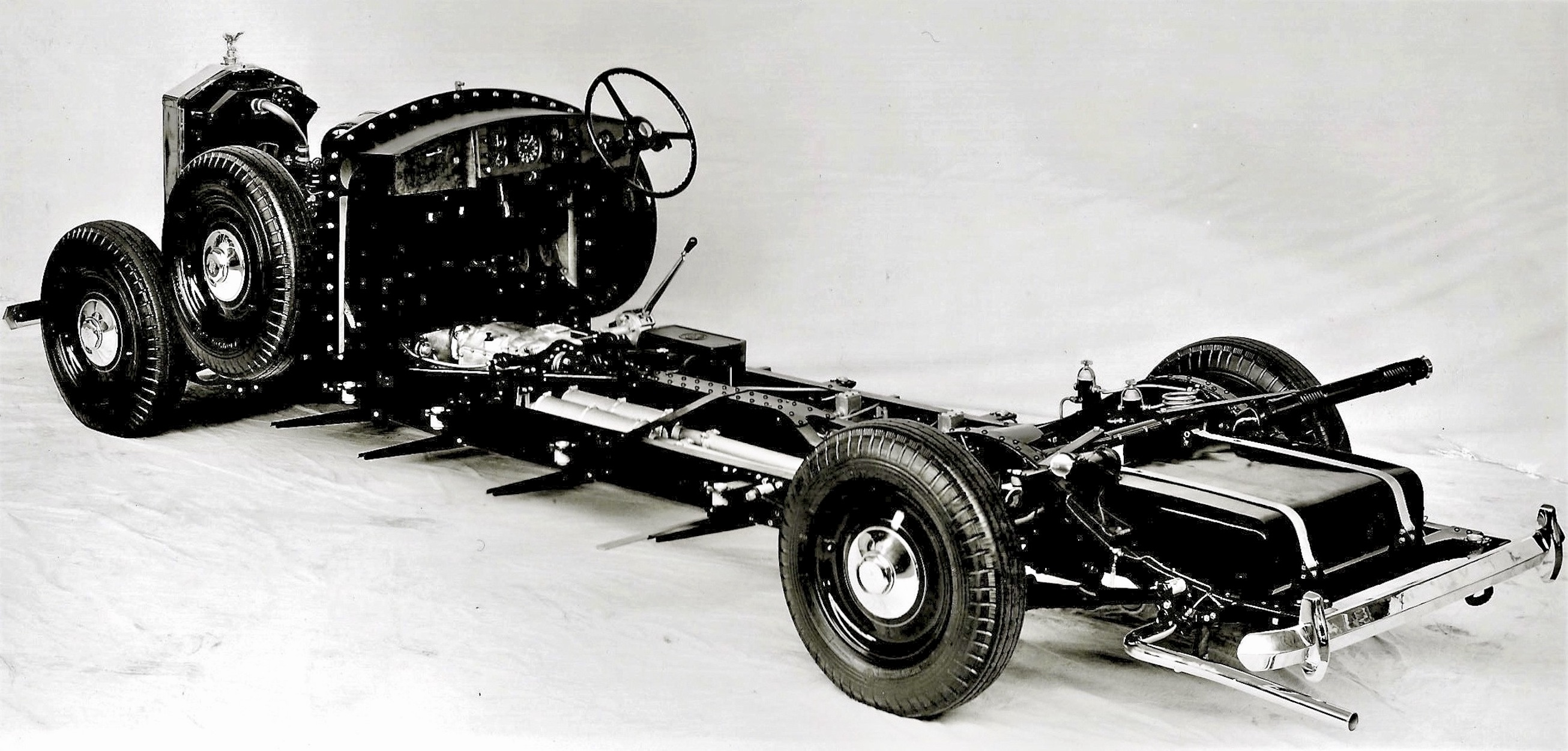
The first rolling chassis completed, 1949

Design and production of the first chassis of the new model was not at the Crewe factory, but at the experimental Clan Foundry at Belper, which had been the home of the motor car branch during the Second World War. The Experimental Department still continued there until the closure of Clan Foundry in 1950, when it was finally transferred to Crewe. The remaining seventeen chassis were made at the Experimental Department workshop at the Crewe factory. The very small numbers of the Phantom IV meant that building them with the other models would have been disruptive to the latters' production.

The chassis 4AF2 was built under the code-name Nabha and when completed was dispatched to Mulliner on 20 July 1949 for erection of the body. Mulliner had previously submitted their design for review and approval by the Duke of Edinburgh, and the coachbuilder’s proposal drawing was accepted. Prince Philip visited the workshops more than once while it was being built. The body took almost a year to build and the car was finally delivered to The Car Mart on 6 July 1950, after some 230 miles of testing by Rolls-Royce at the Motor Industry Research Association facilities and on the road. Its delivery was accompanied by a public announcement stating the Phantom IV had been "designed to the special order of Their Royal Highnesses, the Princess Elizabeth and the Duke of Edinburgh".

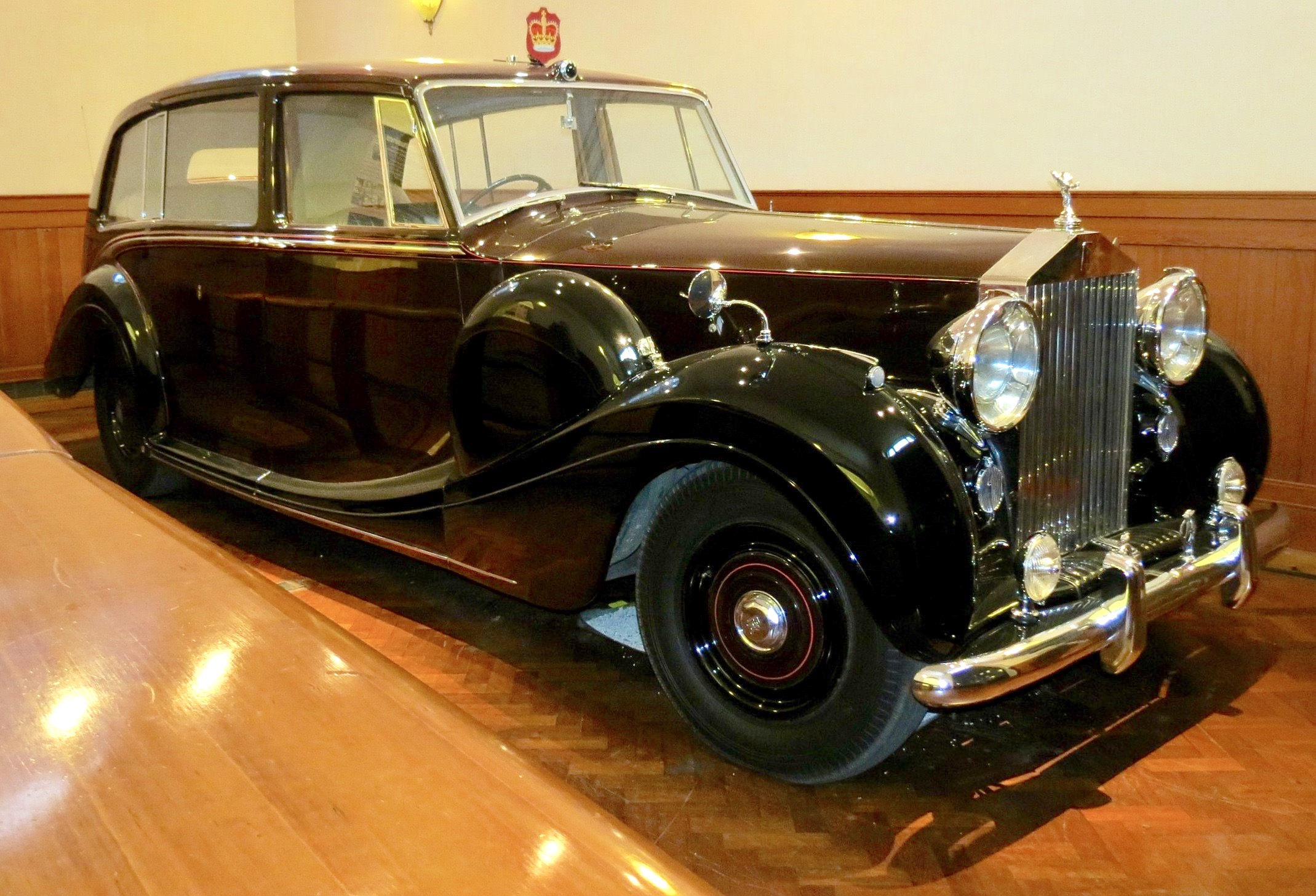
The first car built, repainted in royal claret and black in 1952. Royal Mews, London

As the car was privately owned when delivered to the couple, it was painted Valentine green (deep green with a slight blue secondary hue) with red belt-line striping. The limousine became an official state car of the United Kingdom upon Princess Elizabeth's accession to the throne in 1952; as such, it was repainted in the sovereign's colour scheme of royal claret and black.

This car remains in the Royal Mews and is still used occasionally for royal and state events. For example, it was used at the wedding of Prince William, Duke of Cambridge and Catherine Middleton in 2011 to carry Prince Charles and Camilla, Duchess of Cornwall, from Clarence House to Westminster Abbey. In 2018, it brought Meghan Markle to St George's Chapel, Windsor Castle, for her wedding to Prince Harry. In 2022, it transported the new king, Charles III, and Queen Camilla from Buckingham Palace to Westminster Hall and RAF Northolt.

=== The Spanish order ===
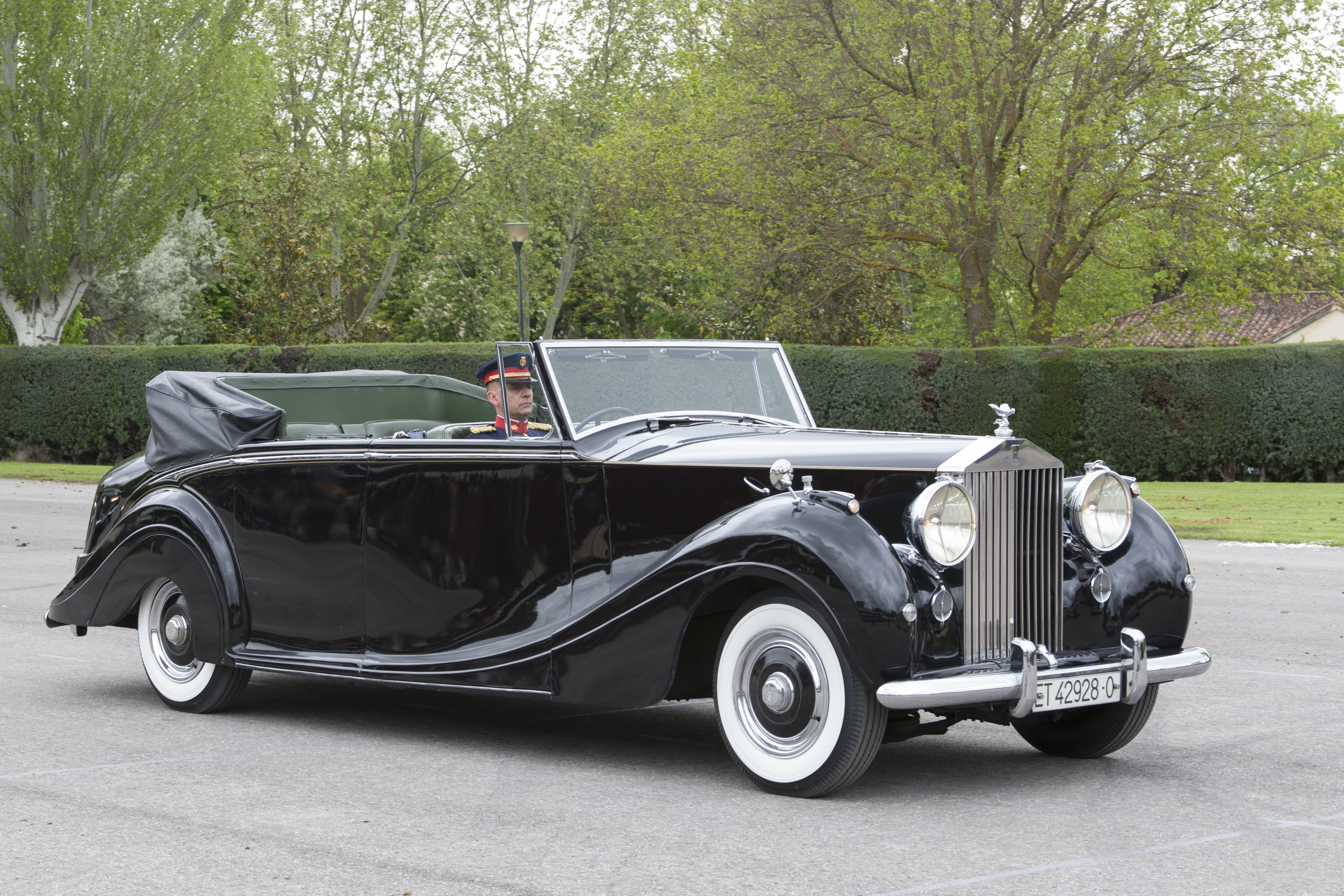
Chassis 4AF18, one of only three open bodies made

On 18 October 1948, Crewe received an order from the Government of Spain for three armoured cars for the use of Generalissimo Francisco Franco: two with limousine bodies and an open all-weather body; this one intended to replace a 1938 Hispano-Suiza J12 with Carrosserie Vanvooren body. While the Phantom IV model was not specified in the order, or even known outside the company at that time, it was decided that the best way to cope with the huge additional weight would be to build the three cars as Phantom IVs, rather than over-burden the Silver Wraith chassis. Especially since the Foreign Office suggested that Crewe could not turn down the order.

The passengers were to be immune from a Mauser bullet fired at ten paces, so W. A. Robotham recommended a body from Mulliner's of Chiswick, which "had many satisfied customers among the more unpopular rulers of the world". A mission to Mulliner's of Army officers required glass one and three quarters of an inch thick and armour plate. The armour plate was to be almost half an inch thick, and the large floor area required would make the completed weight of the cars over three and a half tons, which would overstress the wheels and gearbox on Spain's main roads. Some years later when holidaying there, Robotham inspected the cars; the brigadier in charge of the garage praised them and said they were used frequently. The speedometers only showed less than 2,000 km but "they were taken by train and only driven for the actual inspections and processions".

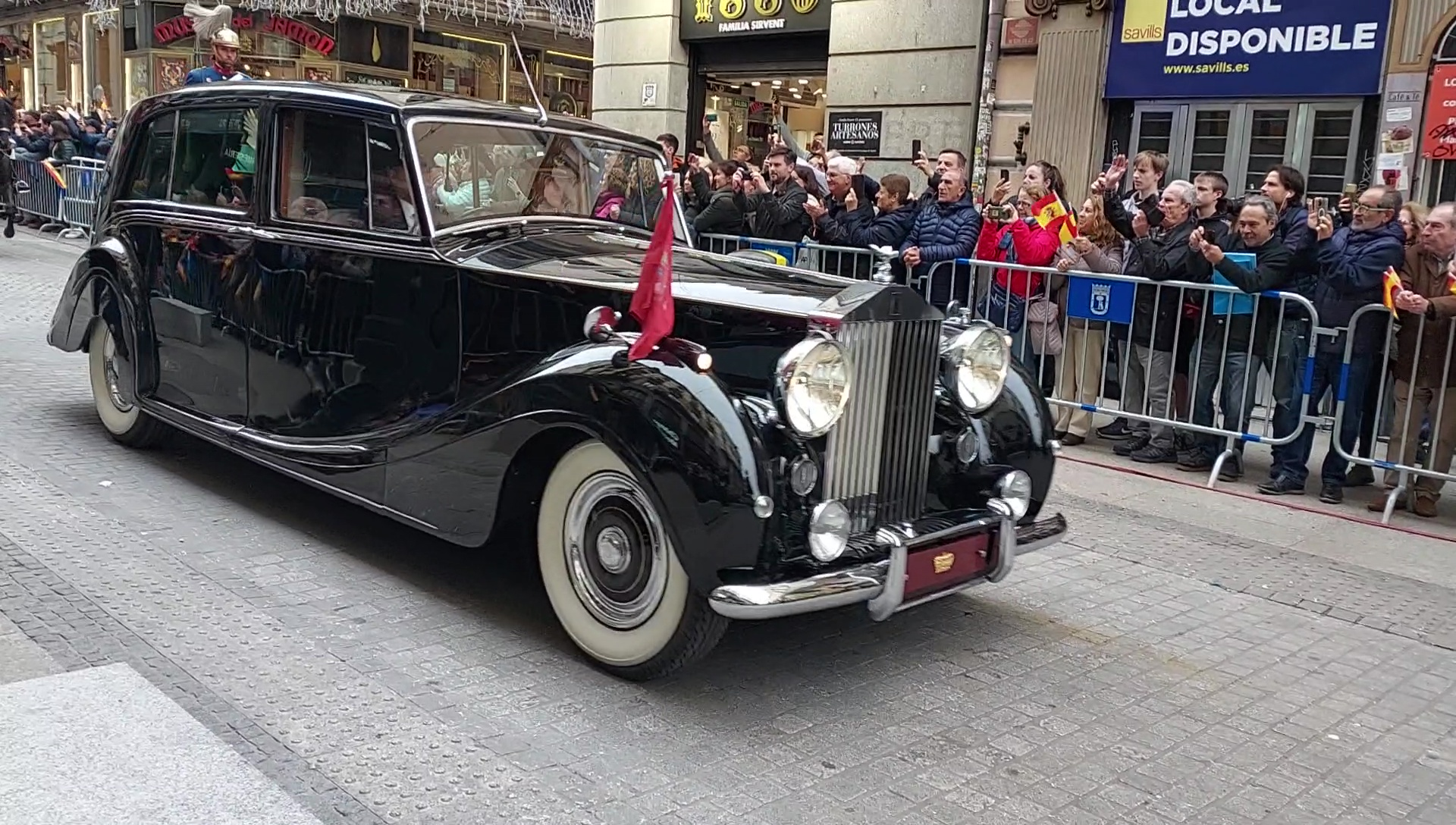
One of the two limousines carrying King Felipe VI of Spain and Queen Letizia to an official act in October 2023

Without intending it, the Government of Spain's triple order in October 1948, along with the later Princess Elizabeth and Duke's commission in November that year, helped to give a decisive impulse to the existence of this model, as suggested by Martin Bennett in his book Rolls-Royce & Bentley: The Crewe Years and the number 9 September 1990 of the British magazine Classic Cars. All these three historical vehicles have always been property of the Spanish Army and are still in ceremonial use for the Spanish royal family and for heads of state on official visit in Spain, using one of the two limousines.

=== The "Royalty and Heads of State only" policy ===
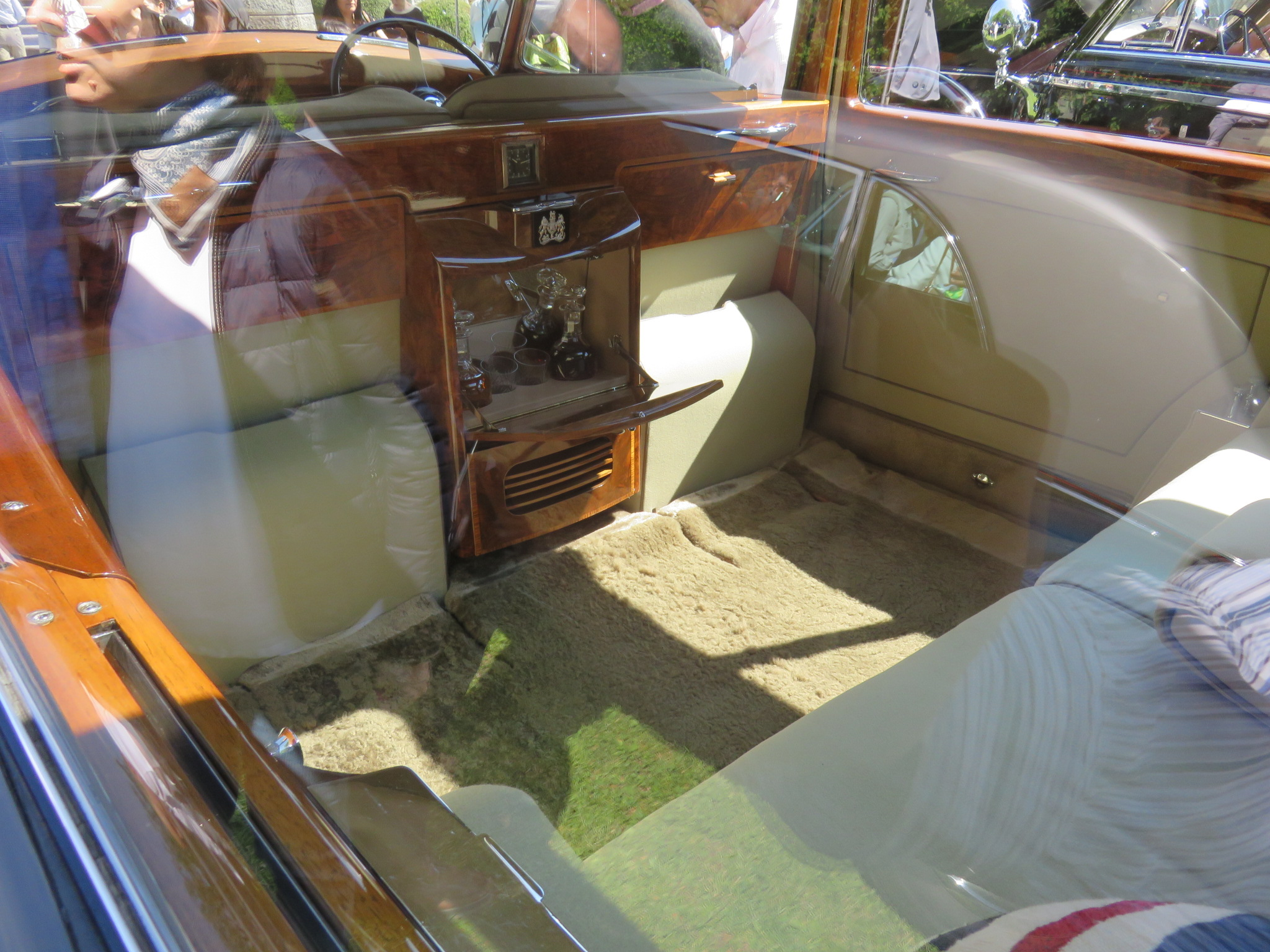
The back compartment of 4BP7 (Princess Margaret's car). Featuring a division, two tip-up seats and folding shelves, cabinet, timepiece, etc.

It is not known exactly when the "Royalty and Heads of State only" policy was decided, nor indeed whether in fact there was such an explicit company policy. It is known though, that a boardroom decision was reached that it would be impractical to attempt to build more than three Phantom IVs per year. It is also clear that no private customer other than royalty and heads of state ever took delivery of a Phantom IV. Nevertheless, a considerable number of coachbuilder's drawings exist of proposed Phantom IVs that were never built.

A number of these are proposals by coachbuilders for chassis which in the event were bodied by other coachbuilders. Others were proposed but not built at all. Most are linked to a specific customer's name, such as the King Farouk, the Maharajas of Baroda and Mysore, as well as the Americans Briggs Cunningham and James Melton. It is evident that certain customers outside of the Royalty and Heads of State category believed that a Phantom IV would be available for purchase. Just how, or if, the news was broken to those customers that the firm would not supply a chassis for their proposed cars, or why they opted for other models, is open to conjecture.

In 1956, the model was discontinued, by that time appropriate bodies for state use had been built on Silver Wraiths, which worked well for the factory, making dedicated Phantom IV production no longer necessary. In 1952, the cost of the Phantom IV chassis was $10,000 (£3,500) and with a limousine body, $20,000 (£7,000), a huge price premium but perhaps still not enough to allow a profit on the small number built (eighteen made, seventeen sold). However, its role of expanding the prestige of Rolls-Royce was achieved.

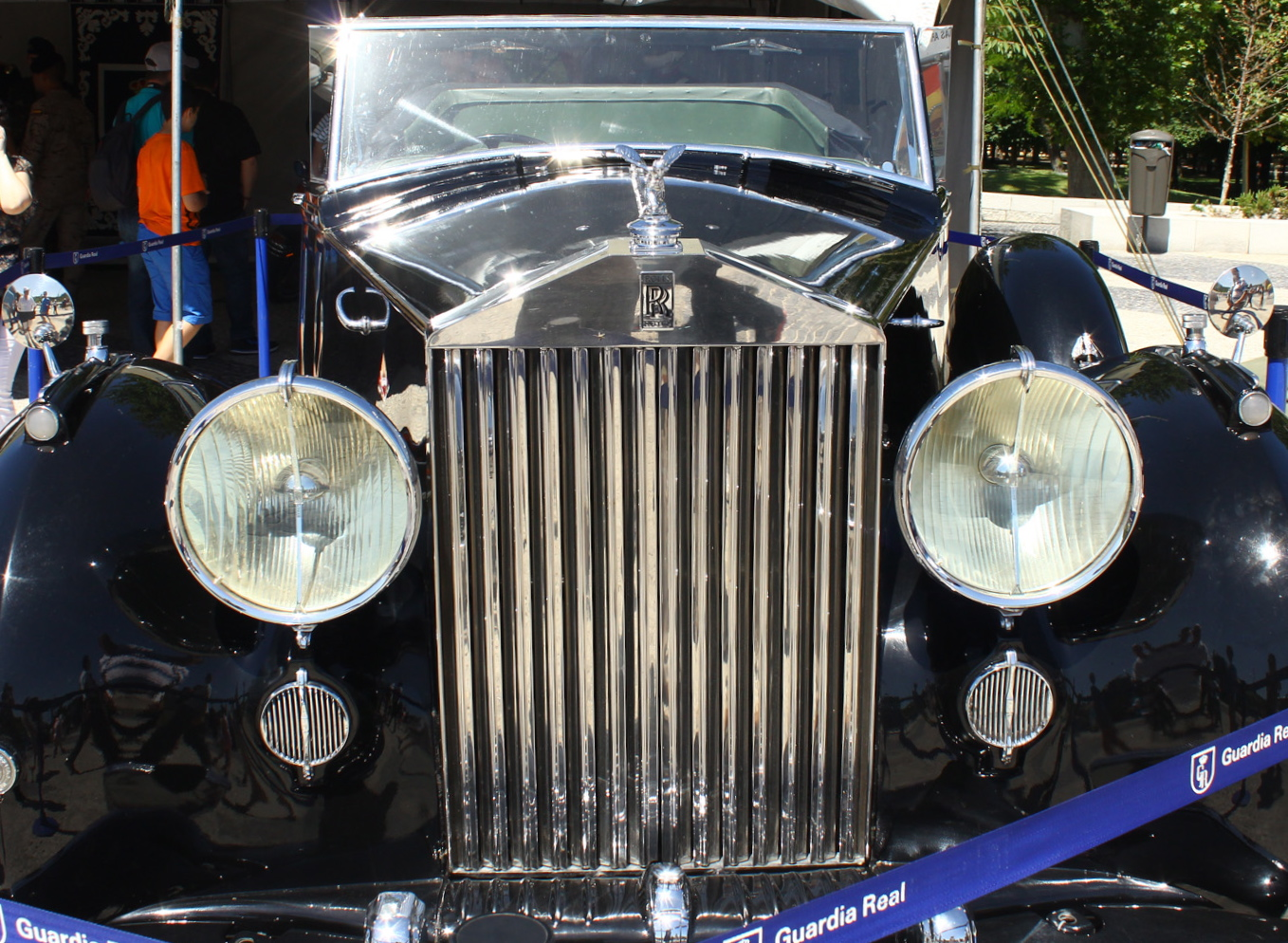
Chassis 4AF18: Two big Lucas R-100 headlights flank the emblematic Parthenon-style radiator. Shell top and front look dead flat but are actually a few thousandths convex, so they will look flat, in accordance with the design principles (known as entasis) used by the ancient Greeks in that temple.

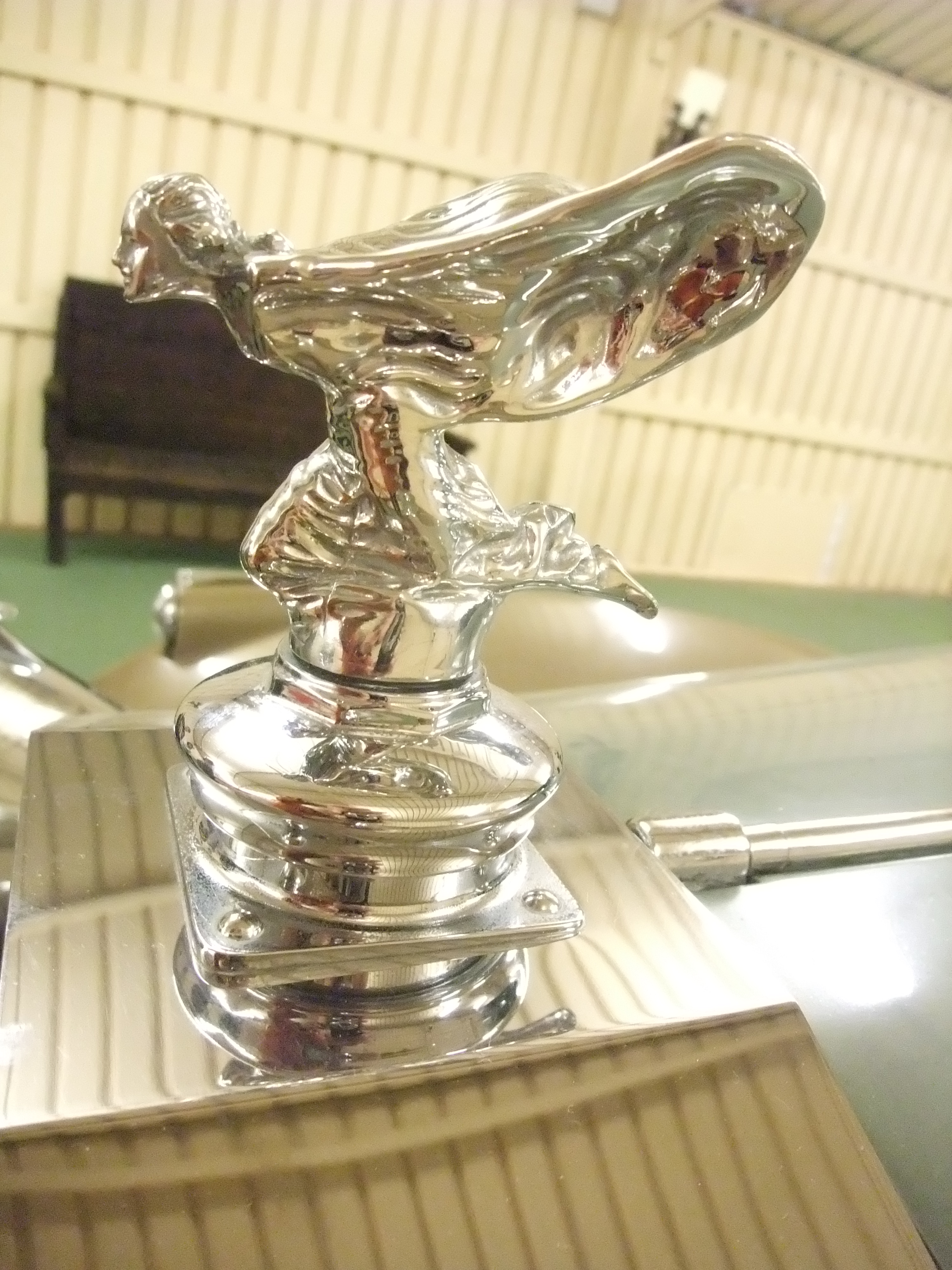
Chassis 4CS4: Kneeling Spirit of Ecstasy (1934–1939 and 1946–1956) mounted on most of the radiators, except chassis 4BP7 & 4CS6

== Table of all 18 models ==
Chassis	Engine no.	Original owner / user	Coachwork	Current exterior	Current interior	Last known owner / location	Picture
4AF2	P1A	Queen Elizabeth II of the United Kingdom	H. J. Mulliner; Limousine, 7-seater No. 5034; Design 7162	Royal Claret and Black	Front: Blue Leather, later redone in dark blue cloth. Rear: Grey cloth	State Car, Royal Mews, London, 2022	
4AF2	Ordered as a personal car for the then Princess Elizabeth and the Duke of Edinburgh.; Fitted with a specially modified driver's seat in case the Duke of Edinburgh wished to drive.; 'Super silent' brake discs.; As with other State and royal cars of the United Kingdom, the mascot displayed on the car depends on the occupant of the car and where the car is being used.; Nicknamed Nabha, to maintain the privacy of the source of the order.; The car has exclusively been used in the UK, save for one trip in 1977 to Germany.						
4AF2	Delivery took place on 6 July 1950.; In 1952, it was adopted as a State and royal cars of the United Kingdom and repainted – from Valentine Green with a Red pinstripe – to the Royal livery of Royal Claret and Black, seen on Royal Daimlers to that point.; On 10 April 1952, the Queen was driven in this car to her first royal engagement – the presentation of Maundy Money at Westminster Abbey.; In 1955, the car was fitted with an automatic gearbox.; The car has been used by many members of the British royal family for countless high-profile events and State occasions.; Since his accession in 2022, Charles III has used the car frequently. The car is reputed to have been a favoured car of Charles, with him intervening to stop its sale.						
4AF4	P2A	Rolls-Royce	Park Ward; Pick-Up Truck; No. Unknown; Design Unknown	Grey		Dismantled, United Kingdom, 1963	
4AF4	Experimental truck used for the factory.; It wore the vehicle registration plate MMA 562.						
4AF4	The vehicle was delivered on 1 October 1950.; In 1952 was fitted with the B81 engine and automatic gear box.; It was scrapped in the early 1960s.						
4AF6	P3A	Mohammad Reza Pahlavi, Shah of Iran	H. J. Mulliner; Cabriolet; No. 5077; Design 7205	Blue Silver	White Leather	Unknown, Hong Kong? 2014	
4AF6	It was the only Phantom IV to have built-in Silver Dawn type headlamps.						
4AF6	It was delivered on 8 March 1951.; In the mid-1950s, the car was seen in Miami, FL, USA.; The car was returned to Rolls-Royce Ltd in 1959, it is believed because it had proved insufficiently stiff, flexing severely on Iranian roads. The outcome was that the company scrapped it, though the body survives on a Phantom III chassis, which perhaps suggests that the fault lay with the chassis.; The car made its way to the United States in 1982, apparently from Switzerland, still with its metallic blue paint.; As of 2014, the car was reputed to reside in Hong Kong.						
4AF8	P4A	Abdullah III Al-Salim Al-Sabah, Emir of Kuwait	H. J. Mulliner; Limousine, 6 light saloon No. 5153; Design 720	Orange Biscuit over Royal Midnight Blue	Biscuit Leather	Unknown, Italy, 2023	
4AF8	It was not fitted with a division between the front and back seats.						
4AF8	The car was delivered in July 1951.; In 2018, the car turned up in England for sale as a restoration project.; As of 2023, the car resides in Italy, in almost complete condition.						
4AF10	P5A	Prince Henry, Duke of Gloucester	Hooper Limousine; No. 9663; Design 8292	Black	Fawn Leather	Unknown, Unknown, 1960s	
4AF10	It wore Prince Henry, Duke of Gloucester personal vehicle registration plate XH 8888 but reverted to 714 AYX on its sale.; It features two side-mounted spare wheels.						
4AF10	It was delivered on 1 September 1951.; The car was sold in October 1960: According to Philip C. Brook's article "Phantoms in a Postwar World": "...the late HRH Prince William of Gloucester told me that the family sold the car because it was too big." However the truth for the sale might be somewhat different as the car was involved in a 'spectacular accident...whilst the entertainer Shirley Bassey was on board', this damage being repaired during the sale.; The car was featured in the 1966 film Arabesque and Fumo di Londra (Smoke over London).; In 1967, John Schaler imported the car to the United States.; The car returned to the UK in 1969, and through to the early 1990s at least, it was owned by Lesley Smith, of Bury, United Kingdom.						
4AF12	P6A	Ernest Hives, the managing director and chairman of Rolls-Royce Limited	Hooper; Limousine, 7-seater No. 9719; Design 8307	Blue Repainted: Black	Beige	Ion Țiriac, Romania, 2022	
4AF12	According to Martin Bennett's book Rolls-Royce & Bentley: The Crewe Years (3rd edition, 2011), Ernest Hives is said to have used the car only infrequently, preferring his Bentley R Type #B226WH.; It wore the vehicle registration plate NTU 176.						
4AF12	The car was delivered on 1 July 1951.; By the end of 1952, the car had been converted to an automatic – from a manual – transmission.; In 1954, the car was sold to Princess Marina, Duchess of Kent and wore her vehicle registration plate YR 11.; By 1993, it was privately owned in Pennsylvania.; The car was displayed at 2015 Pebble Beach Concours d'Elegance where it won the Lucius Beebe Trophy.; In 2017, the car had been thoroughly restored.						
4AF14	P7A	Generalissimo Francisco Franco of Spain	H. J. Mulliner Limousine, 5-seater No. 5035; Design 7181	Black	West of England Beige	Spanish Army. Barracks La Reina and Príncipe de Asturias, El Pardo, Madrid, Spain	The vehicle on the left
4AF14	Armoured by the English Steel Corporation.; Centre armrest.; This is the one normally used by heads of states during state visits to Spain; Wears the number plate ET-42927-O.						The vehicle on the left
4AF14	It was delivered on 23 June 1952.; Used in numerous official and State occasions.						The vehicle on the left
4AF16	P8A	Generalissimo Francisco Franco of Spain	H. J. Mulliner Limousine, 7-seater No. 5036 Design 7181	Black	West of England Beige	Spanish Army. Barracks La Reina and Príncipe de Asturias, El Pardo, Madrid, Spain	The vehicle on the right
4AF16	Armoured by the English Steel Corporation.; Centre armrest.; Usually used by the Spanish Head of State for certain occasions, such as the parade of the National Day of Spain.; It wears the number plate ET-42926-O.						The vehicle on the right
4AF16	It was delivered on 11 July 1952.; Used in numerous official and State occasions.						
4AF18	P9A	Generalissimo Francisco Franco of Spain	H. J. Mulliner Cabriolet No. 4945 Design 7183	Black	Green Leather	Spanish Army. Barracks El Rey (Sala Histórica de la Guardia Real), El Pardo, Madrid, Spain	
4AF18	Armoured.; Centre armrest.; The only Phantom IV to have all four doors hinged on their leading edges.; It wears the number plate ET-42928-O.						
4AF18	The car was delivered on 28 March 1952.; Used in numerous official and State occasions.						
4AF20	P10A	Aga Khan III	Hooper Limousine, Sedanca de Ville No. 9750 Design 8293	Dark Green (Light Green pinstripe) Repainted: Red Repainted: Dark Green (Light Green pinstripe) (2015)	Red Leather	Ion Țiriac / Romania / 2022	
4AF20	The only Phantom IV built in the Sedanca de Ville style.						
4AF20	It was delivered on 6 April 1952.; When Rolls Royce sold this car to Aga Khan they included a clause which said he could not sell the car. However, after his death his widow sold it to the Mayfair-Lennox hotel (Missouri, US), where it was used to pick up guests at the airport, but due to the short boot capacity it was resold in 1962.; The car was later repainted red, potentially during the ownership of Aga Khan III.; Owned by Bob Shaffer.; Owned by Axel Wars in the 1980s.; In August 2011, it was offered for sale at the Gooding & Company auction held in Pebble Beach, California. It was estimated to sell for $850,000-1,100,000. Bidding failed to satisfy the vehicle's reserve and it left the auction unsold.; The car was displayed at 2015 Pebble Beach Concours d'Elegance where it won 'Best of Class, Rolls-Royce & Bentley Postwar' award.; It is now under ownership of Ion Tiriac and in the museum Țiriac Collection and has been restored to its original two-tone green colour scheme in 2015.						
4AF22	P11A	The Prince Talal of Saudi Arabia	Franay Cabriolet No. Unknown Design 7183	Cream and Green Repainted: Black	Green Leather	Unknown	
4AF22	The only Phantom IV with a French-made coachwork.; This one was listed in their works description as a sedanca de ville, but a four-door cabriolet with divider window was erected on the chassis instead.; It has two covered spare wheels and at least two of the interior seats rotate at a sufficient angle to allow easier ingress and egress.						
4AF22	The car was delivered in June 1952.						
4BP1	P1B	King Faisal II of Iraq	Hooper Limousine No. 9890 Design 8361	Black	Red Leather	Baghdad, Iraq	
4BP1	The first of four series B cars, which differed in having wider eight-inch wheel rims.; Made for King Faisal II of Iraq's coronation.						
4BP1	It was delivered on 31 March 1953.; In August 1959 – after King Faisal's death – the car was auctioned as "unused", alongside his Staines estate. It was purchased by a car dealer, Raymond Way.; The car survived the Iraq War hidden in the basement carpark of the mayoralty of Baghdad along with many other prestigious cars. During this period it was stripped of its Rolls-Royce badging and Spirit of Ecstasy.						
4BP3	P2B	'Abd al-Ilah, Prince Regent of Iraq	Hooper Touring Limousine, 7-seater No. 9891 Design 8370	Black Repainted: Black over White, Black Fenders, Repainted: Black over Dark Blue	French Blue Leather	Royal Automobile Museum, Jordan	
4BP3	Built for the coronation of his nephew, King Faisal II.						
4BP3	The car was delivered on 31 March 1953.; In the 1958 coup d'état, all the royal family members were assassinated. At the time of the uprising, the car was at Hooper's in London for servicing, and it was eventually sold in the US.; By 1967, the car was owned in the East of the United States by a Rolls-Royce collector.; In summer 1996, Robert Shaffner purchased 4BP3 and the car then resided in Pennsylvania.; Displayed at The Royal Automobile Museum, Amman, Jordan.						
4BP5	P3B	Queen Elizabeth II of the United Kingdom	Hooper Landaulette No. 9941 Design 8399	Royal Claret and Black	Front: Blue Leather Rear: Grey West of England Cloth	Private Collection, Missouri, USA	
4BP5	This car was built in the company's Golden Jubilee year and was initially retained by Rolls-Royce, and kept at their London showroom.; The car was deliberately specified and maintained to be ready for the Royal Household for use by the Royal Family.; This car is credited as the turning point for State Cars in the United Kingdom, ending Daimler's 55-year period of dominance in favour of Rolls-Royce.; It wore the vehicle registration plate STU 763 before being changed to OXR 2, one of Prince Philip, Duke of Edinburgh's plates.						
4BP5	It was delivered on 1 May 1954.; In January 1959, it was purchased by the Queen for use as an official state car. Being suitable for use in hot climates, the landaulette was used on several overseas tours.; Amongst many other duties, it served to convey bridesmaids and page boys to the Royal Weddings of 1981 and 1986.; The car was retired from the working fleet not long afterwards, but remained in the Royal Mews until 2002; it was then returned to the factory (this apparently being a condition of the original sale).; Subsequently, it formed part of the 'historic Rolls-Royce heritage fleet' held by Bentley Motors Ltd and was displayed at Hunt House by the Sir Henry Royce Foundation.; In 2018, Bentley Motors Ltd sold the car off by auction for £800,000.						
4BP7	P4B	Princess Margaret, Countess of Snowdon	H. J. Mulliner Limousine, 7-seater No. 5686 Design 7368	Black	Beige Cloth	Unknown, Sold in 2021	
4BP7	Known by Rolls-Royce as 'The Baron Montaigne'.; It was fitted with an adjustable seat in case the Princess wished to drive herself.; It wore Princess Margaret, Countess of Snowdon's personal vehicle registration plate PM 6450 until it was retired from service in 1967, after 13 years.						
4BP7	The car was delivered to Clarence House on 16 July 1954 at an estimated cost of £8,500 (equivalent to £202,000 in 2025).; In 1967, when acquired by A.W.D. Adams, of Essex, United Kingdom, the plate changed to 302 HYP. Over the next 30 years, the Adams family hired out the car as part of their limousine service.; In 1969, the car made an appearance in the James Bond film, On Her Majesty's Secret Service, still wearing the number, 302 HYP.; In 2003, it moved into the hands of a collector in Pennsylvania, Robert Shaffner, who has owned three of the 18 cars over the years.; In 2008, the car, still in its original black colour and featuring its Pegasus hood ornament, was sold by The Real Car Company of Bethesda, Gwynedd, North Wales to St. Moritz Automobile Club member Dr. Norbert Seeger (DE). No selling price was published, but the company stated that it sold for "somewhere around $750,000".; Dr. Seeger displayed the car at several prominent car shows in Europe, including the Concorso d'Eleganza Villa d'Este at Lake Como, Italy.; In 2021, it was sold by RM Sotheby's for CHF2,255,000, in a sale that included 24 other cars from Dr. Seeger's collection.						
4CS2	P1C	Abdullah III Al-Salim Al-Sabah, Emir of Kuwait	H. J. Mulliner Limousine, 6 Light Saloon No. 5724 Design 7376	Two-Tone Green	Olive Green Leather	Nethercutt Collection, California, USA	
4CS2	The first of three series C cars, which have wider front brake drums, the 3^{3/4} in. bore, 6,515 cc version of the straight-eight engine, automatic transmission as standard and the same eight-inch wheel rims like the series B.						
4CS2	The car was delivered in November 1955.; In 1967, it was sold out of Kuwait, along with #4CS4, to Edgar Jurist, New Jersey, USA, who sold it within the state almost immediately.; The car stayed at the Ellenville Motor Museum as part of the Resnick Collection.; In 1983, it formed part of the Merle Norman Classic Beauty Collection, Sylmar, California, where it displayed only 5,000 miles.; From at least 2010, the car has been on display at the Nethercutt Collection, Sylmar, California. J.B. Nethercutt being the nephew of Merle Norman. According to a plaque in the museum, the car cost $25,000 when purchased new.						
4CS4	P2C	Abdullah III Al-Salim Al-Sabah, Emir of Kuwait	H. J. Mulliner Limousine No. 5725 Design 7376	Golden Copper and Silver	Beige Leather	Miguel de la Vía, Torre Loizaga, Biscay, Spain; 2022	
4CS4	It features an automatic gearbox and air conditioning.; It had additional features for the Emir: a red beacon and electrically operated privacy curtains.						
4CS4	It was delivered in January 1956.; It was sold out of Kuwait in 1967 along with #4CS2 to Edgar Jurist, New Jersey, USA, who sold it within the state almost immediately.; From there, it moved through the hands of a number of North American collectors – the Resnick Motor Museum collection, amongst them.; In 1986 it was owned by Ken Smith in San Diego.; In 1987, it now resided with Richard P. Kughn.; In 1995, it was for sale in the US, having driven only 3,318 miles.; 1997 saw its sale through Barrett Jackson in Scottsdale, Arizona.; In 1998, it was owned by Dennis P. Nicotra of Connecticut, where it was Teal over Gold and displayed 5,000 miles.; In 1999, it was acquired by its current owner, Miguel de la Vía, in 1999 who displays it at Torre Loizaga, Biscay, Spain.						
4CS6	P3C	Mohammad Reza Pahlavi, Shah of Iran	Hooper Limousine No. 10177 Design 8425	Black Repainted: Bordeaux	Grey Leather	National Car Museum of Iran	
4CS6	The figurine is standing, not kneeling.; Queen Elizabeth II of the United Kingdom passengered in this car, while visiting the Shah.						
4CS6	It was delivered on 11 December 1956.; In 1977 the car was in London for "major repairs and refurbishing".; In 1980, after three years and a reported $25,000 worth of repairs, the car was still in the UK. There was a dispute over who owned the car; the ousted Shah or representatives of the Iranian Embassy who said it belonged to their country.; In 1988, the exiled Pahlavi family lost their claim to ownership in the British courts and it was subsequently returned to Iran.; Displayed at the National Car Museum of Iran.						

== See also ==
Bugatti Royale, another luxury car model intended to be sold to the royalty.
