= Francis Hooper =

British architect

Francis George Fielder Hooper (1859–1938) was an architect who worked mostly in London and Kent.

He was born at Regent's Park, London on 7 July 1859, the son of a coach builder hooper (coachbuilder). He was educated at Spencer House, Wimbledon Common and at Marlborough College.

== Career ==
While Hooper was articled to Arthur Cates, Crown Surveyor, between 1876 and 1879, he studied architecture at University College London and at the Royal Academy. From c1875 to 1879 he was working for Messrs Saxon Snell. On 6 November 1882 he was elected as a member of the Royal Institute of British Architects. He won the Pugin travelling Scholarship in 1882 and the Godwin Bursary in 1888.

Hooper commenced practice in Westminster in the mid-1880s. He set up in partnership with Henry Archer in 1889 based at Amberley House, Norfolk Street, Strand. This partnership ended in 1896. In 1894-95 he was Vice President of the Architectural Association. He became a Fellow of the Royal Institute of British Architects in 1897. In 1905 he was architect to Beckenham School Board. He retired in the late 1920s and his practice, Hooper, Belfrage and Hooper of Norfolk House, Norfolk Street, Stand, was taken over by his son Arnold.

== Beckenham ==
Hooper moved to Hayne Road, Beckenham to join his parents in the early 1880s. He married Louisa Glover of Beckenham in 1891. On their marriage they moved into a house he had designed—Kelsey, Wickham Road, Beckenham.

The Hoopers were resident at Kelsey, Wickham Road, Beckenham from 1894–1896 then at 27 Albemarle Road, Beckenham from 1896 until around 1912. They then lived at Kelsey Corner, Manor Way. Hooper died here on 11 June 1938.

He was an elected member of Beckenham Urban District Council from 1913 to 1919.

== Built work ==
- 22–24 Kensington High Street. Demolished.
- 1883–84 Ballroom at 22 Kensington Palace Gardens
- 1884 Whitehall Court, Victoria Embankment, London (with Archer) (1884)
- 1888–91 Hyde Park Court (Mandarin Oriental Hotel), Hyde Park, London
- 127 Piccadilly, London
- 1896–1901 Catesby House Stables, Northants (with Archer)
- 1890 Seven houses at Wickham Road, Beckenham including: -

Johanisbad, 54 Wickham Road, Beckenham (1890). Demolished.

Youlegreave, 56 Wickham Road, Beckenham (1891). Demolished.

The Gables, 58 Wickham Road, Beckenham (1891). Demolished.

Rostrevor, 60 Wickham Road, Beckenham (1891). Demolished.

Kelsey, 62 Wickham Road, Beckenham (1891). Demolished.

Bryansford, 64 Wickham Road, Beckenham (1891). Demolished.

66 Wickham Road, Beckenham (c1895). Demolished.

68 Wickham Road, Beckenham (c1895). Demolished.

70 Wickham Road, Beckenham (1897). Demolished.

72 Wickham Road, Beckenham (1897). Local list.

74 Wickham Road, Beckenham (1897). Grade II listed building.

76 Wickham Road, Beckenham (1898). Grade II listed building.

- 1891 58 Copers Cope Road, Beckenham
- 1891 Vicarage, Court Downs Road, Beckenham. Demolished.
- 1896 Fairoak, 3 Overbury Avenue, Beckenham. Demolished.
- 1898 Vestry addition to Christ Church, Fairfield Road, Beckenham
- 1901 Christ Church Halls, Fairfield Road, Beckenham
- 1912 Church Schools and Hall, Preston Park, Brighton
- 1914 38 Manor Way, Beckenham
- 1914 24 Manor Way, Beckenham
- 1930 Landscaping scheme for Beckenham War Memorial.

== Papers ==
- 'The Planning of Town Houses' before the advanced class of construction and practice of the Architectural Association on 26 October 1887
- 'Artisan's Dwellings' read at the Congress of the Sanitary Insititue, Brighton, (after 1888).
- 'Building Control in Paris' read before RIBA, 1889.
- Perspective sketches for two houses on Wickham Road, Beckenham (including a ground floor plan of one of them) published in Academy Architecture, 1894. One is The Gables. The other was not erected on Wickham Road but built instead at 58 Copers Cope Road, Beckenham.
