= Hooper (coachbuilder) =

British coachbuilding business

Coordinates: 51.504695°N 0.2798804°W

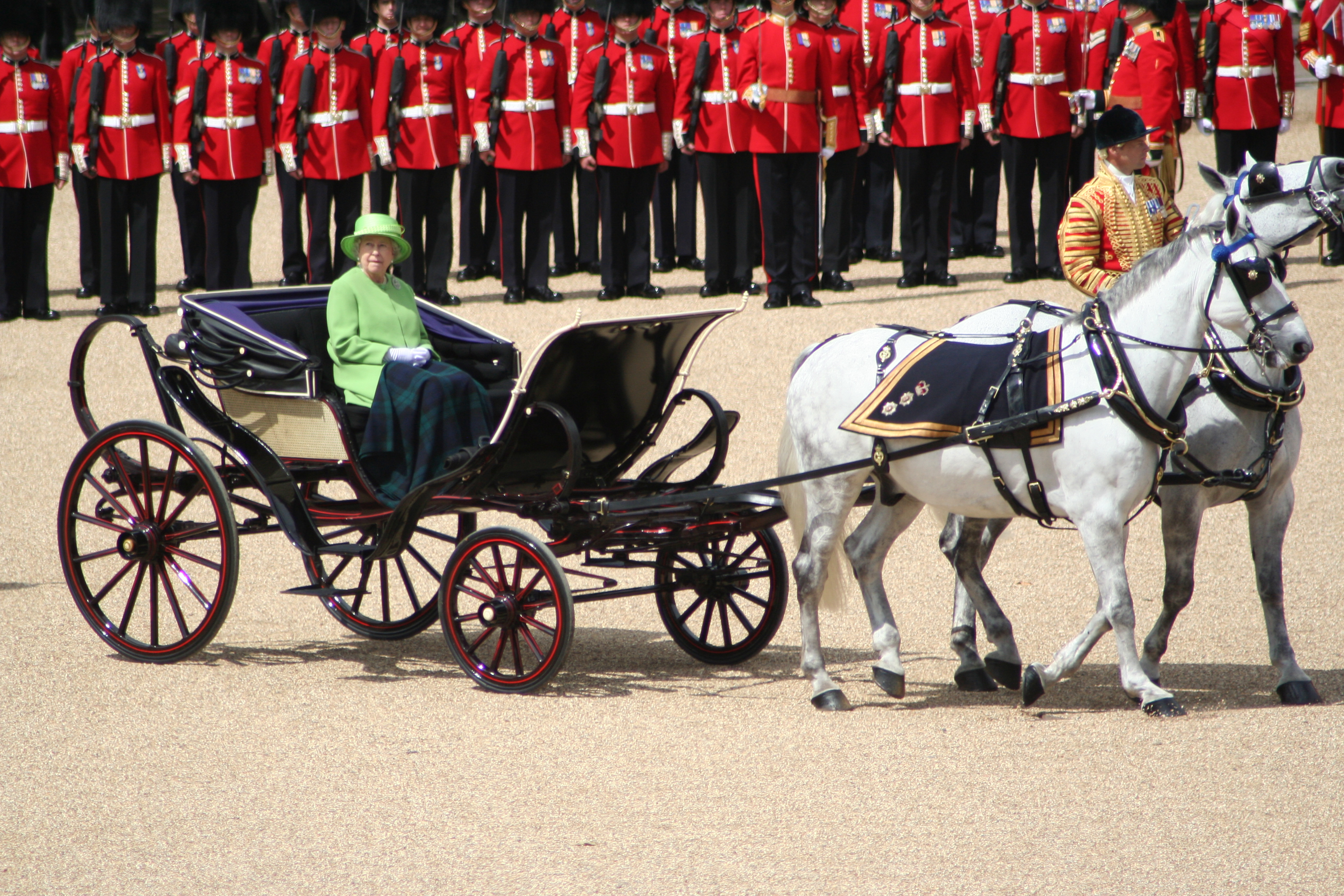
Post-phaeton Windsor Greys in perfect step made for Queen Victoria, 1842

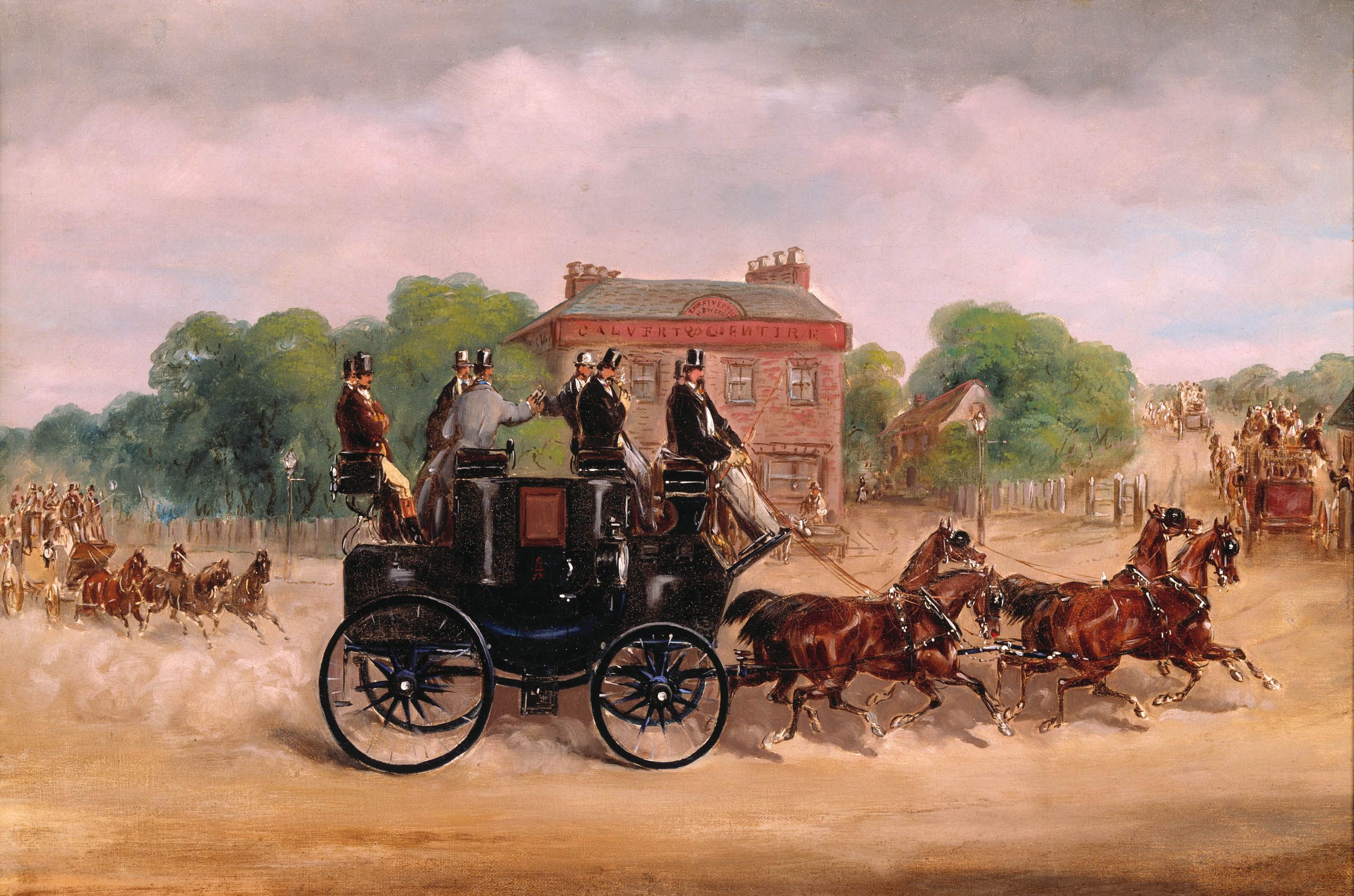
Drags of the Four-in-Hand Club Mr Holroyd, Lord Lonsdale and the Duke of Sutherland (sharing driving) on the box of the drag in the foreground

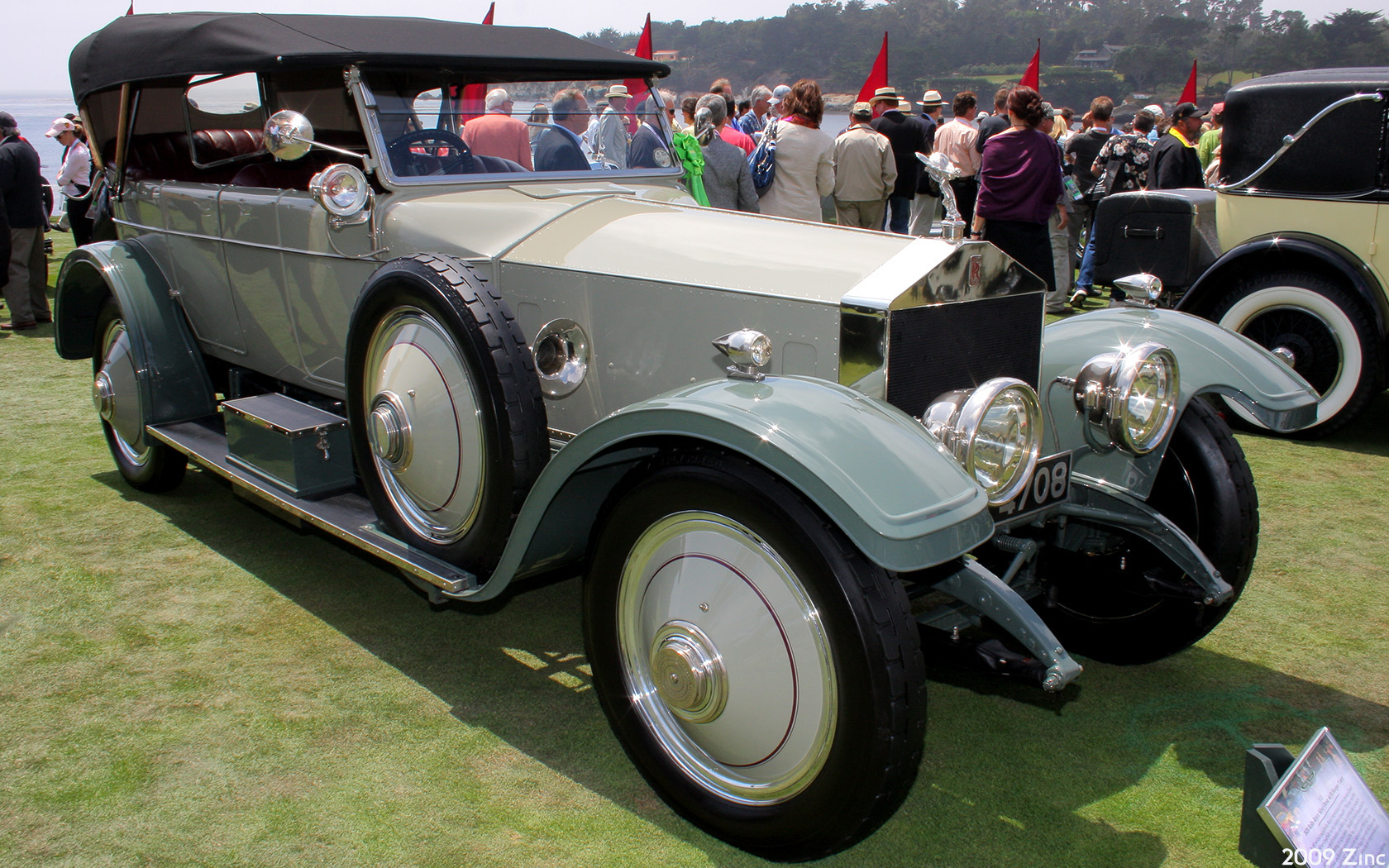
Tourer 1920 Rolls-Royce 40/50 Silver Ghost chassis

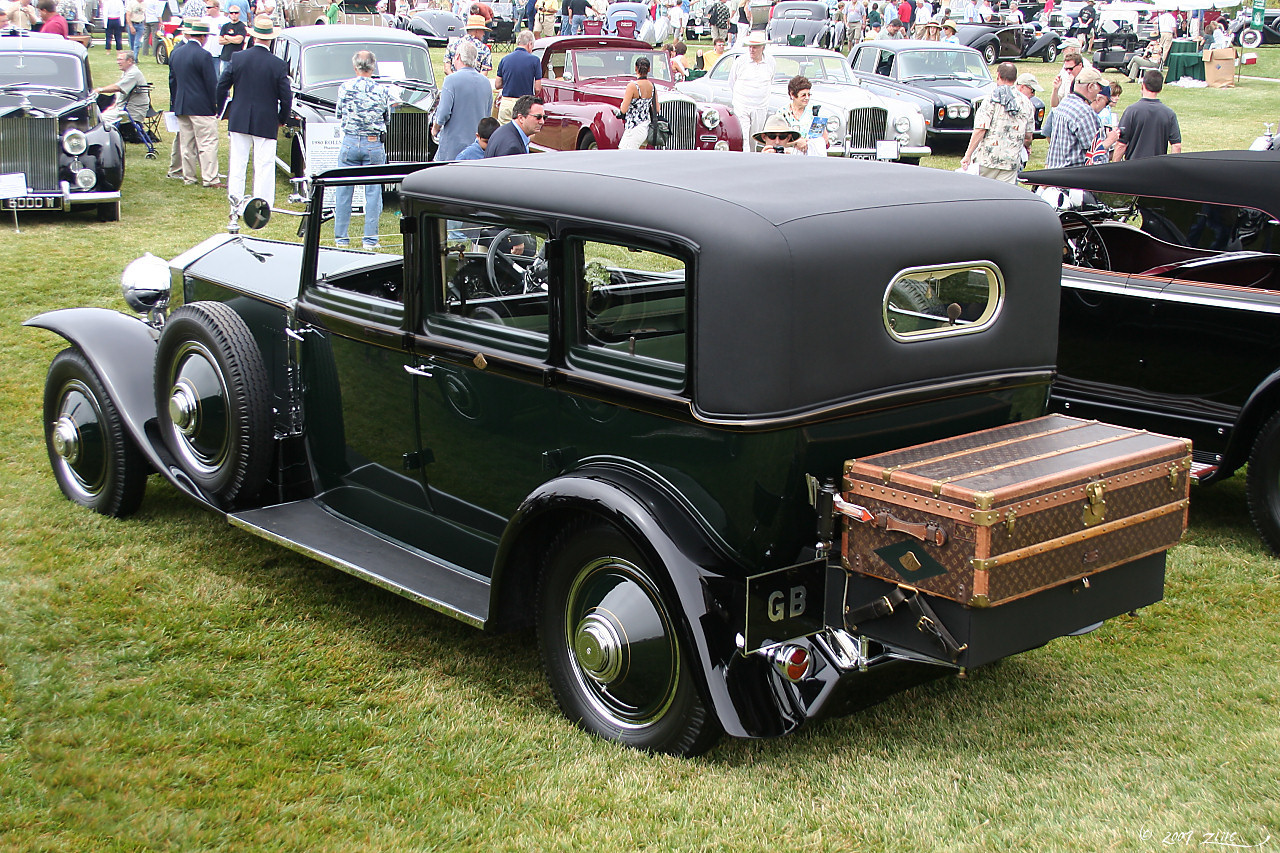
Limousine 1929 on a Rolls-Royce Phantom I chassis

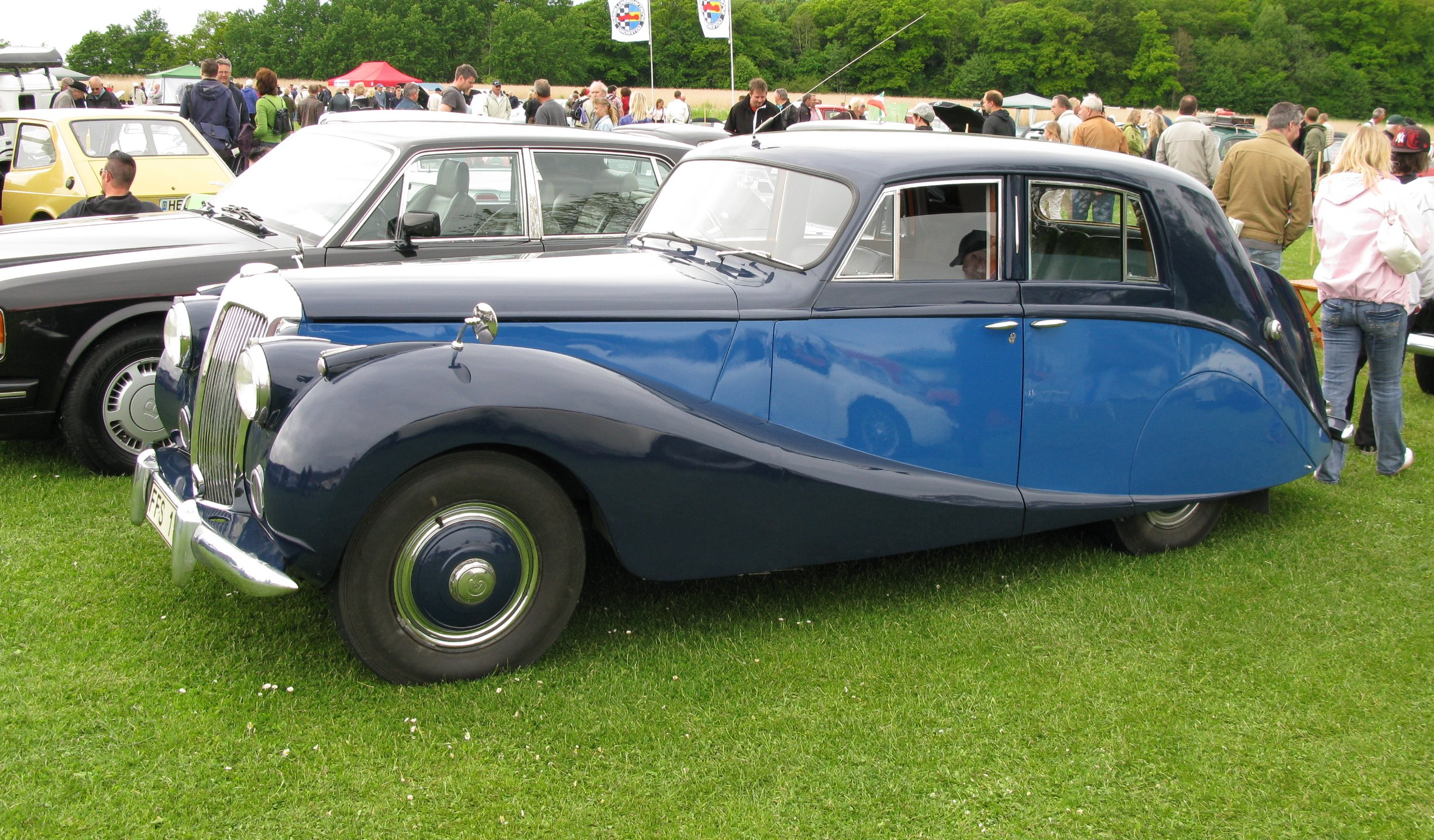
A saloon in their postwar Empress style on Daimler's smallest 2½-litre chassis

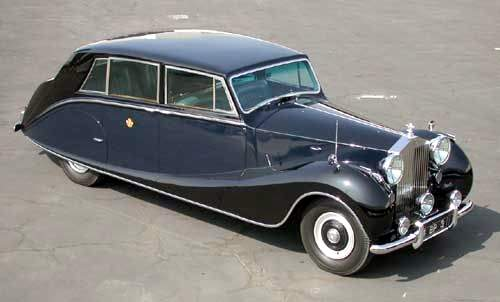
Touring limousine, 7 seater 1953 for The Prince Regent of Iraq. This car is 19 ft long and 6 ft 5 inches wide and was built on a Rolls-Royce Phantom IV chassis.

Hooper & Co. was a British coachbuilding business for many years based in Westminster London. From 1805 to 1959 it was a notably successful maker, to special order, of luxury carriages, both horse-drawn and motor-powered.

== Founding ==
The company was founded as Adams and Hooper in 1807 (Note: City of Westminster Archives Centre: Hooper and Co Records: ref 738. Administrative history: Hooper & Co, coachmakers, began trading in 1846 at 28 Haymarket. However, the company can be traced back to 1807 when J and G Adams opened a coachmaking business at 57 Haymarket. In 1811, George Adams moved to 28 Haymarket, joined later by George Hooper in 1833. In 1846, the company was renamed Hooper & Co. In 1867 the company moved their premises to Victoria Street, then, to 54 St James's Street in 1897. Hooper and Co. closed in 1959, by which time they were a subsidiary company of the Birmingham Small Arms Company.) in 1805 and held a royal warrant from 1830, building elegant horse-drawn carriages, supplying them to King William IV, (Note: Imperial College & Science Museum Libraries: Science Museum Library Swindon: ref MS 228. Includes articles, company advertisements, particulars of various state coaches, a 1956 report on Hoopers for the board of BSA, and numerous photos. The photos are of special coaches and motor cars, royal visits to Hoopers in the 1930s, the Hooper factory in the second world war and workshops in the 1950s. Includes also a lacquered coloured line drawing of a char-a-banc designed by Prince Consort and built by Hoopers in 1845) Queen Victoria and King Edward VII. They moved into motor bodies at the turn of the 20th century. The first royal car, a Hooper body on a Daimler chassis, was delivered to Sandringham on 28 March 1900. It was painted chocolate brown with red lines; a livery which continued for the royal family well into the twentieth century.

=== Market ===
Hooper specialized in the very top tier of the market, building the most luxurious bodies possible without consideration of cost. The models were not sporty, as the company specialized in stately, elegant carriages. Coach customers included the Marquis of Londonderry and the Marquis of Crewe . Car body customers included the Kings of Spain, Norway, Portugal and Siam, the Shah of Persia and the Negus of Abyssinia. In 1911, Hooper built an extension onto their Kings Road works, due to increased customer demand. Their London showroom, opened 1896 (possibly earlier), was on the corner of St James' Street and Bennet Street. It included a vehicle lift so that coaches and cars could be displayed at first floor. The alterations are likely to have been overseen by Francis Hooper, architect, son of the then owner.

==== Aircraft ====
During World War I, Hooper turned to aircraft manufacture, eventually producing Sopwith Camels at the rate of three a day. With peace, the firm returned to coachbuilding. They weathered the Great Depression of the 1930s far better than most coachbuilders, even building a second factory in Acton, West London. In the peak year of 1936, more than 300 bodies were built.

With re-armament in the late 1930s, another factory was opened in Park Royal, London, on Western Avenue, next to the Callard & Bowser confectionery works, and during World War II, they built fuselage sections for De Havilland Mosquito bombers, Airspeed Oxfords and gliders.

=== Expansion ===
In 1938 Hooper acquired rivals Barker who were in receivership. Barker retained its separate identity.

Hooper was acquired by The Daimler Company in 1940, becoming part of the BSA industrial group.

=== Lady Docker's cars ===
Post war, Hooper became famous for making a series of outrageously bodied large Daimlers for Lady Docker, the wife of the BSA chairman. This season's extravagant new Docker Daimler was exhibited each October at the London Motor Show.

Docker Daimlers

- 1951 Stardust or The Golden Daimler, limousine
- 1952 Blue Clover, 5 seater saloon
- 1953 Silver Flash, 2 seater fixed head coupé
- 1954 Star Dust, limousine
- 1955 Golden Zebra, 2 door, 4 seater fixed head coupé

One Daimler, possibly the Golden Zebra. Was acquired by Salford City Council as a Mayoral car, it had two(!, and was in use from approx 1966. It had a gold plated radiator top and gold plated door handles. Whilst the paintwork was kept in glittering condition the rust came from behind and left gaping holes in the mudguards and cills causing much amusement. The Reg number at the time as I recall, was RJ 1.

=== Alloy structure ===
As the era of building cars on separate chassis was ending, and with it the market for complete bodies, Hooper completed the transition from wood-framed bodywork to bodies built over a skeleton of cast or extruded aluminium. Cast alloy was first used about 1933 in door and windscreen pillars where the 'fight' between roof and scuttle structures tended to cause cracking.

== End of production ==
Rolls-Royce, and their subsidiary, Bentley, became the main supplier of rolling chassis for the coachbuilding trade. Hooper's management decided to end production of coachbuilt bodies after Rolls-Royce's plans to cease series production of separate-chassis cars and use unibody construction exclusively became known to them in 1958. Their showroom at St. James's Street closed down at the end of September that year. Production at Daimler, Hooper's in-group chassis supplier, fell to 110 Daimler SP250 sports cars in 1959, with no saloons or limousines being built that year.

Hooper exhibited their coachbuilt cars for the last time at the 1959 Earls Court Motor Show. Four cars were on the stand: a close-coupled saloon based on a SP250 chassis, two Rolls-Royces, and a Bentley S2. In addition to being the only Hooper-bodied S2, and being built on BC1AR, the first S2 Continental chassis, the Bentley had the last bespoke body Hooper built, number 10294. It was finished in October 1959.

At the end of 1959, BSA transferred the remaining business to a new entity, Hooper (Motor Services) Ltd, which acted as a sales and service company. In 1970 the company became a Rolls-Royce distributor.

== Revival ==
In October 1981 Hooper (Motor Services) Ltd was purchased by Australian businessman and former racing driver Colin Hyams from Sir Gerald Glover lawyer /Trustee for the late Sir Bernard and Lady Docker. Hyams invested over £1.5 million in returning the company to its original roots as an authorised coach builder for Rolls Royce and Bentley motors including an authorised sales and service Dealership for Rolls-Royce and Bentley Motorcars. Hooper (Motor Services) Ltd continued to remain at Clabon Works, Kimberley Road, London NW 7SH since 1959. and in addition they offered these special coachbuilt motor cars:

- Rolls-Royce Silver Spirit two-door (Genève 1985)
- Bentley Turbo R two-door (Genève 1986)
- Empress II (Genève 1988)
- Emperor state limousine (Genève 1990)

A brief news item at the end of 1990 reported they would restore classic cars but the advertising did not continue.

Hooper & Co. (coachbuilders) Ltd. established 1807 is a different company, which appears to be dormant. Hooper (Motor Services) Ltd appears to be in operation and currently working on some new 21st century projects for the motor industry. The ownership still remains jointly under the control of the CEO Colin Hyams and J W Dick 11.

== Gallery ==
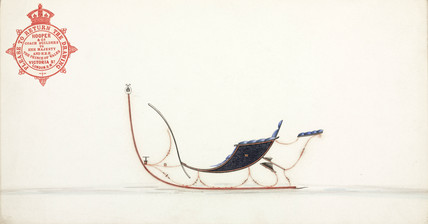
Sleigh

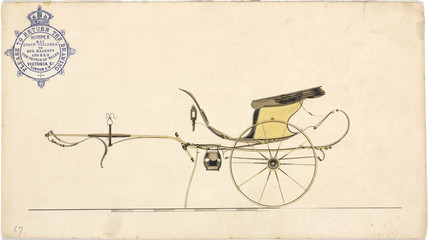
Trap

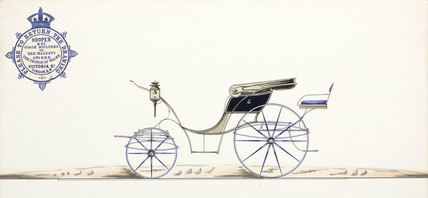
Phaeton

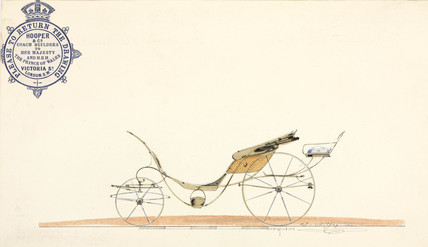
Phaeton

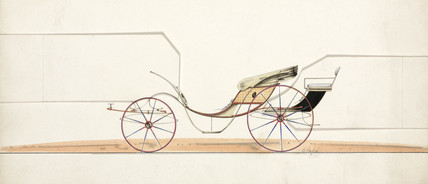
Phaeton

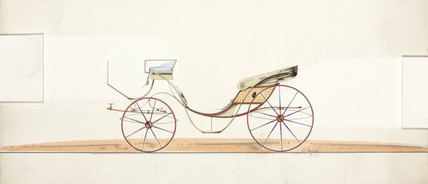
Victoria

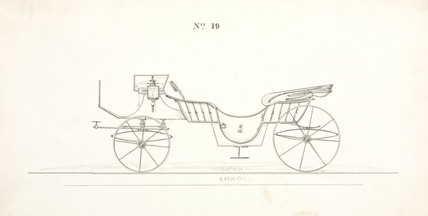
Barouche

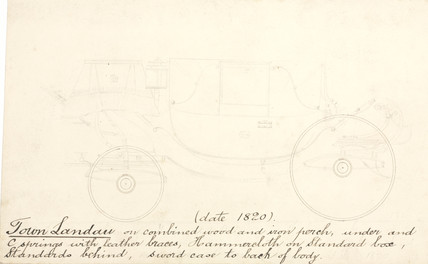
Town Landau

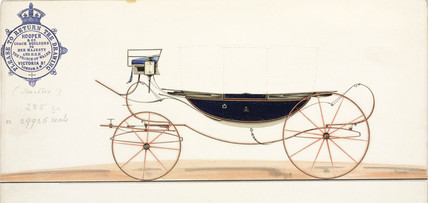
Landau

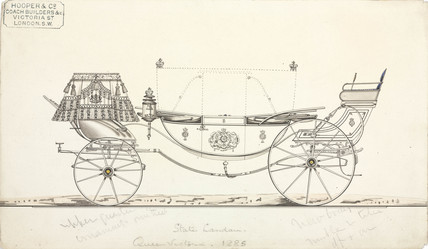
State Landau

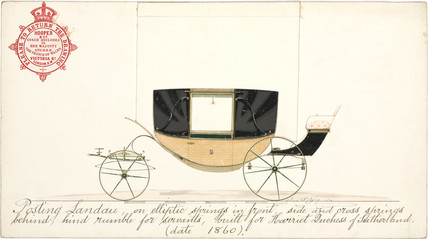
Posting Landau
for the Duchess of Sutherland

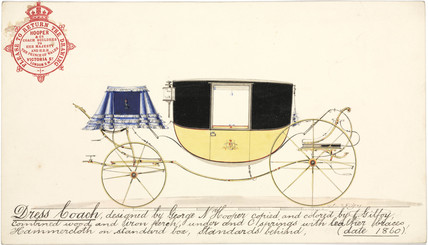
Dress Coach

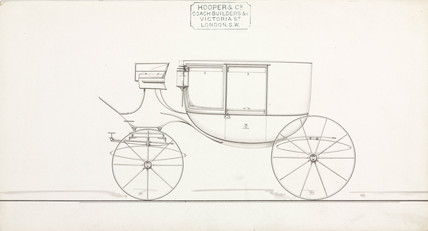
Coach

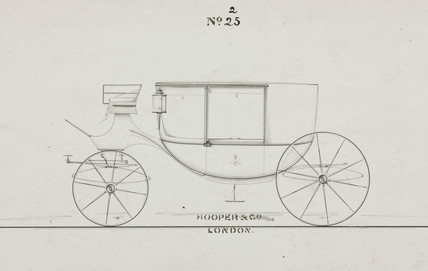
Coach 1850

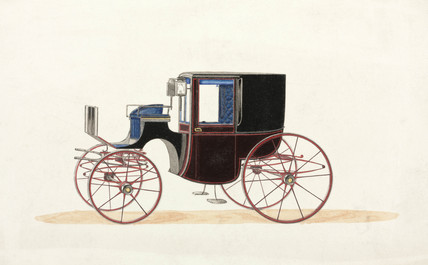
Brougham

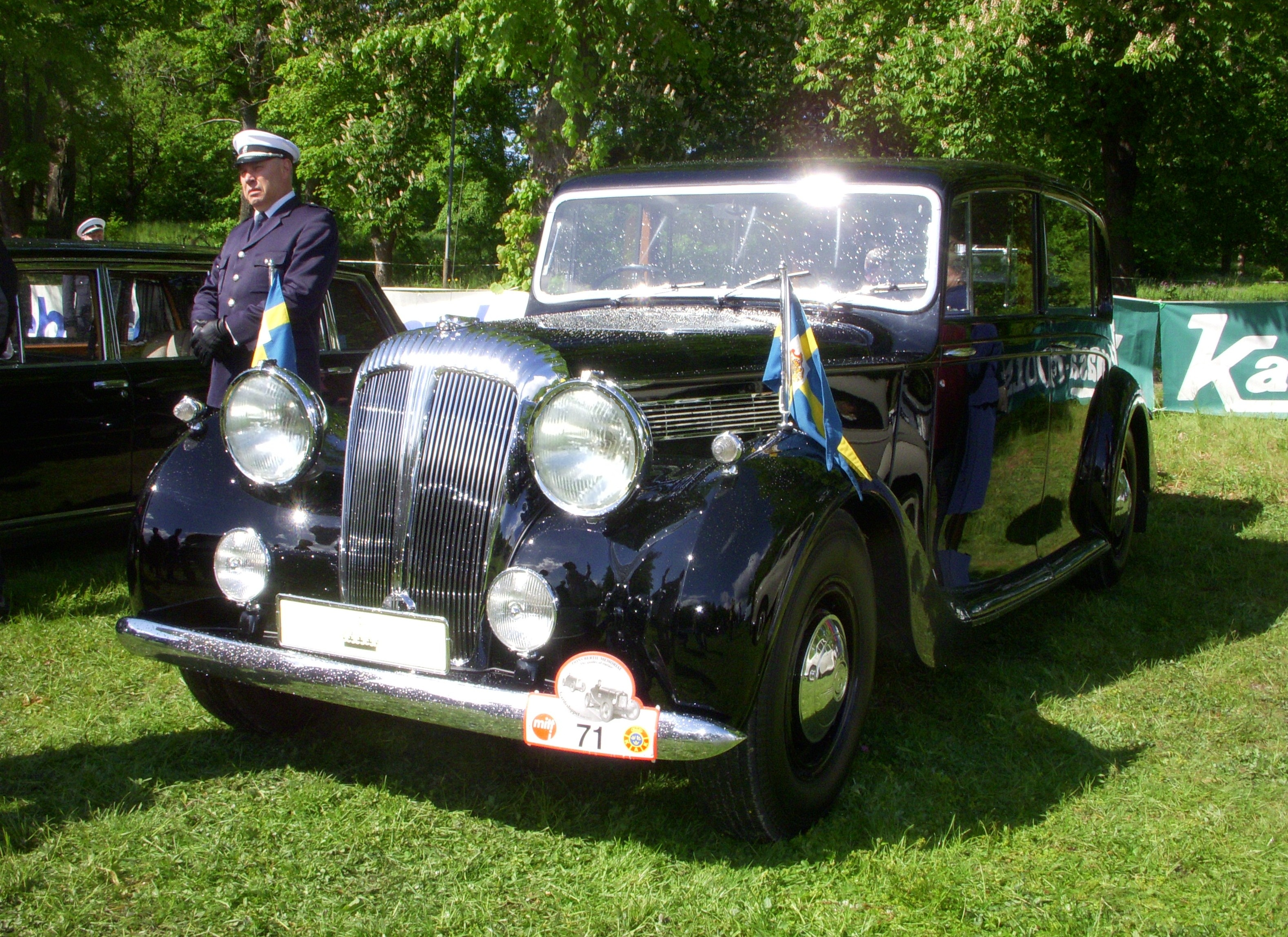
The car of The King of Sweden, a 1950 Daimler 27 HP, limousine (May 2011)

== Archives ==
- Science Museum, South Kensington, London - Hooper (Coachbuilders) & Co. Ltd. – original design drawings and motor car construction records c1910-59
- Denver Public Library - items from Hooper and Company records, 1947-1979 - received from Rippey's Veteran Car Museum (Denver, Colo.) including the collection of Osmond Rivers, Hooper designer 1930s to 1950s and Managing Director

== Notes ==
Footnotes

Citations
