= Rolls-Royce Phantom VI =

Ultra-luxury flagship automobile in its sixth generation

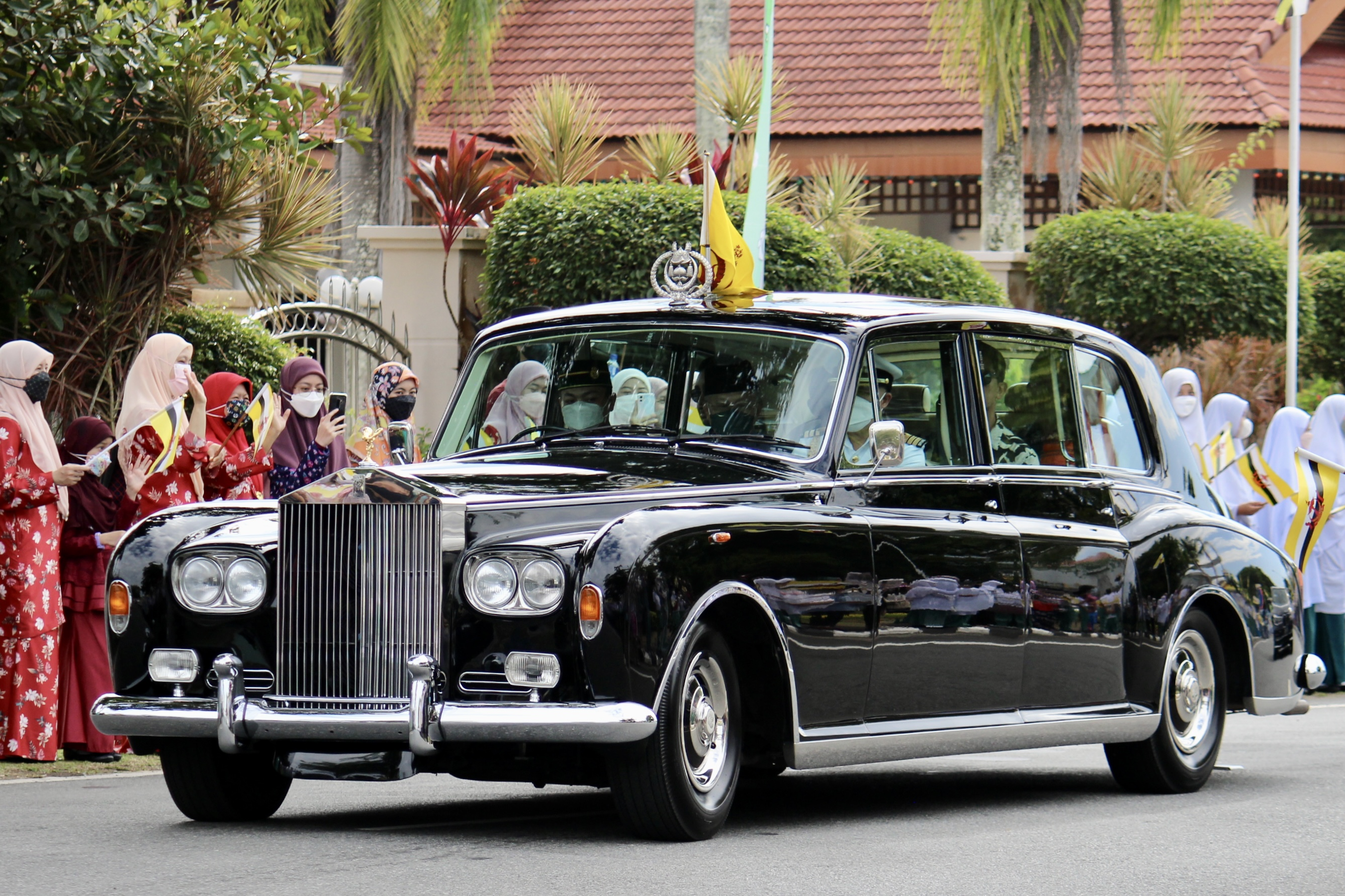
- Brunei sultanate's Rolls-Royce Phantom VI

Overview
- Manufacturer: Rolls-Royce Ltd (1968–1973); Rolls-Royce Motors (1973–1990)
- Production: 1968–1990; 374 produced
- Assembly: United Kingdom: West Sussex, England

Body and chassis
- Body style: Limousines and other styles to buyer's choice
- Layout: FR layout
- Related: Rolls-Royce Silver Shadow

Powertrain
- Engine: 6.2-litre (380 cubic inch) Rolls-Royce V8 (1968–1978); 6.75-litre (412 cubic inch) Rolls-Royce V8 (1979–1990)

Dimensions
- Wheelbase: 145 in (3,683 mm)
- Length: 238 in (6,045 mm)
- Width: 79 in (2,007 mm)
- Height: 69 in (1,753 mm)
- Curb weight: 2.5 t (2,500 kg) (approx.)

Chronology
- Predecessor: Phantom V
- Successor: Silver Spur Touring Limousine

The Rolls-Royce Phantom VI is a British limousine made from 1968 to 1990 by Rolls-Royce. A total of 374 Phantom VIs were made, of which fewer than 40 were manufactured in the last decade of production.

The exterior is nearly identical to the facelifted Phantom V, on which it was based.

== Construction ==
Most of the coachwork was created by Mulliner Park Ward, usually in limousine form, although a handful of landaulets were made.

The Phantom VI was the last Rolls-Royce with a separate chassis. It featured coil springs in front, leaf springs and live axle at the rear, and drum brakes on all four wheels. The car was powered by a 6,230 cc (380 cu in) 90-degree V8 with a bore of 104 mm (4.1 in) and stroke of 91.5 mm (3.60 in) with twin SU carburettors, coupled to a 4-speed automatic gearbox. The initial, single unit was soon replaced by separate front and rear air conditioning units. In a 1979 upgrade the engine capacity was increased to 6,750 cc (412 cu in), a 3-speed automatic gearbox with torque converter was substituted.

In 1990, the last Rolls-Royce Phantom VI chassis were built. However, as the completion of the coachwork by Mulliner Park Ward took around 18 months, the last cars were made in the period of the next two years.

Design of a Phantom VII based on the Silver Shadow's body was discussed in the 1970s, but plans were scrapped. No prototypes were built.

A new production Rolls-Royce Phantom was rolled out by BMW in 2003, their first model after their takeover of the Rolls-Royce marque.

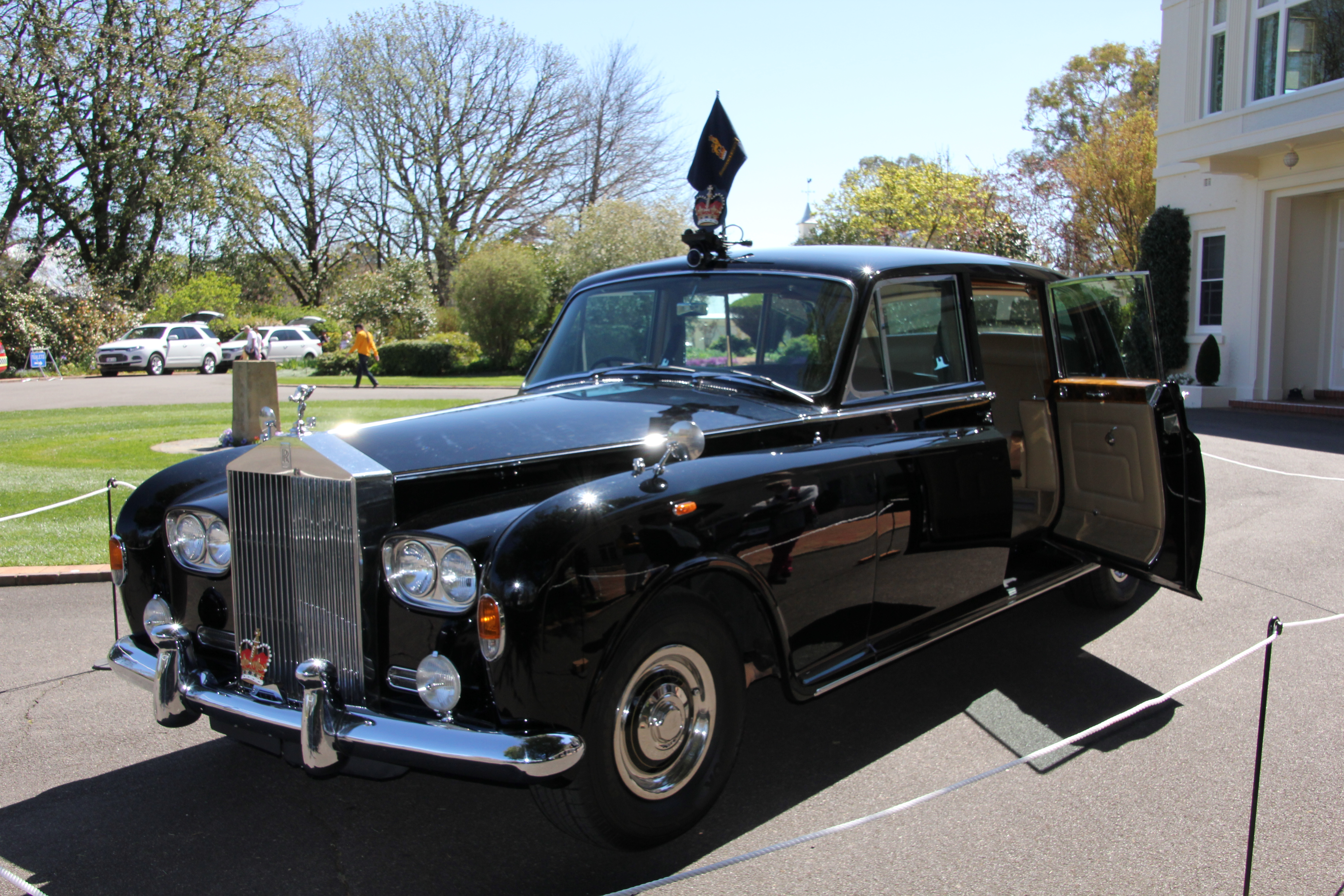
1970 Rolls-Royce Phantom VI limousine, the official car used on ceremonial occasions to transport the Governor-General of Australia and visiting heads of state

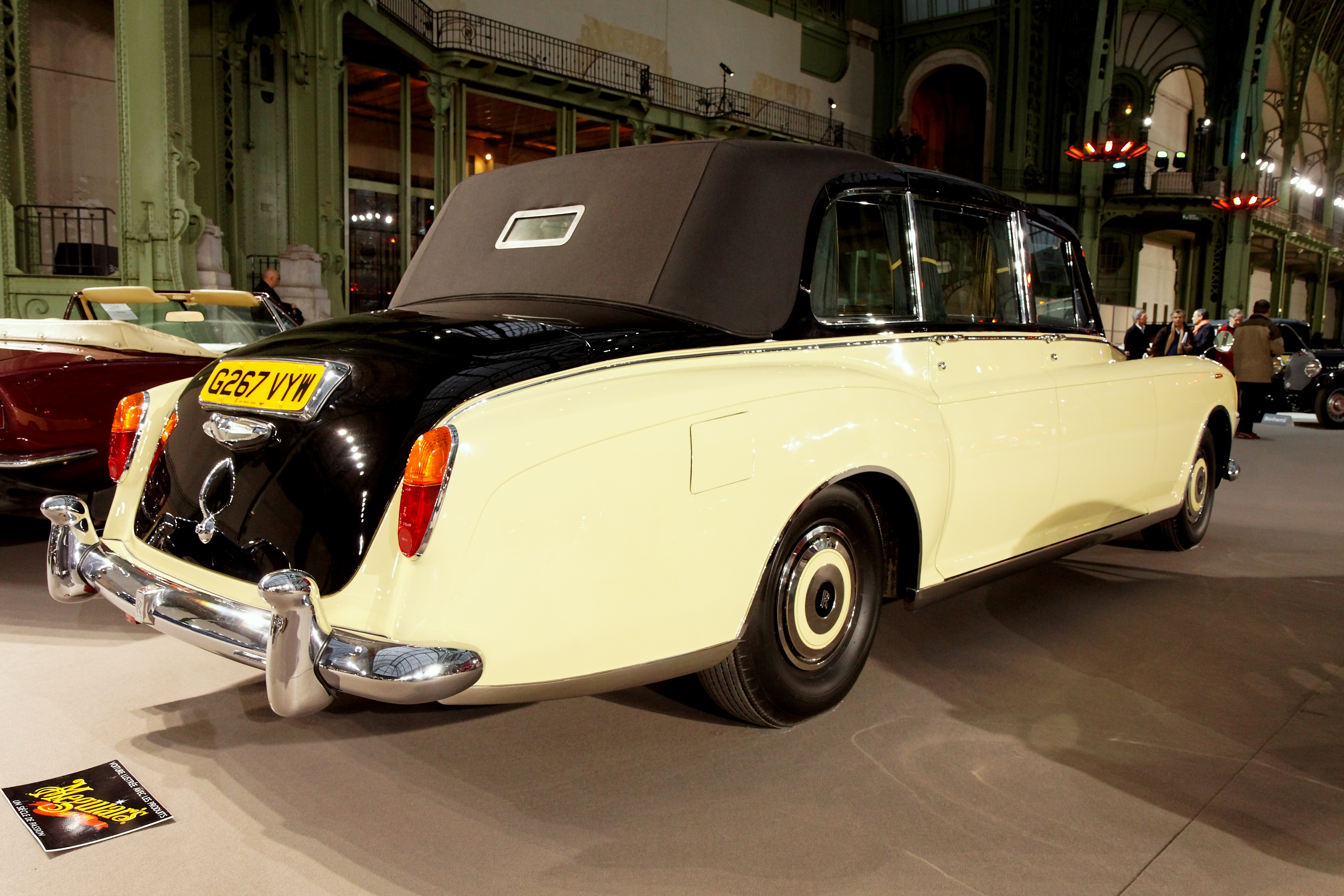
1990 landaulet by Mulliner Park Ward – invoice price new £498,365 (equivalent to £1,200,000 in 2025)

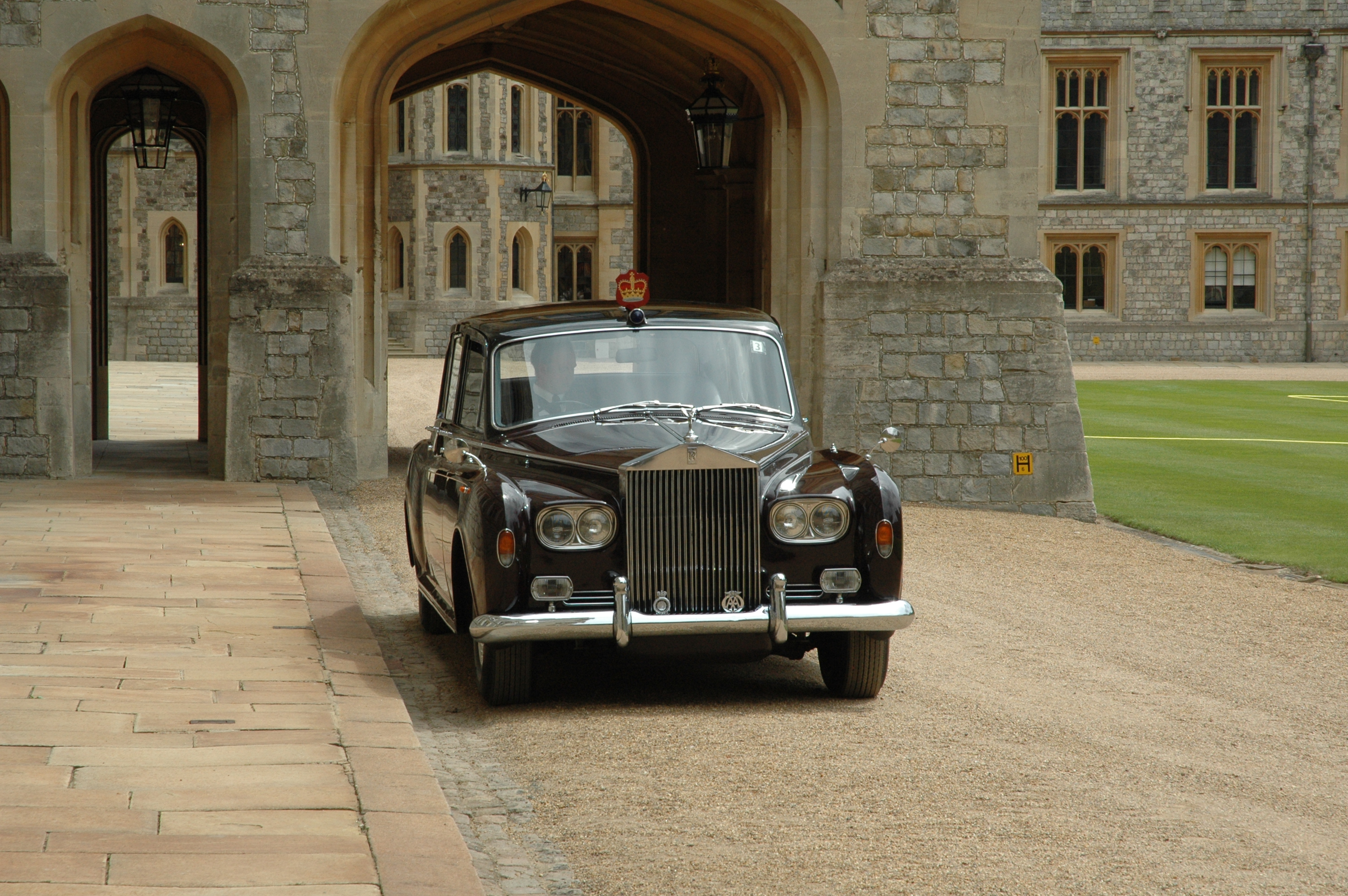
1986 Phantom VI at Windsor Castle

== Notable owners ==
Up to her death in 2022, Elizabeth II had two Rolls-Royce Phantom VI cars – the 1977 Silver Jubilee Car and a more conventional 1986 model. These vehicles were the two main official state cars until the introduction of the two Bentley State Limousines in 2002.

When it was used by Elizabeth II, the standard Spirit of Ecstasy bonnet mascot was replaced by a model of Saint George slaying the dragon.

Nataša Pirc Musar, President of Slovenia, also owns a Phantom VI; it was previously owned by Princess Alexandra, The Honourable Lady Ogilvy.

== Legacy ==
Three other Phantom models were built between 1995 and 1997, also by order of the Sultan of Brunei. This car was named Rolls-Royce Cloudesque and sometimes referred to as Rolls-Royce Phantom VII. The exterior is reminiscent of a stretched Phantom V Limousine; the extra length being added at the B-pillar. The boot is redesigned, looking more like that of a Silver Seraph. The headlights were designed in a Silver Cloud III style (but with chromed eyelids), hence the name Cloudesque.
