= Rolls-Royce Phantom V =

Ultra-luxury flagship automobile in its fifth generation

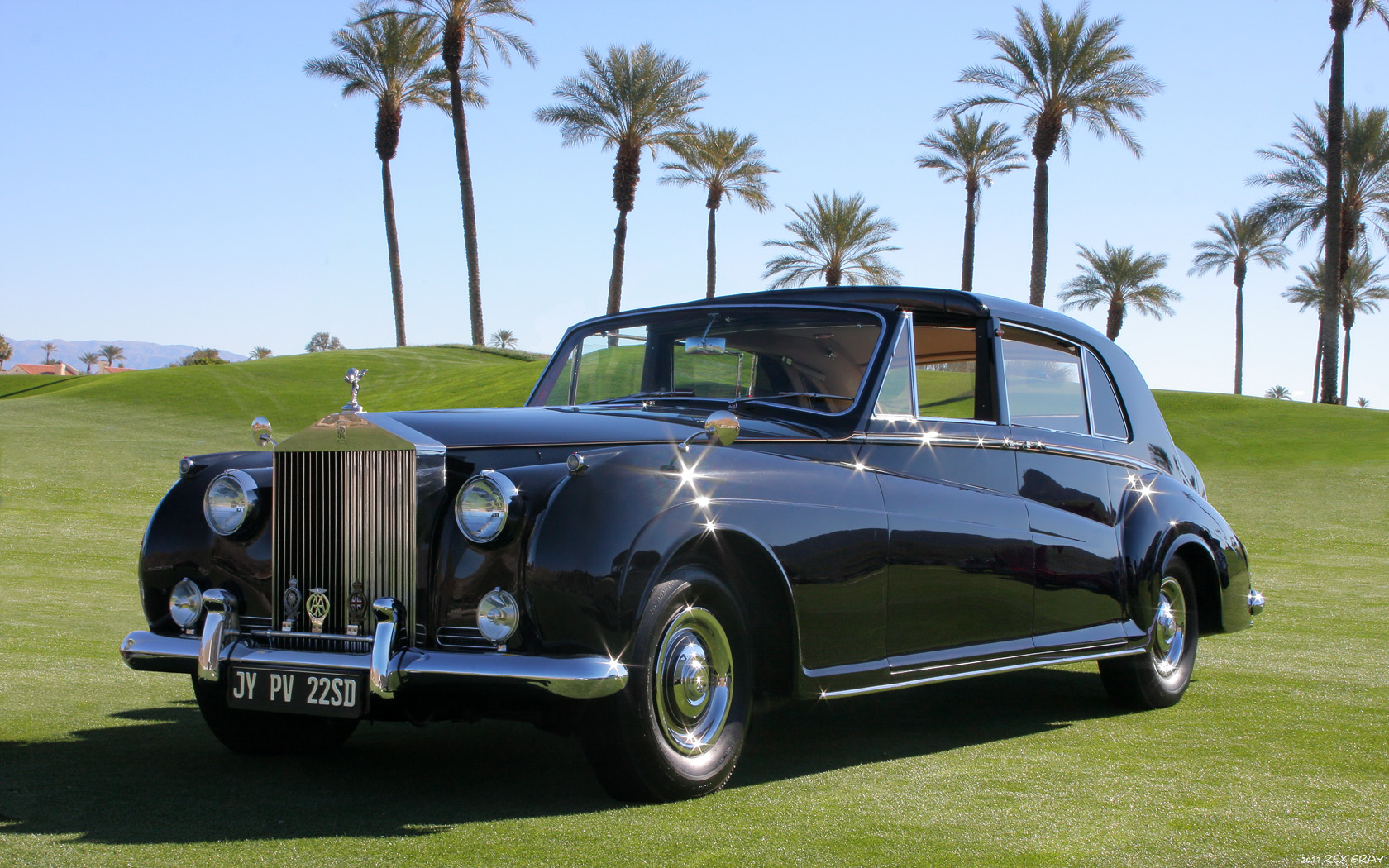

Overview
- Manufacturer: Rolls-Royce Ltd
- Production: 1959–1968; 518 produced
- Assembly: United Kingdom: Crewe, England (engine and chassis)
- Designer: John Polwhele Blatchley of Park Ward for design #980 and Mulliner Park Ward design #2003 et al A. F. McNeil of James Young for designs #PV10, PV15, PV16, PV22 et al.

Body and chassis
- Body style: 4-door saloon
- Layout: FR layout
- Related: Silver Cloud II

Powertrain
- Engine: 6,230 cc Rolls-Royce V8
- Transmission: 4-speed automatic

Dimensions
- Wheelbase: 145 in (3,683 mm)
- Length: 238 in (6,045 mm)
- Width: 79 in (2,007 mm)
- Height: 69 in (1,753 mm)
- Kerb weight: 5,600 lb (2,540 kg)

Chronology
- Predecessor: Phantom IV
- Successor: Phantom VI

The Rolls-Royce Phantom V is a large four-door limousine produced by Rolls-Royce Limited from 1959 to 1968. Based on the Silver Cloud II, it shares a V8 engine and Rolls-Royce Hydramatic automatic gearbox (manufactured under licence from General Motors by Rolls-Royce) with that model. Rolls-Royce built the cars' chassis and drivetrains, with bodies mainly made to standard designs by coachbuilders Park Ward, Mulliner Park Ward and James Young, former vendors absorbed by Rolls-Royce. Other coachbuilders, including Hooper, Henri Chapron and Woodall Nicholson, built one or two bodies each on Phantom V chassis.

The engine is a 6,230 cc 90-degree V8 with twin SU carburettors, coupled to a 4-speed automatic transmission. The car has massive drum brakes and a wheelbase of 3,683 mm. Power assisted steering was standard.

A low final drive ratio allowed a walking speed which was suitable for ceremonies. From 1963 onward, the Silver Cloud III's 7% more powerful engine and new front wings (incorporating the latter's quad headlamps) were fitted.

== Coachbuilders ==
Of the 518 total Phantom Vs built from 1959 to 1968, coachbuilder Park Ward, owned by Rolls-Royce, made 133 bodies; James Young built 197 bodies, and H. J. Mulliner & Co. bodied 9, before their 1959 acquisition by Rolls-Royce, who merged them into Park Ward in 1961, forming Mulliner Park Ward. The combined firm of Mulliner Park Ward built 174 bodies.

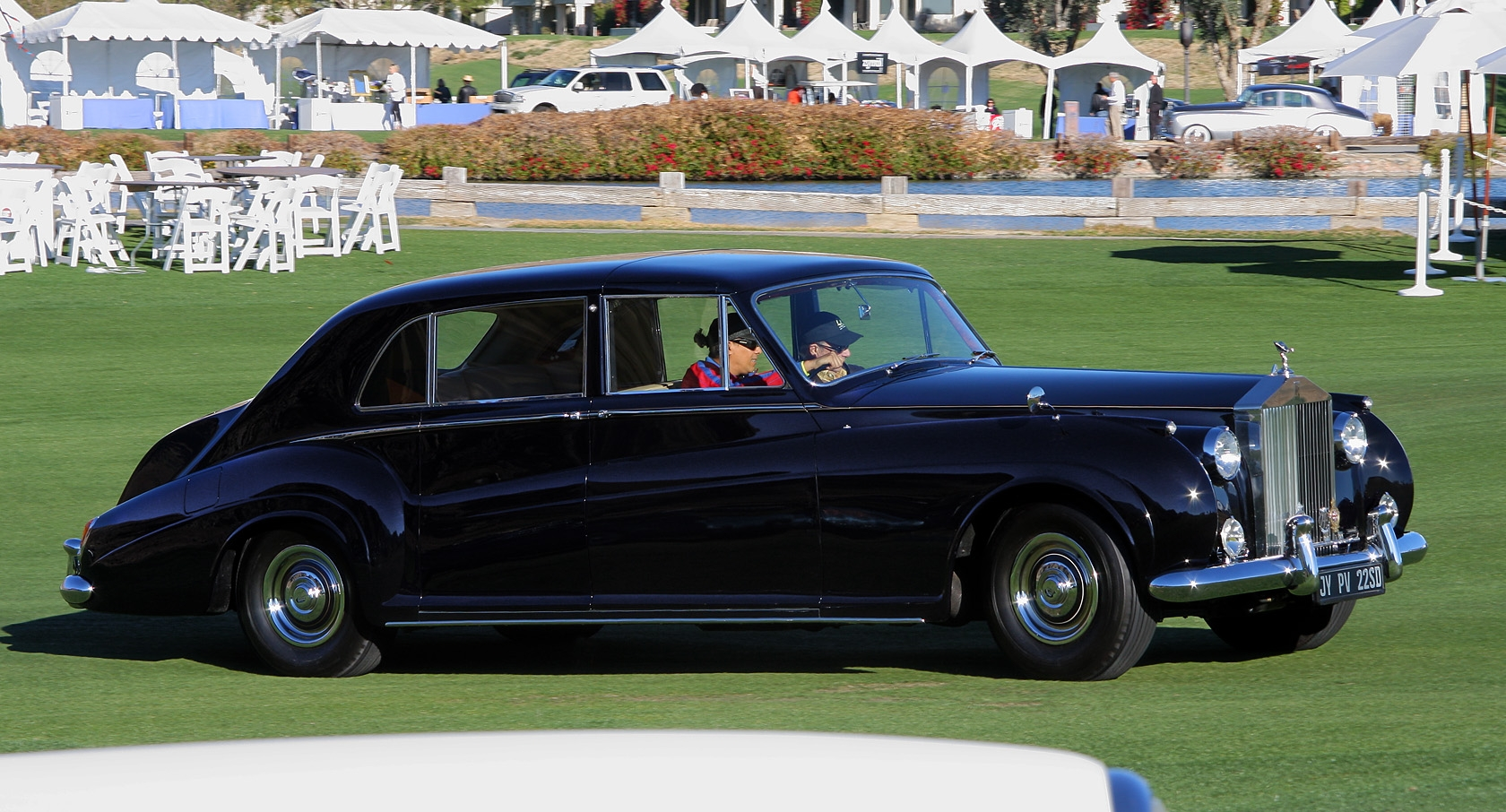
Sedanca de Ville by James Young, design number PV22SD

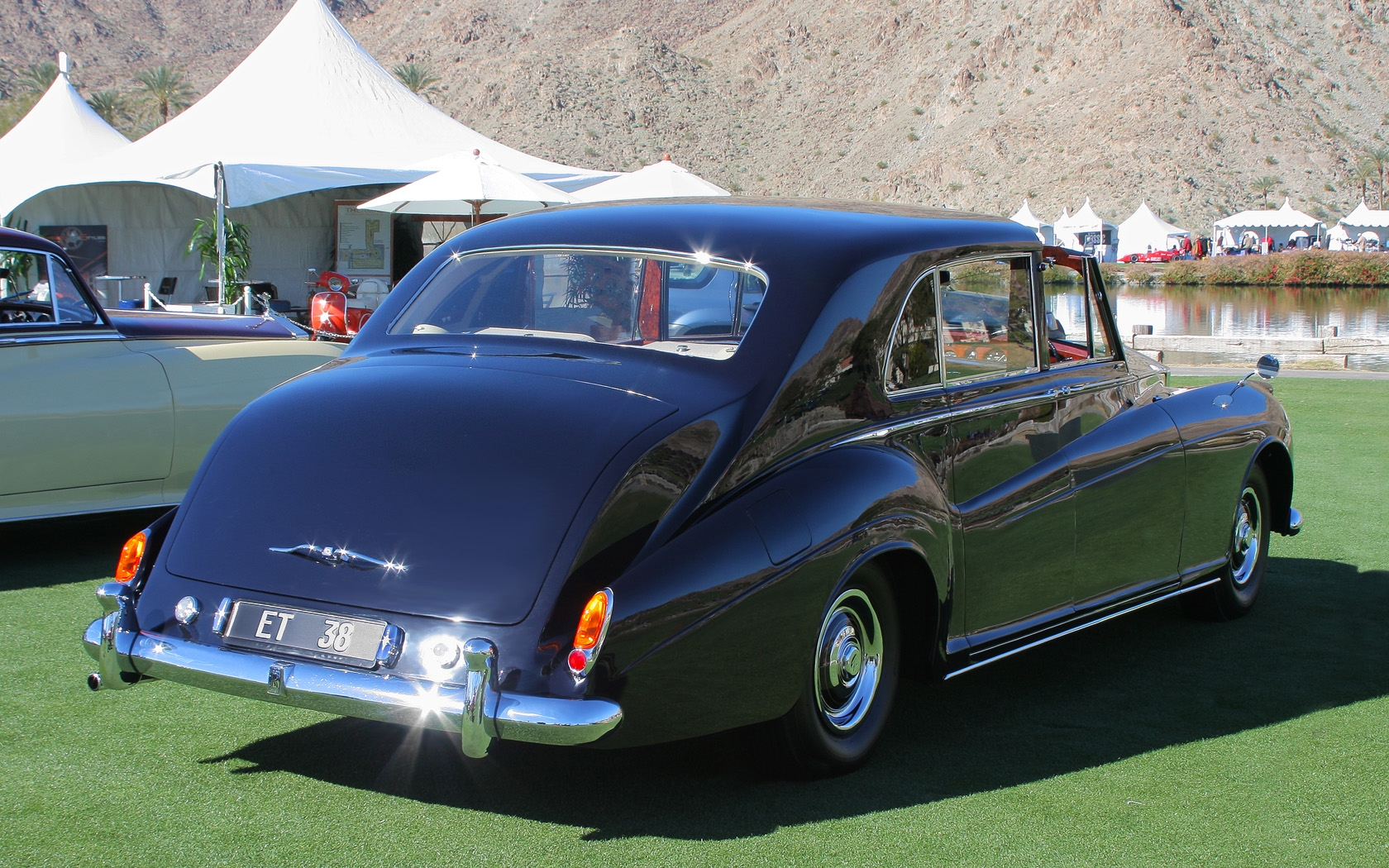
James Young right rear

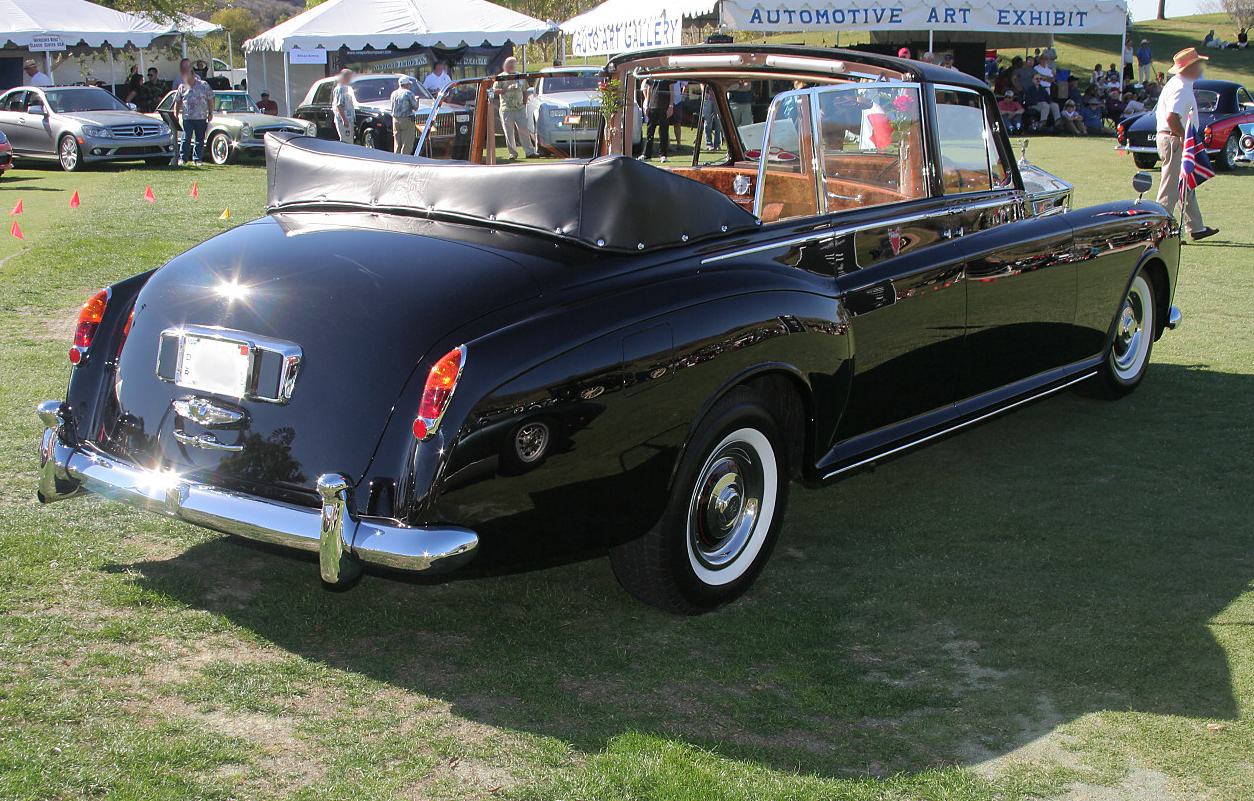
1967 State Landaulet by Mulliner Park Ward, design number 2052

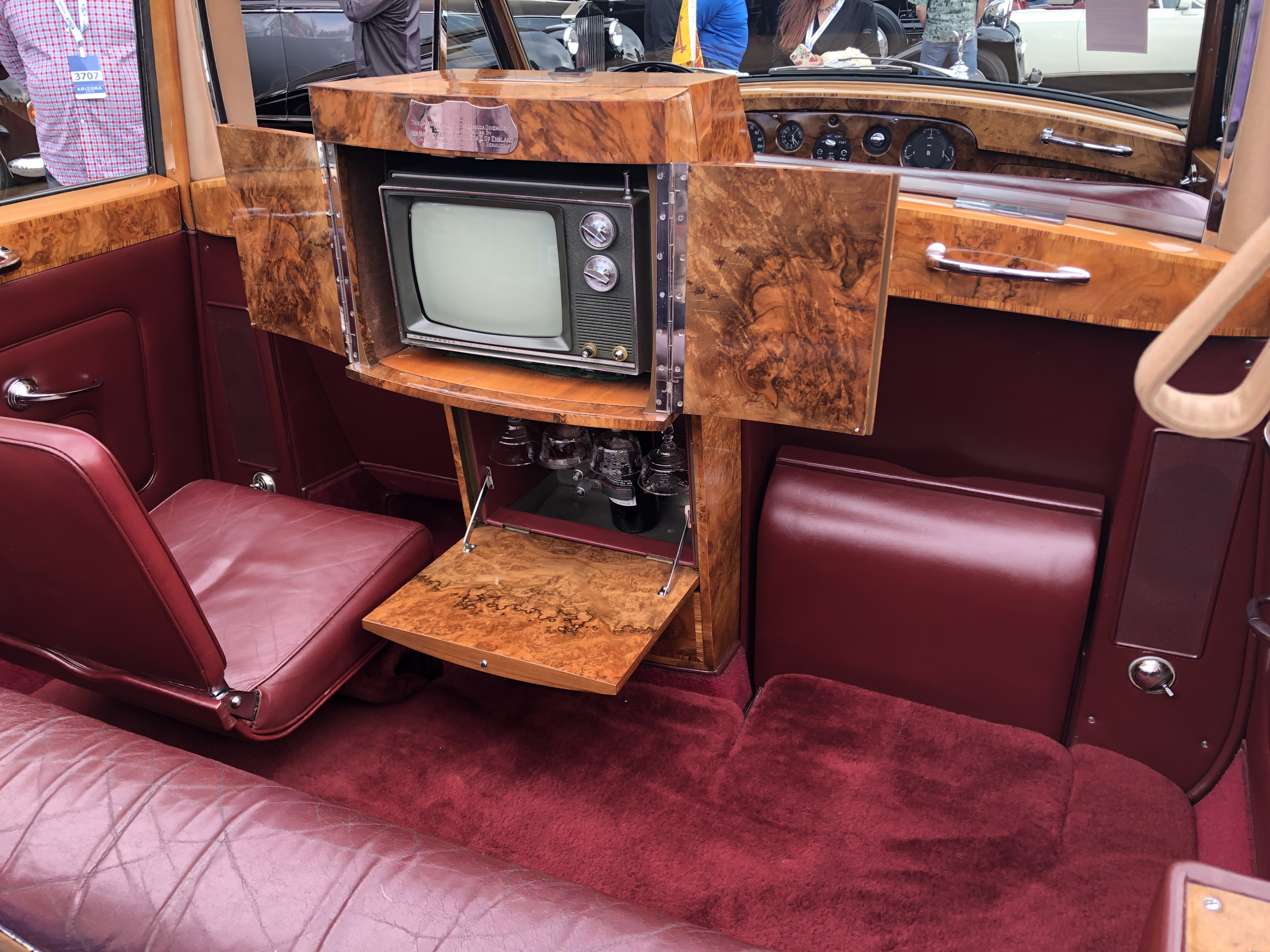
1967 Landaulet rear seat interior

== Famous owners ==
=== John Lennon ===
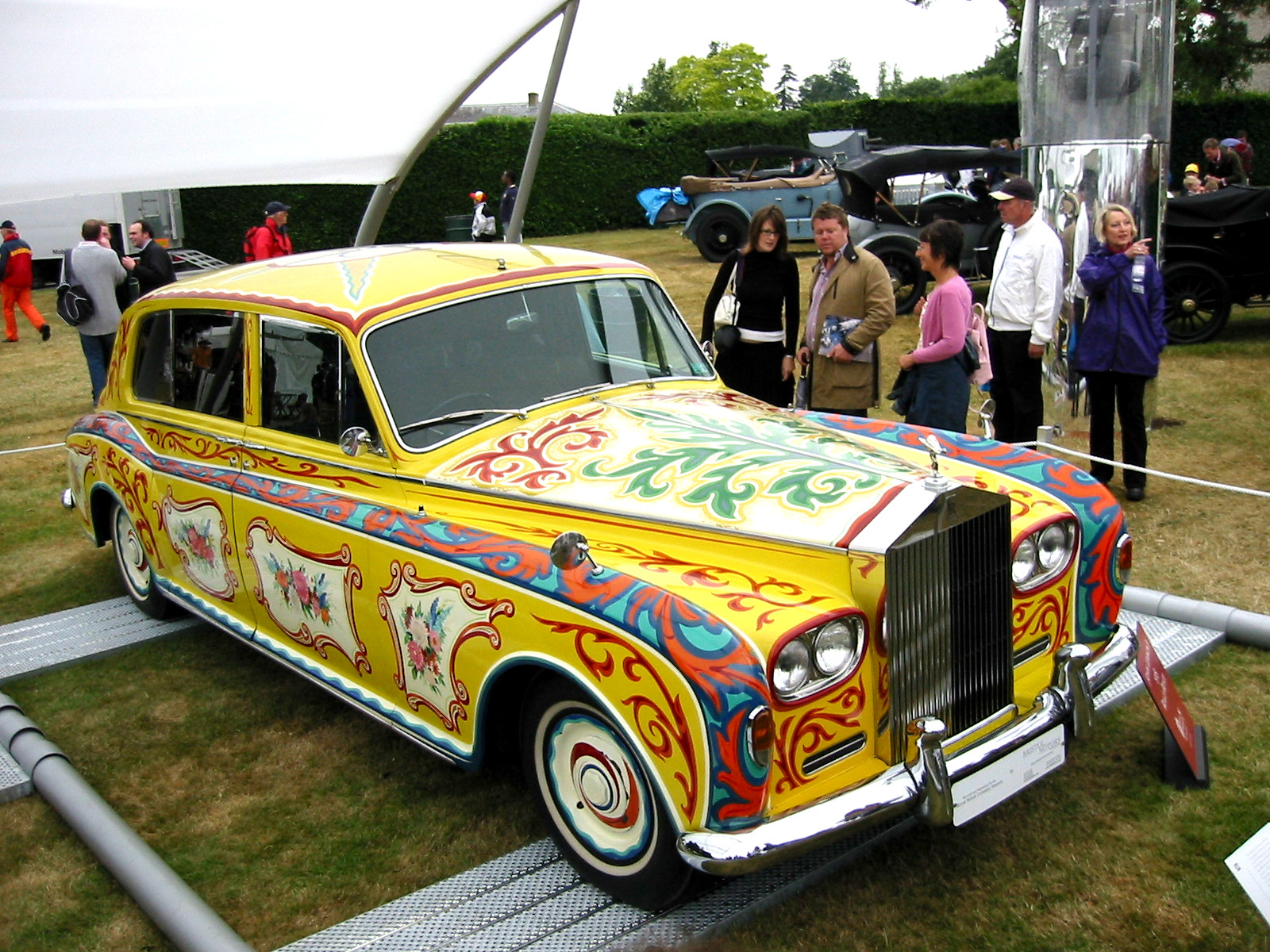
John Lennon's Phantom V, pictured in 2004

Beatle John Lennon bought a 1964 Mulliner Park Ward Phantom V, finished in Valentines Black. Everything was black except for the radiator, even the wheels. Lennon asked for the radiator to be black as well, but Rolls-Royce refused.

Originally the car was customised from Park Ward with black leather upholstery, cocktail cabinet with fine-wood trim, writing table, reading lamps, a seven-piece his-and-hers black-hide luggage set, and a Perdio portable television. A refrigeration system was put in the boot, and it was one of the first cars in England to have tinted windows. He probably paid £11,000 (nearly £210,000 in today's general inflation value). Lennon didn't know how to drive and didn't get his driving licence until 1965, at twenty-four years of age. He sometimes hired a 6'4" Welsh guardsman named Les Anthony as a chauffeur.

In December 1965, Lennon made a seven-page list of changes that cost more than £1900: the back seat could change into a double bed, a Philips Auto-Mignon AG2101 floating record player that prevented the needle from jumping, a Radio Telephone and a cassette tape deck were added, while speakers were mounted in the front wheel wells so that occupants could talk outside via microphone.

The car needed repainting after Lennon used it in 1960s Spain during his filming in Richard Lester's How I Won the War. Lennon commissioned coachmakers J.P. Fallon Ltd. to do so in the style of a Romany gypsy wagon (not "psychedelic" as often referenced). Artist Steve Weaver produced red, orange, green and blue swirls, floral side panels and a Libra on the roof.

Lennon was in a 60s mood and wanted to make a statement to the English establishment. He loved telling a story about an elderly woman who hit the car with her umbrella.

To match his later White Album period Lennon also bought another, all-white Phantom V in 1968.

In 1977 John Lennon's psychedelic Rolls-Royce was donated by him to the Cooper-Hewitt Museum at the Smithsonian Institution to cover an IRS bill of $250,000.

The Cooper-Hewitt Museum auctioned the car in 1985 at Sotheby's for $2,299,000 to Canadian businessman Jim Pattison, who donated it to the Province of British Columbia. It was on display during Expo 86 in Vancouver, and since 1993 it has been in the Royal British Columbia Museum in Canada.

=== Queen Elizabeth II ===
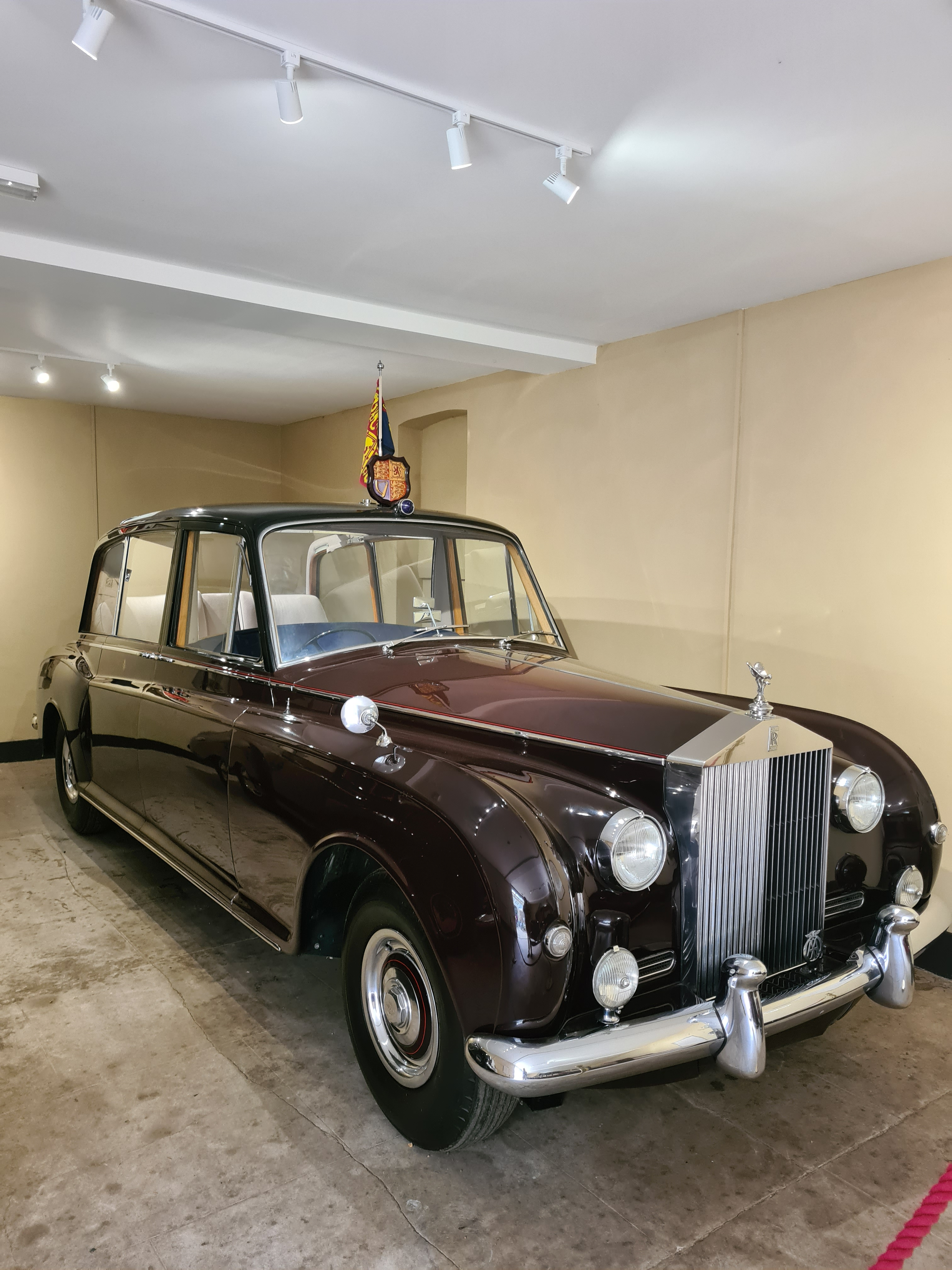
1961 Rolls-Royce Phantom V State Limousine at the Sandringham Museum.

Two cars built in 1960 and 1961 joined the British royal fleet of two earlier Rolls-Royce Phantom IVs. Having been retired from active service in 2002, both are now on public display: one in the royal motor museum at Sandringham, and the other in the special garage aboard HMY Britannia in Leith, Edinburgh. Queen Elizabeth, the Queen Mother acquired a Rolls-Royce Phantom V Landaulet (registration plate NLT 1) in 1962 which is now used by Charles III.

=== Others ===
==== Celebrities and tycoons ====
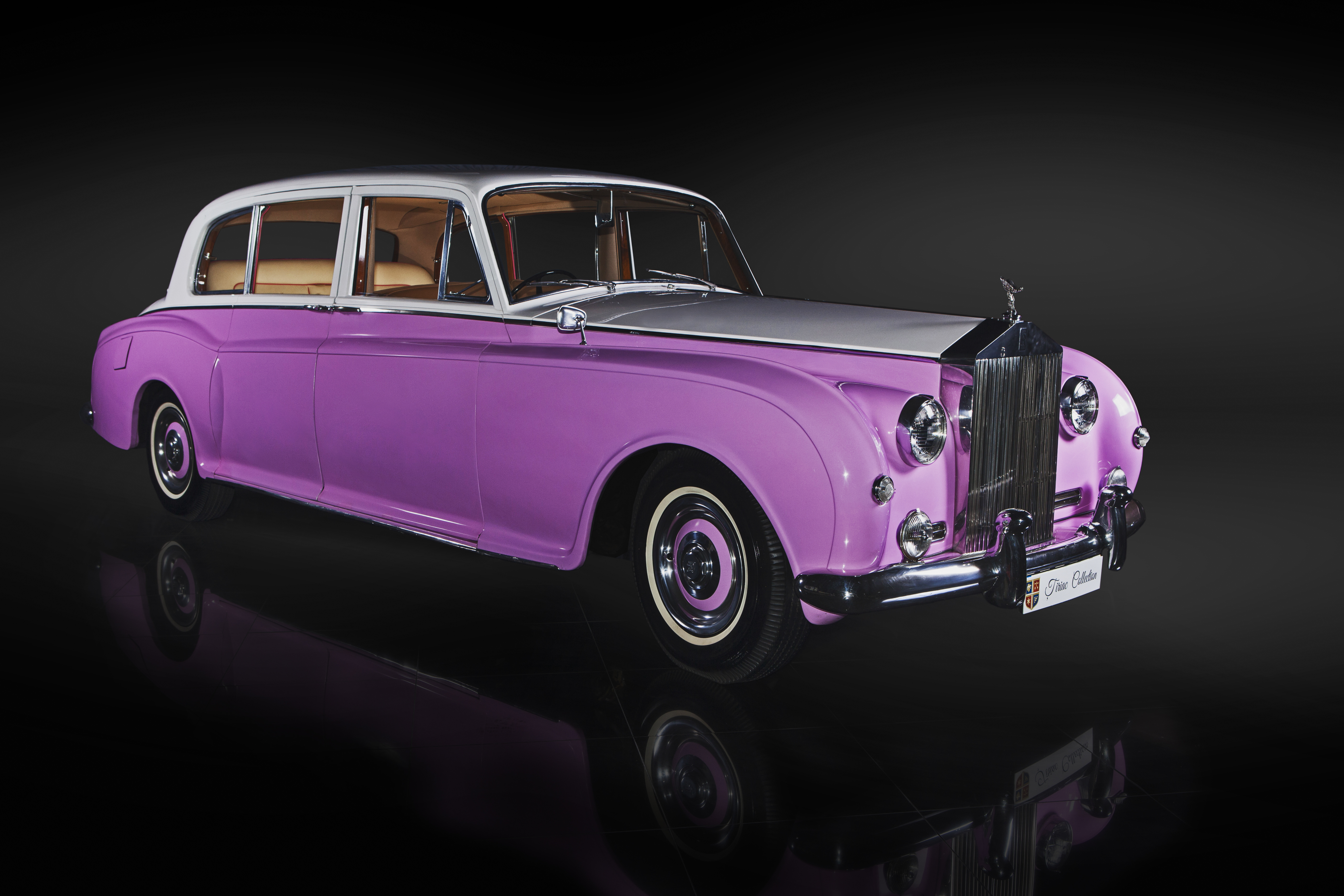
Elton John's 1960 Phantom V

Elton John had a pink 1960 Park Ward. This car is the namesake of, and is mentioned in, the Gorillaz song "The Pink Phantom", which features John.

Liberace had a 1961 that became a part of his show at the Las Vegas Hilton. It also appeared in the movie Behind the Candelabra

Elvis Presley had a 1963 James Young. It came with few extra options but did have a telephone, Firestone whitewall tyres, electric windows, and air conditioning. The centre rear armrest had a writing pad, mirror and clothes brush. An unusual feature was a microphone for the singer. It was originally painted Midnight blue, but Elvis had to repaint it a light silver as his mother's chickens kept pecking the paint.

==== Politicians and royalty ====
The Governor of Hong Kong Chris Patten used a Phantom V for ceremonial occasions. It transitioned to Tung Chee-hwa, the territory's Chief Executive, immediately following the handover to China on 1 July 1997.

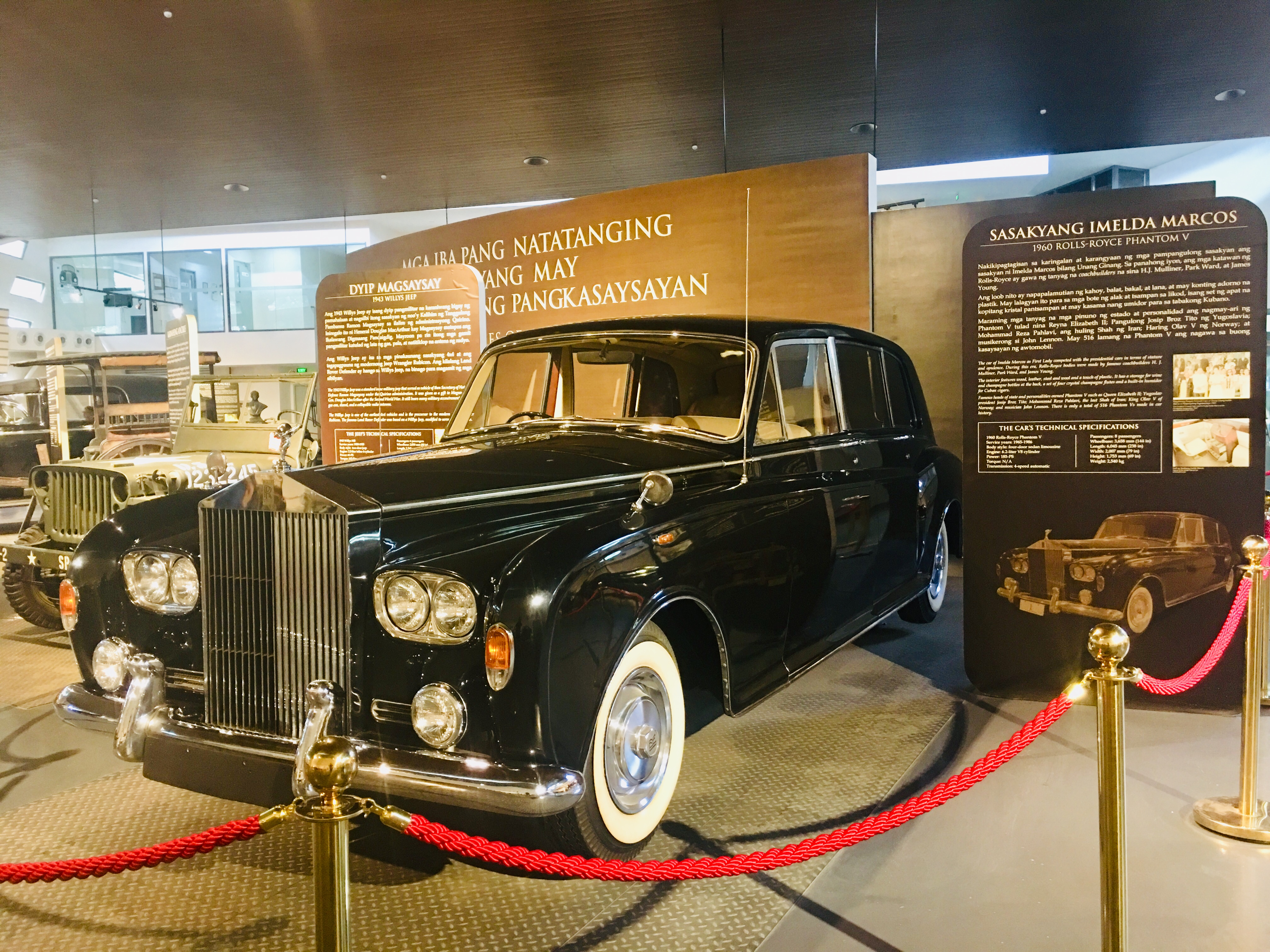
Imelda Marcos's 1960 Phantom V

The 1960 Phantom V of former Philippine First Lady Imelda Romualdez Marcos, wife of President Ferdinand Marcos, is currently displayed at the Philippine Presidential Car Museum.

Mohammad Reza Pahlavi, the Shah of Iran, owned a Phantom V. Since his exile, the car has been kept in his royal residence in Tehran and is occasionally shown to the public among the other luxurious cars owned by the Shah, including a unique Rolls-Royce Phantom IV and a Phantom VI.

Yugoslav president Josip Broz Tito had a 1960 Rolls-Royce Phantom V in presidential collection for representative purposes. The car is now displayed at the Museum of Yugoslavia, Belgrade.

Romanian dictator Nicolae Ceausescu bought a 1967 landaulet but returned it to Rolls-Royce upon the disapproval of the Politburo. It was used by Queen Elizabeth II on two-state visits.

=== List of notable Phantom V owners ===
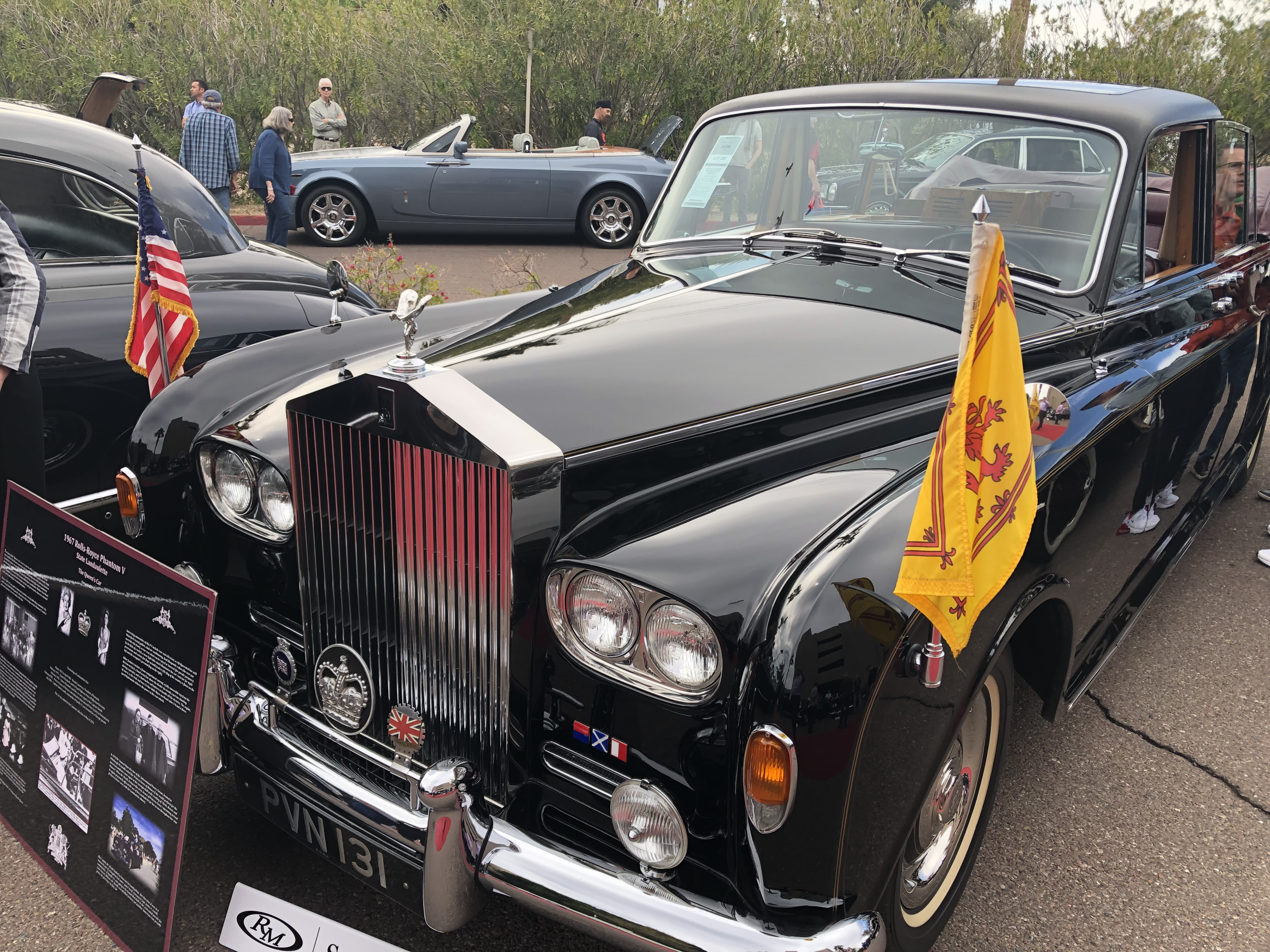
Nicolae Ceaușescu's 1967 landaulet

Celebrities

- Elton John
- Elvis Presley
- John Lennon
- Liberace

Politicians and royalty

- As official vehicles of the British Royal Household, used by:

Charles III
Elizabeth II
Queen Elizabeth The Queen Mother

- As the official vehicle of Governor of Hong Kong from 1961 - 1997 (representative of the British sovereign until 1997), used by

Murray MacLehose
Edward Youde
Chris Patten
David Wilson, Baron Wilson of Tillyorn

- Imelda Marcos
- Josip Broz Tito
- Mohammad Reza Pahlavi
- Nicolae Ceausescu
