= Rolls-Royce Silver Cloud =

Luxury saloon produced by Rolls-Royce

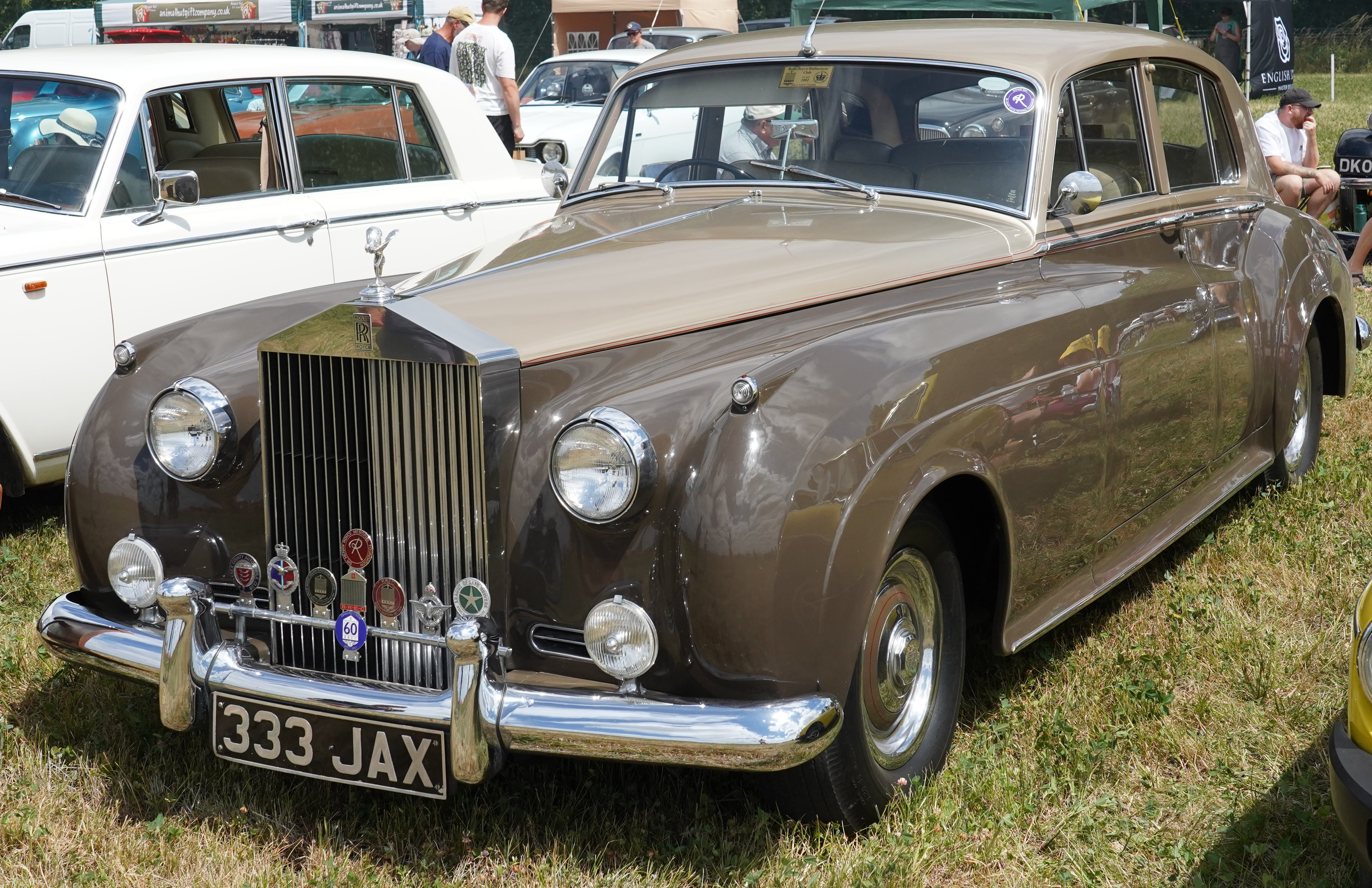

Overview
- Manufacturer: Rolls-Royce Ltd
- Production: April 1955 – March 1966; 7,372 produced
- Assembly: United Kingdom: Crewe, England
- Designer: John P. Blatchley

Body and chassis
- Layout: FR layout

Powertrain
- Engine: Mk.I: 4.9 L (300 cu in) I6; Mk.II & III: 6.2 L (380 cu in) V8
- Transmission: 4-speed automatic

Dimensions
- Kerb weight: 4,647 lb (2,108 kg)

Chronology
- Predecessor: Silver Dawn
- Successor: Silver Shadow

The Rolls-Royce Silver Cloud is a luxury automobile produced by Rolls-Royce Limited from April 1955 to March 1966. It was the core model of the Rolls-Royce range during that period. The Silver Cloud replaced the Silver Dawn and was, in turn, replaced by the Silver Shadow. The John P. Blatchley design was a major change from the pre-war models and the highly derivative Silver Dawn. As part of a range rationalisation, the Bentley S1 was made essentially identical, apart from its radiator grille and badging.

== Models ==
=== Silver Cloud ===
Silver Cloud I
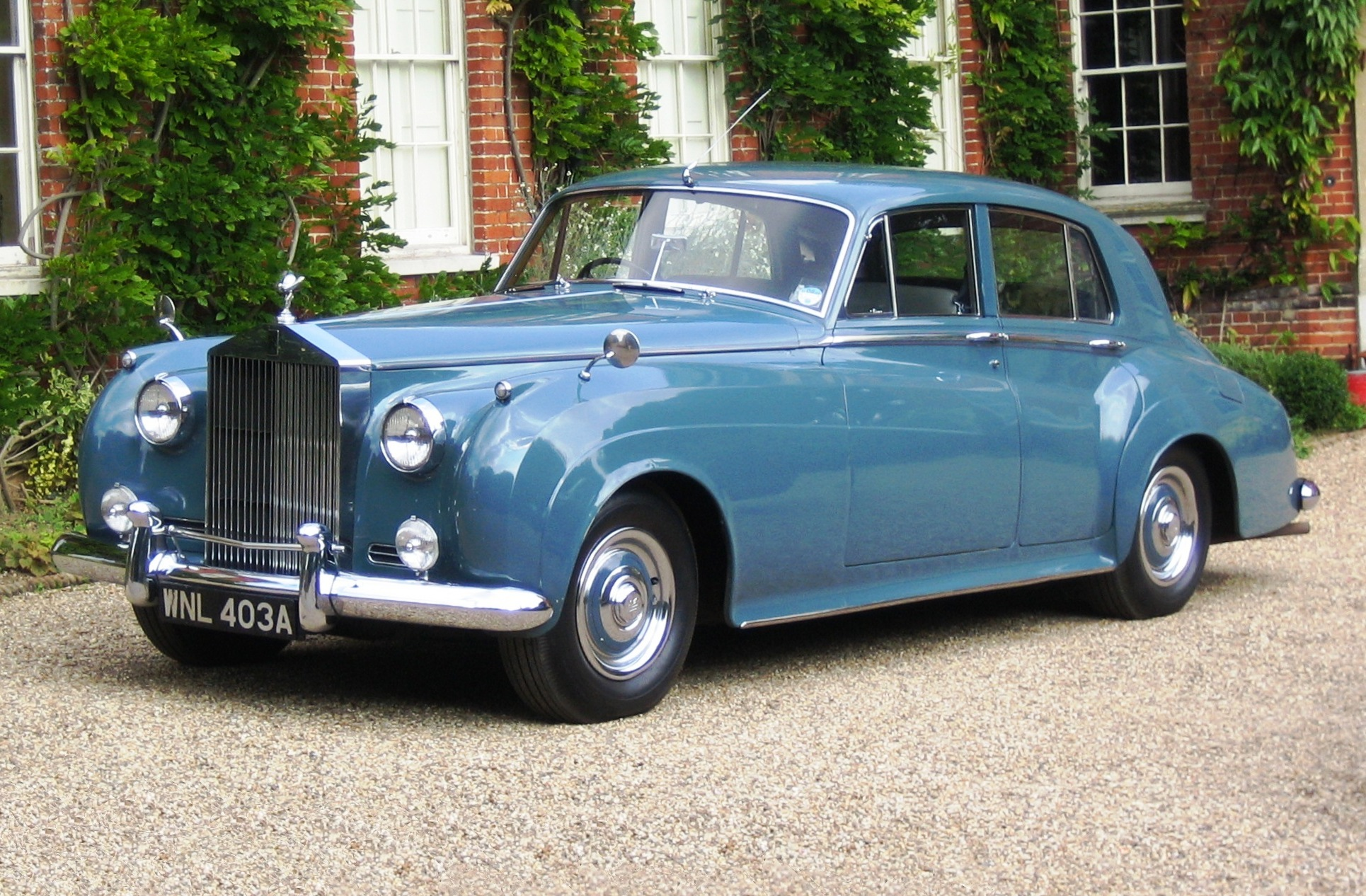

Overview
- Production: 1955–1958; 2,238 produced

Body and chassis
- Body style: 4-door saloon variations provided by coachbuilders were: 2-door convertible 2-door coupé
- Related: Bentley S1

Powertrain
- Engine: 4.9 L (300 cu in) I6
- Transmission: 4 speed GM Hydramatic automatic

Dimensions
- Wheelbase: 123 in (3,124 mm) (short-wheelbase); 127 in (3,226 mm) (long wheelbase, offered for 1957 and 1958 cars)
- Length: 212 in (5,385 mm)
- Width: 74.75 in (1,899 mm)
- Height: 64 in (1,626 mm)

Construction is body-on-frame, which permitted special bodied versions, though the overwhelming majority were built with the standard Pressed Steel Company manufactured steel body shell. A light-weight aluminium alloy was used for doors, bonnet/hood and boot/trunk lid. The chassis is a simple steel box section, welded together and very rigid. The car is 5.38 m (212 in) long, 1.90 m (75 in) wide, and weighs 1.95 tonnes. The engine is a 155 hp / 4000 rpm 4.9 L (300 cu in) six-cylinder unit with inlet over exhaust valves: twin SU carburettors were added in September 1957.

The standard transmission was a four-speed automatic, the General Motors designed Hydramatic transmission. Rolls-Royce manuals and literature did not use the Hydramatic name, instead referring to the transmission as the "Automatic Gearbox."

The turning circle was 41 feet 8 inches (12.70 m).

Brakes are hydraulic and assisted by the Rolls-Royce mechanical servo with 11 in (279 mm) drums and suspension was independent coils at the front and semi-elliptic springs at the rear. Twin brake master cylinders were incorporated from April 1956.

Power steering and air conditioning became available as options in 1956.

A long-wheelbase version lengthened by 4 in (102 mm) was also made available in September 1957, outwardly very similar to the existing car but offering improved leg space for rear-seat passengers.

The British Motor magazine tested a standard-wheelbase factory-bodied Series I in 1956 recording a top speed of 102.9 mph (165.6 km/h) and acceleration from 0-60 mph (97 km/h) in 13.5 seconds and a fuel consumption of 14.5 miles per imperial gallon (19.5 L/100 km; 12.1 mpg_{‑US}). The test car cost £5078 including taxes.

The coachbuilder Harold Radford offered conversions of the 4-door saloon into an estate car. One of these conversions, chassis no. LSMH65, sold in March 2017 for $583,000 (inclusive of applicable buyer's fee) at RM Sotheby's Amelia Island auction.

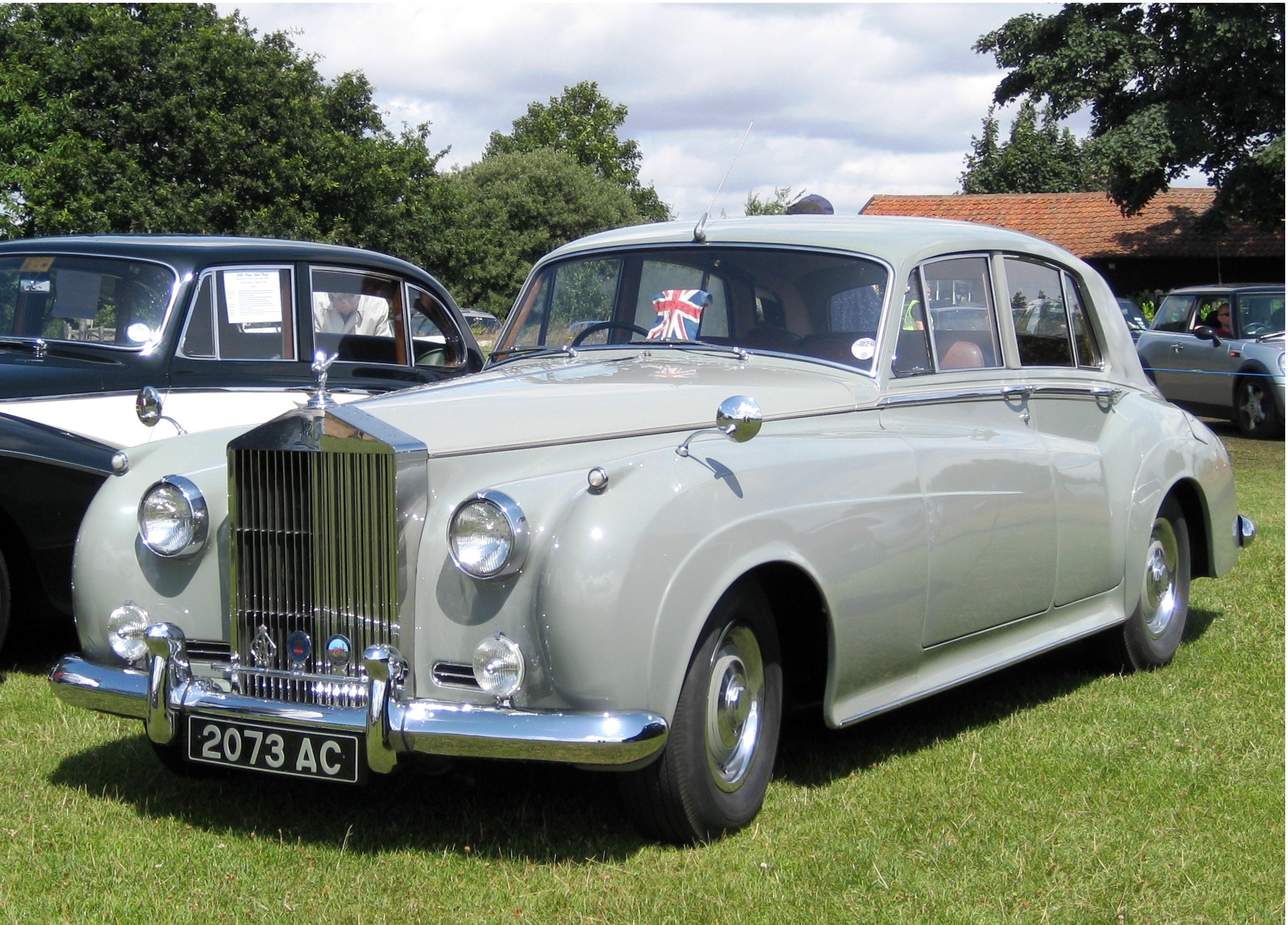
Silver Cloud I saloon

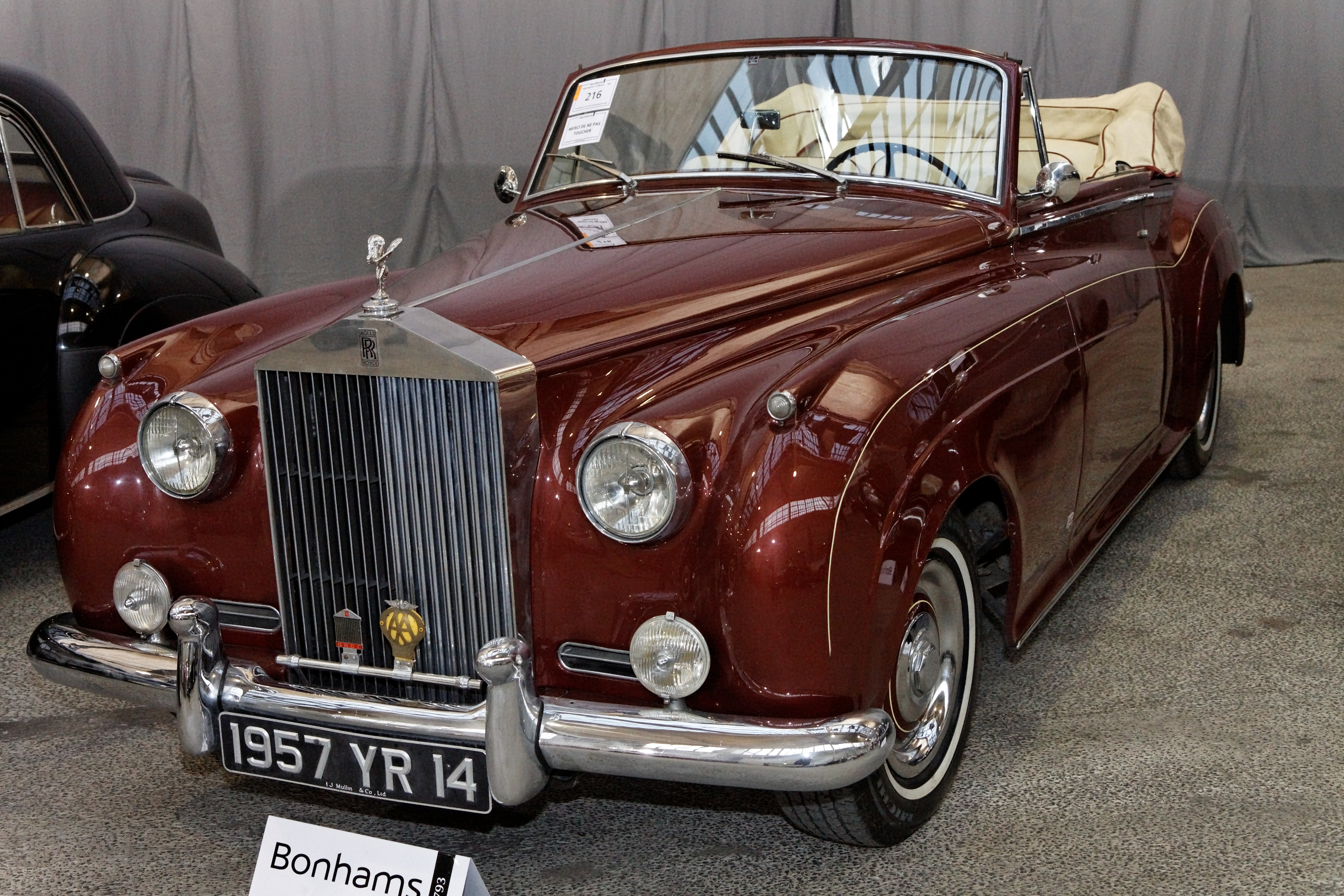
1957 Silver Cloud I drophead coupé

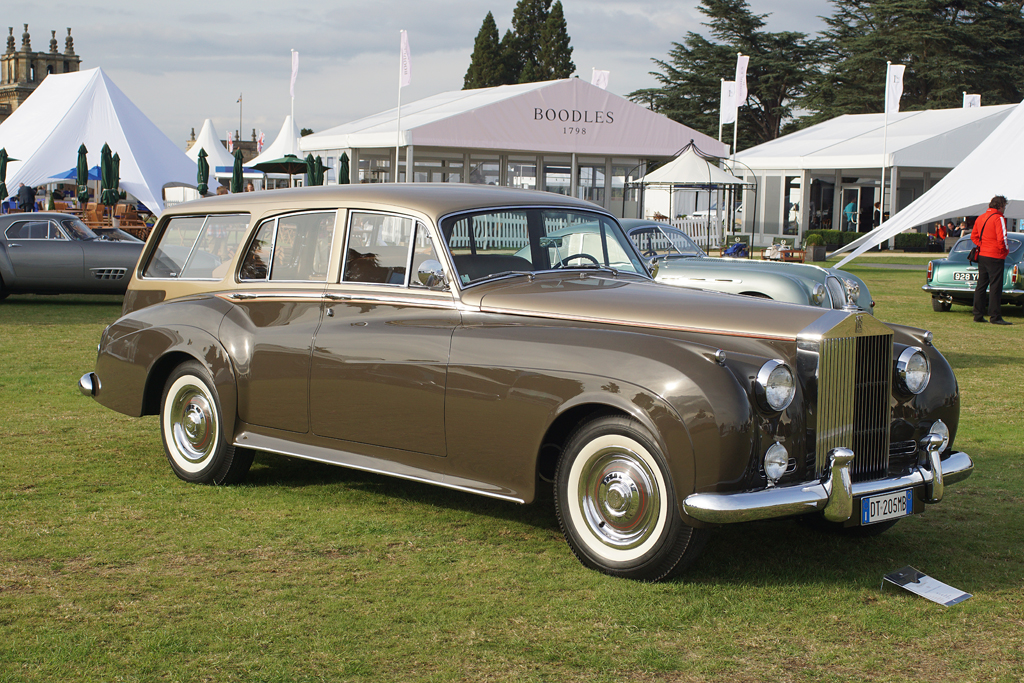
Silver Cloud I Estate Car by H.J. Mulliner

=== Silver Cloud II ===
Silver Cloud II
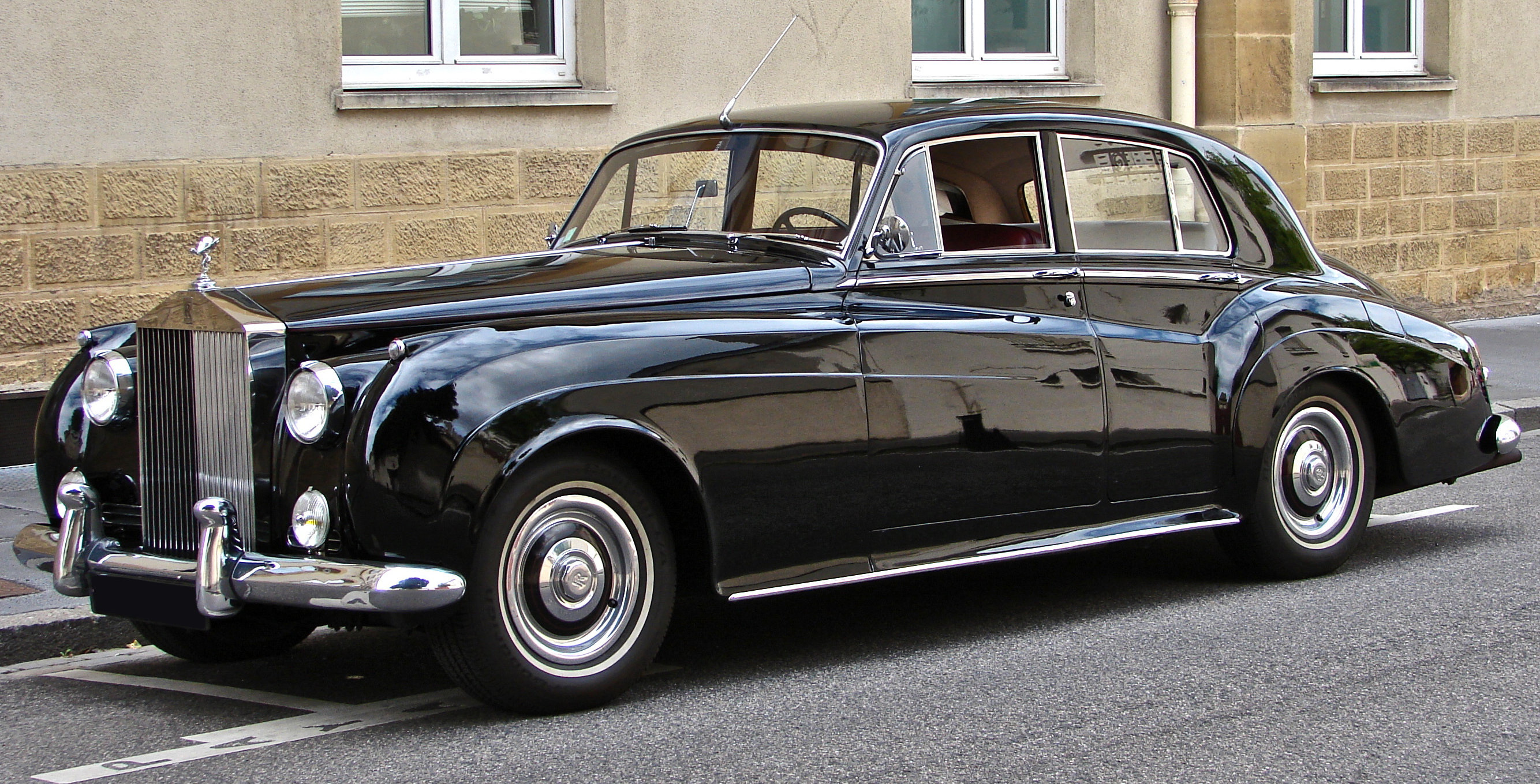

Overview
- Production: 1959–1962; 2,417 produced

Body and chassis
- Body style: 4-door saloon Variations provided by coachbuilders were: 2-door convertible 2-door coupé
- Related: Bentley S2

Powertrain
- Engine: 6.2 L (380 cu in) V8

Dimensions
- Wheelbase: 123 in (3,124 mm) (short-wheelbase); 127 in (3,226 mm) (long wheelbase)
- Length: 213 in (5,410 mm)
- Width: 74.75 in (1,899 mm)
- Height: 64 in (1,626 mm)

The Silver Cloud II was introduced in 1959. It was little changed externally, but was given a new Rolls-Royce developed 6.2 L V8 engine, which pushed the weight to 2.11 tonnes. Performance was greatly improved and top speed was raised to 183 km/h (114 mph), but the main improvements were in acceleration and torque. Power steering became standard. Electrically operated windows were now available as an option.

Although the improved performance of the new car was welcomed, commentators of the time noted that the V8-engined Silver Cloud II was neither as quiet nor as smooth as the straight-six-cylinder-engined Silver Cloud I, despite the new engine's hydraulic tappet operation. The new wet-linered V8 was also a little cramped in an engine bay intended originally for a narrower unit: in order to change the spark plugs it was necessary to remove the front wheel on the car's right side. There seems to have been a problem with crankshaft breakages in the earlier V8s: this was blamed on lack of lubrication to the bearings.

The basic architecture of the Silver Cloud II did not change between 1959 and 1963, but there were numerous minor changes implemented, notable among them a succession of improvements to the ventilation system. Interior changes in 1961 included the adoption of blue instrument lighting, the introduction of a combined indicator / headlamp flasher switch and of a handbrake warning light. A remodelled rear light assembly was introduced in May 1962 and a change to single sealed-beam headlamps was made in August 1962.

The Motor magazine tested a Series II in 1960. They recorded a top speed of 104.7 mph (168.5 km/h), acceleration from 0-60 mph (97 km/h) in 10.9 seconds and a fuel consumption of 13 miles per imperial gallon (22 L/100 km; 11 mpg_{‑US}). The test car cost £6092 including taxes.

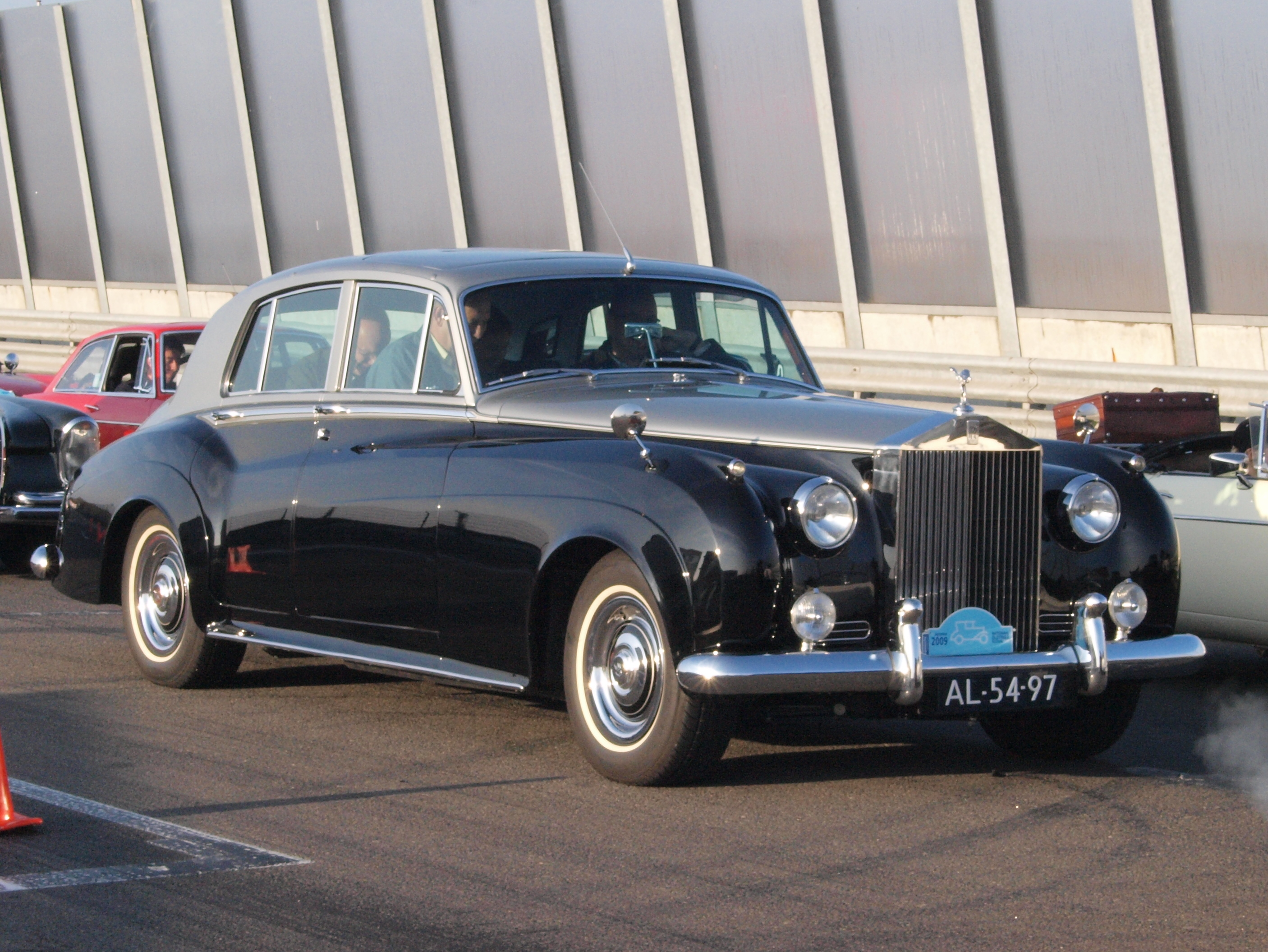
Silver Cloud II saloon

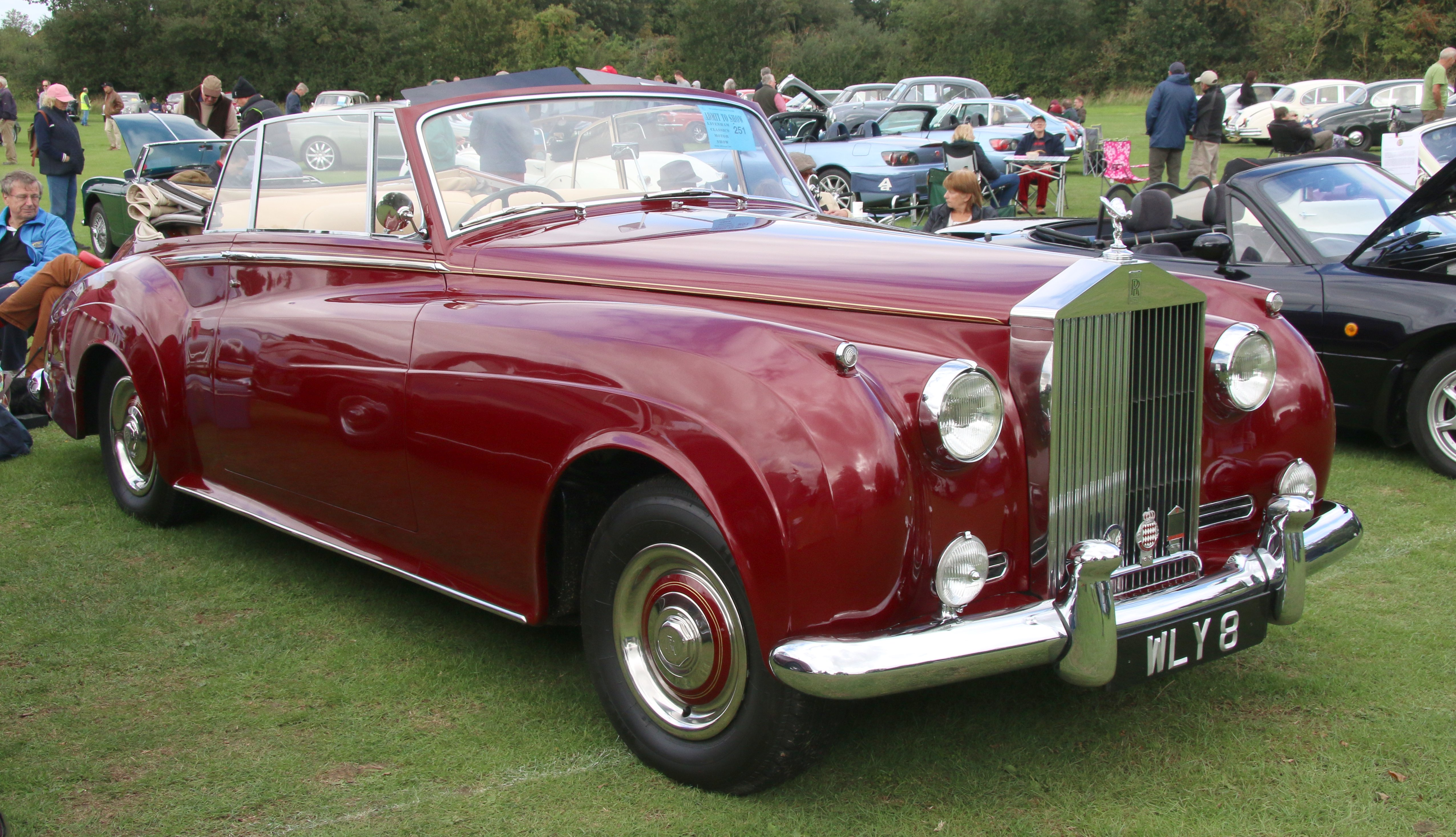
Silver Cloud II drophead coupé

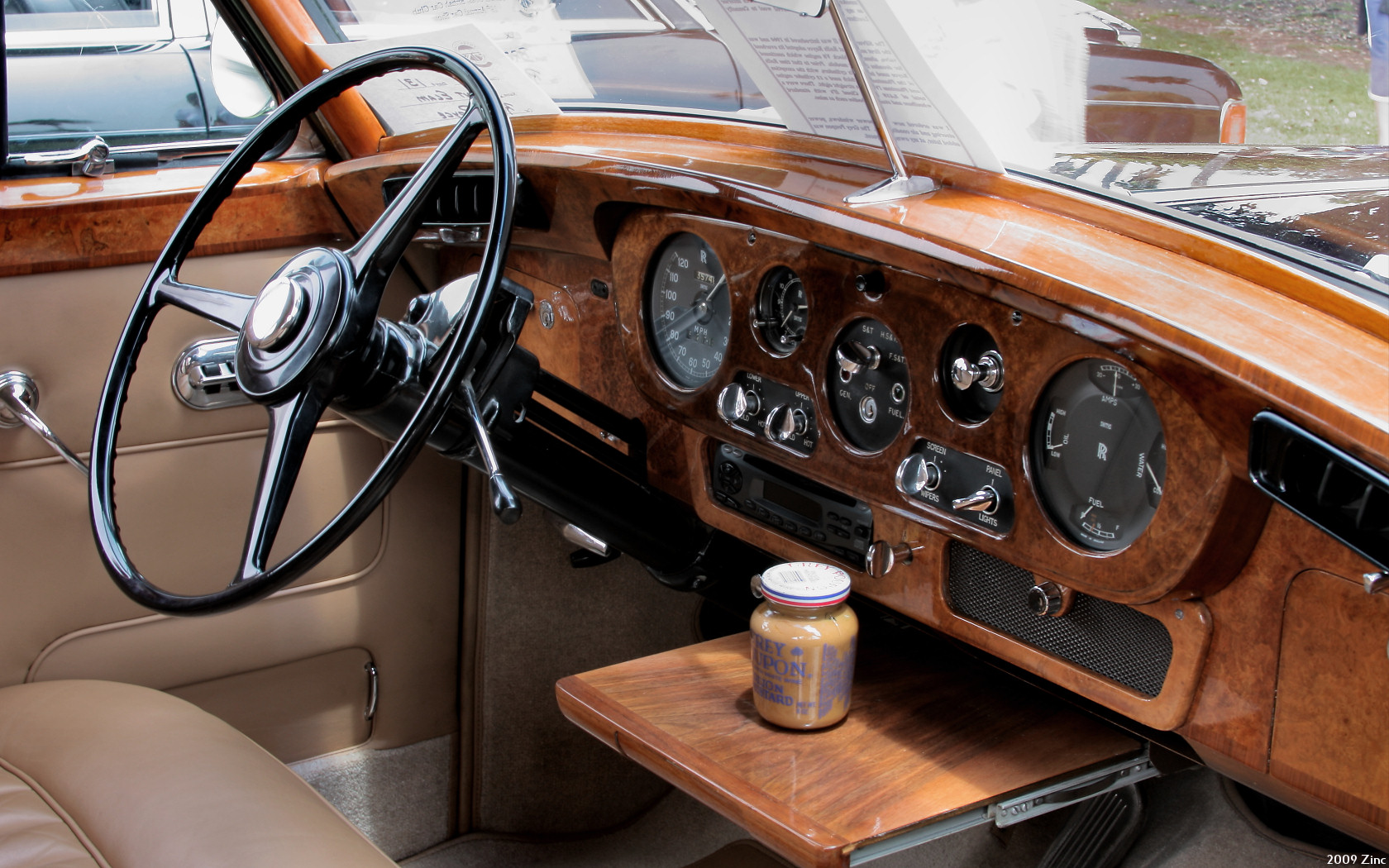
Silver Cloud II interior

=== Silver Cloud III ===
Silver Cloud III
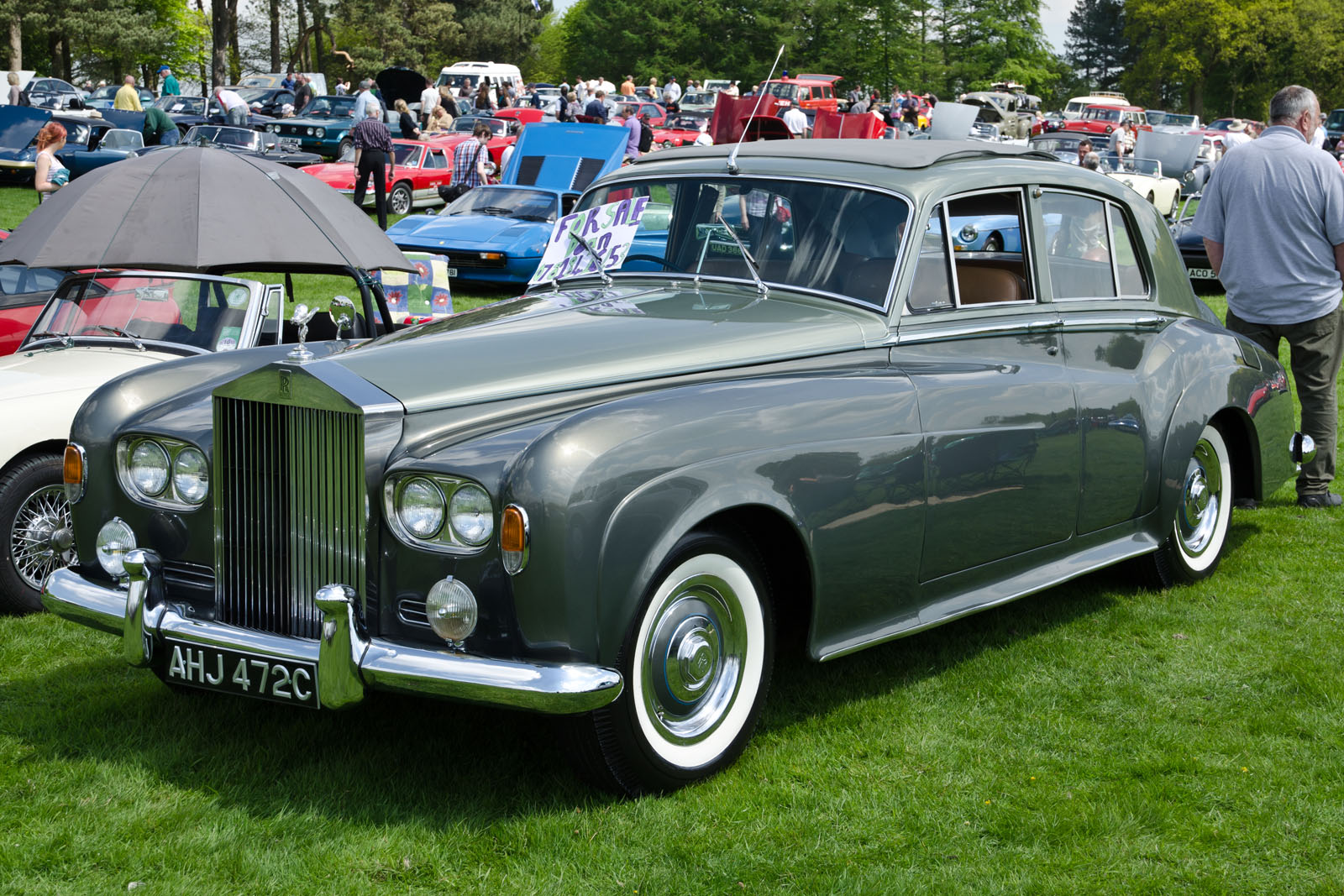

Overview
- Production: 1963–1966; 2,044 produced

Body and chassis
- Body style: 4-door saloon Variations provided by coachbuilders were: 2-door convertible 2-door coupé
- Related: Bentley S3

Powertrain
- Engine: 6.2 L (380 cu in) V8 220HP (estimate)

Dimensions
- Wheelbase: 127 in (3,226 mm)
- Length: 211.7 in (5,377 mm)
- Width: 74 in (1,880 mm)
- Height: 68 in (1,727 mm)

The Silver Cloud III was first displayed to the public at the Paris salon at the beginning of October 1962 but along with the Bentley S3 the cars were displayed on a specialist coachwork stand as if the modifications were to the special order of a particular customer. (Note: The French government had suddenly decreed that all French products should be displayed together in the most prominent positions and the Rolls-Royce retreat to a remote stand was to show their displeasure.) External dimensions were slightly altered, the interior remodelled, the weight reduced by a little over 100 kg (220 lb) and improvements made to the engine which included fitting 2-inch (51 mm) SU carburettors in place of the 1 3/4 inch units used on the Series II Silver Cloud.

The compression ratio was increased to 9:1, reflecting the higher octane levels of premium fuel in major markets, although the option of a lower 8:1 compression ratio was still offered in markets where non-availability of higher octane fuels might be an issue. Rolls-Royce, as before, refused to disclose overall engine power output, but indicated that there had been an improvement of "perhaps 7%". Increased power and weight reduction boosted speed and performance slightly. The engine now included a nitride hardened crankshaft to reflect the extra power being generated and in response to reports of broken crankshafts in the earlier V8 Silver Clouds. The transmission was a GM Hydramatic which Rolls-Royce used under licence.

The headlights were grouped in a four-headlamp layout subsequently continued in the later Silver Shadow. Other external changes included a slightly increased slope of the bonnet to correspond with a 1 1/2 inches (3.8 cm) reduction in radiator grille height.

Between 1963 and 1966 there were no major changes. Stainless steel wheel trims replaced chrome-plated ones in April 1963, and an improved rear window demister was introduced in November of the same year. Wider front seats were fitted in January 1964, and five months later a revised headlamp surround now incorporated a very small RR monogram. A chrome badge reading "Silver Cloud III" in an italic font can be seen on the right bottom side of the boot of most UK and European delivered examples, whilst US versions were delivered without this badge.

As with earlier models, Rolls-Royce continued to make the Silver Cloud chassis available to traditional coachbuilders. A notable version is the Fixed Head and Drop Head Coupe styled by Mulliner Park Ward, having unusual slanted headlights, also found on contemporary Italian designed or Italian-influenced high performance cars from Lancia, Triumph, Lagonda and Gordon-Keeble. It was derived from the earlier Park Ward design for the Bentley S1 and S2 Continentals, made also available for the S3. Some 100 of the 328 coach-built Silver Cloud IIIs were of this style.

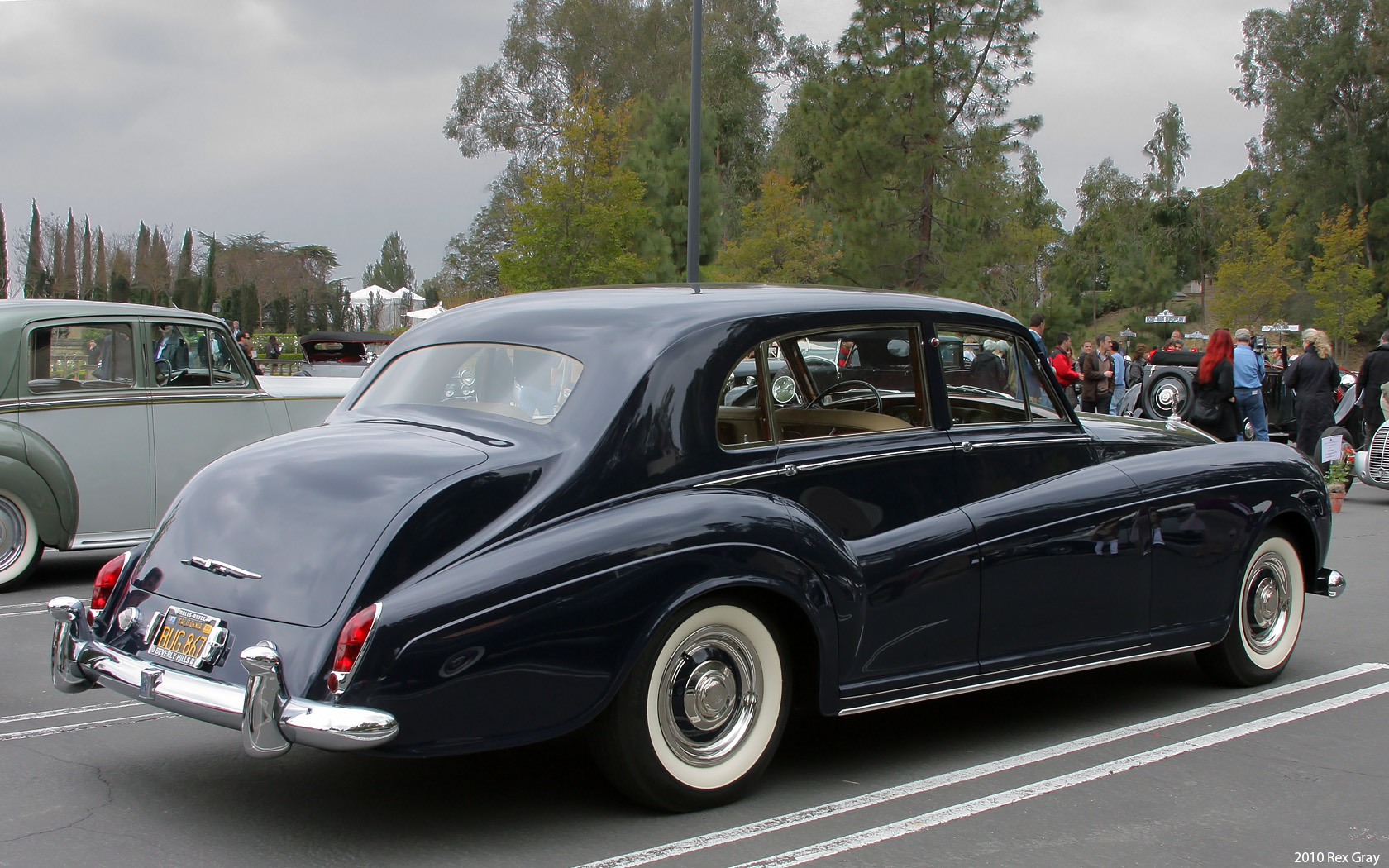
1963 Silver Cloud III James Young
long wheelbase saloon

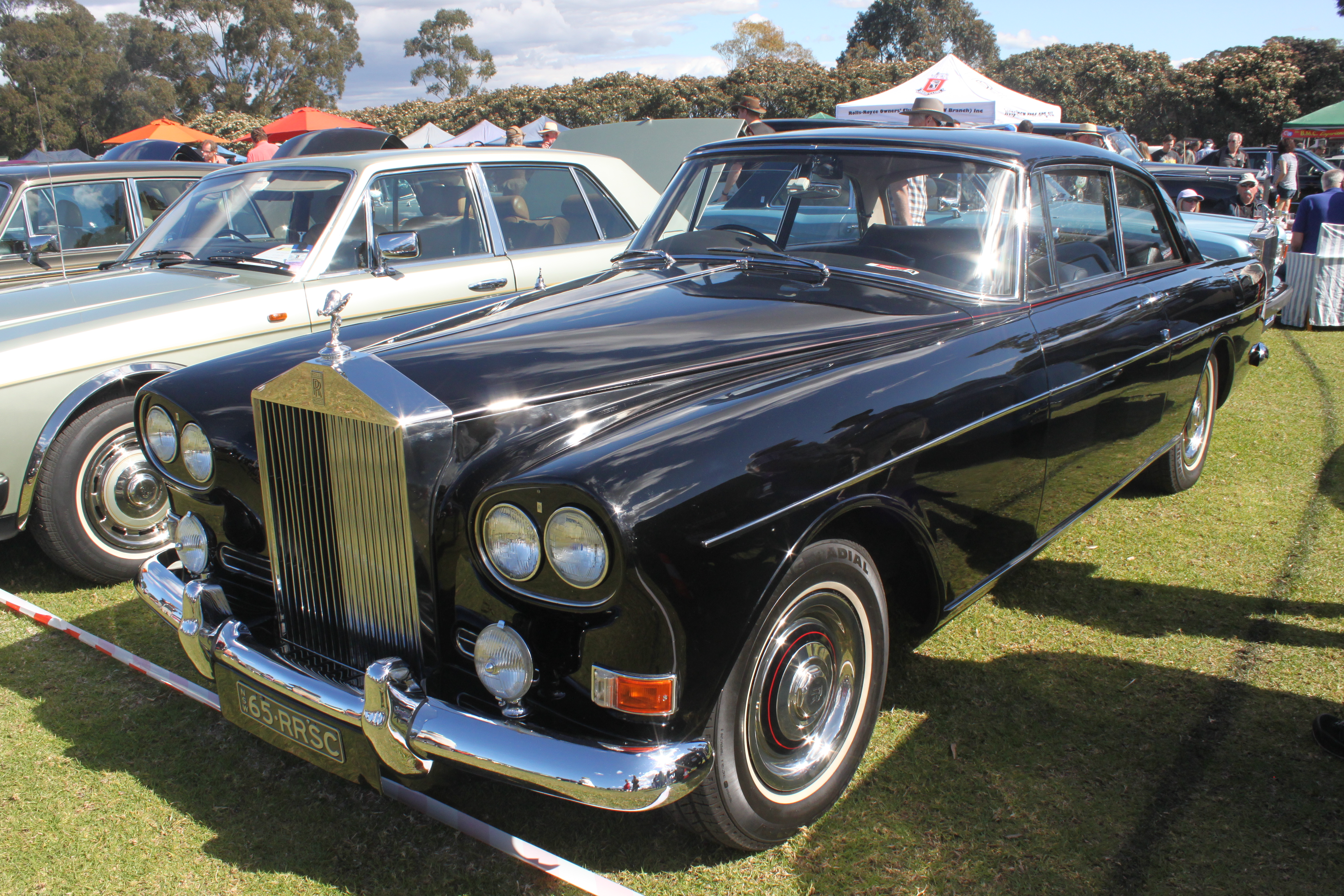
1965 Silver Cloud III Mulliner Park Ward fixed head coupé

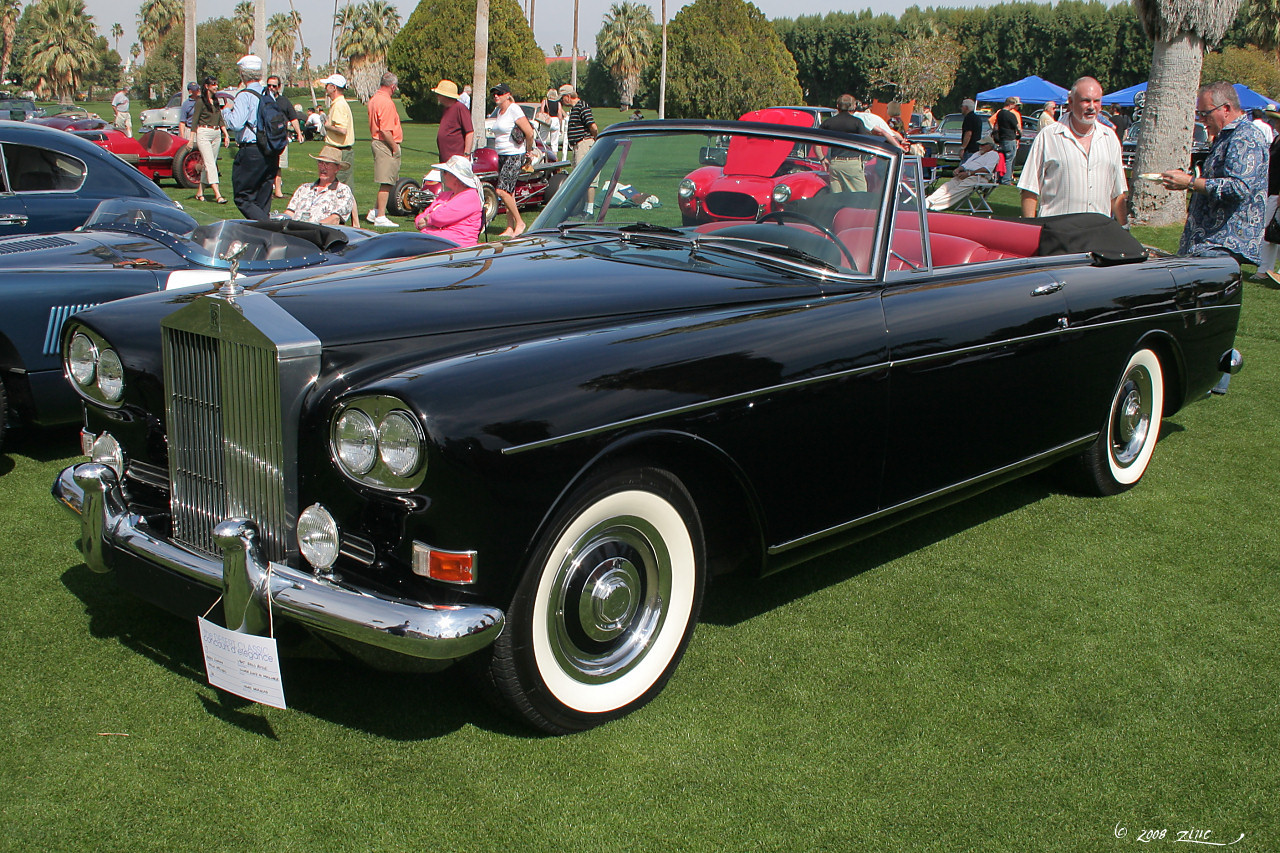
1960s Silver Cloud III Mulliner Park Ward drophead coupé

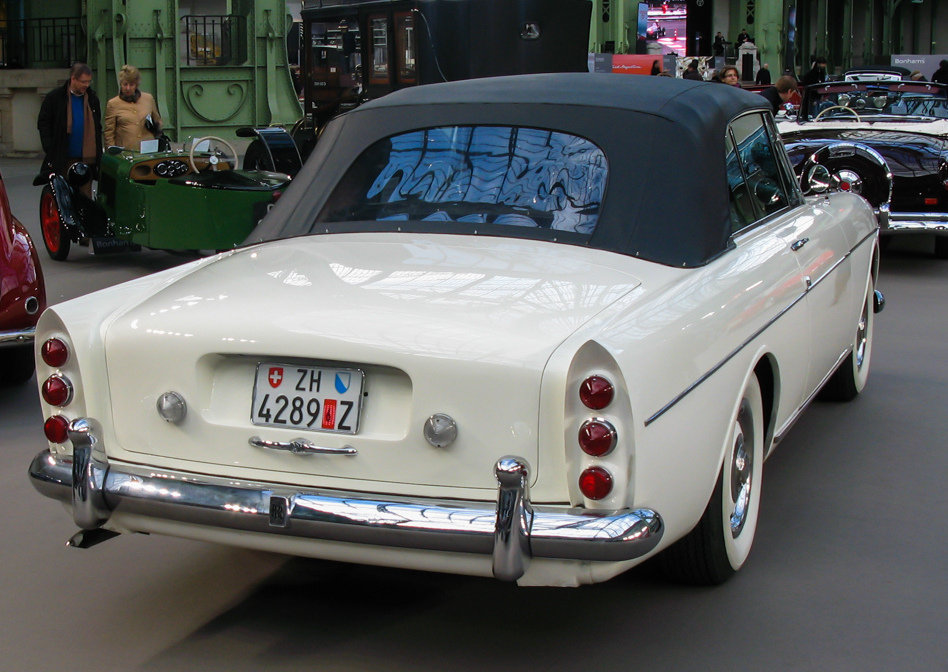
1966 Silver Cloud III Mulliner Park Ward drophead coupé

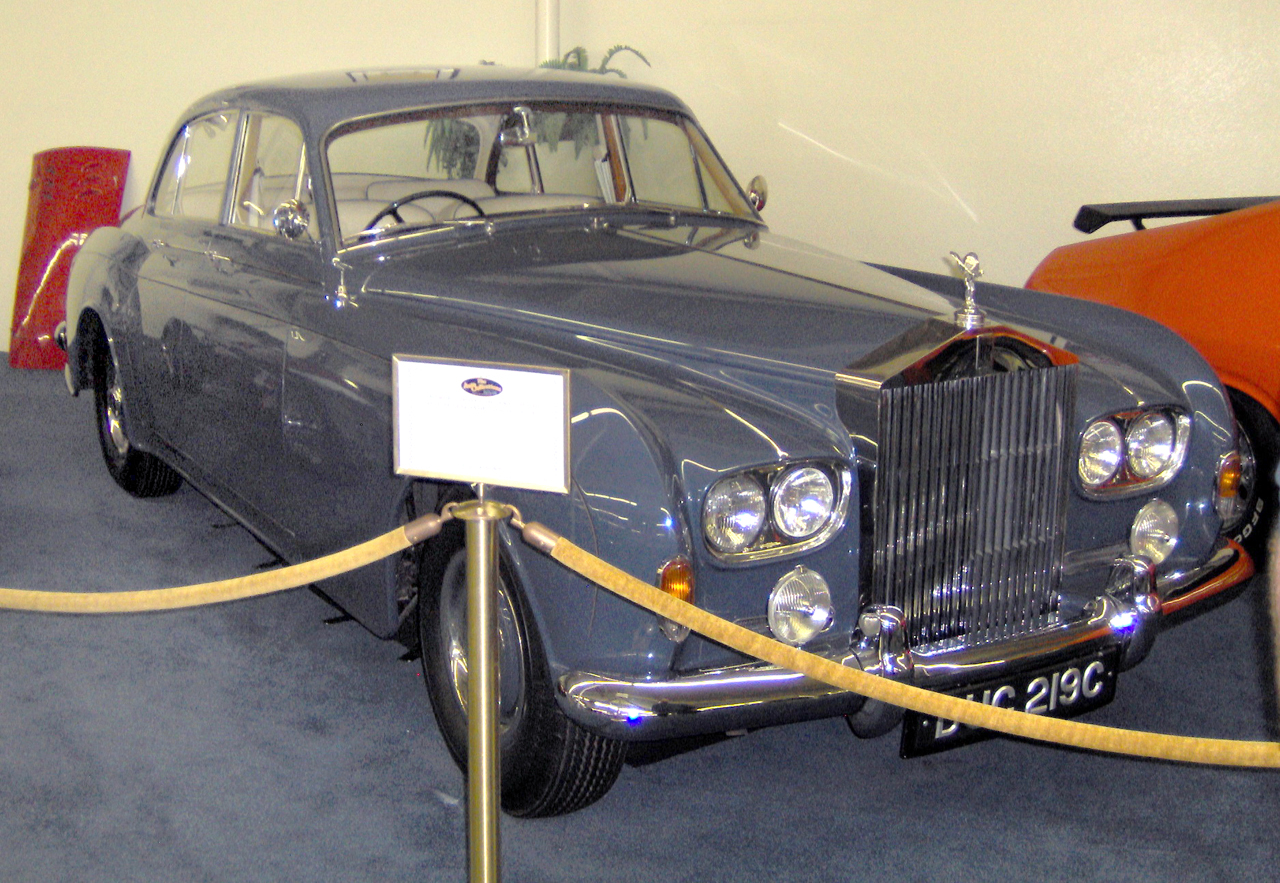
1965 Silver Cloud III James Young
saloon

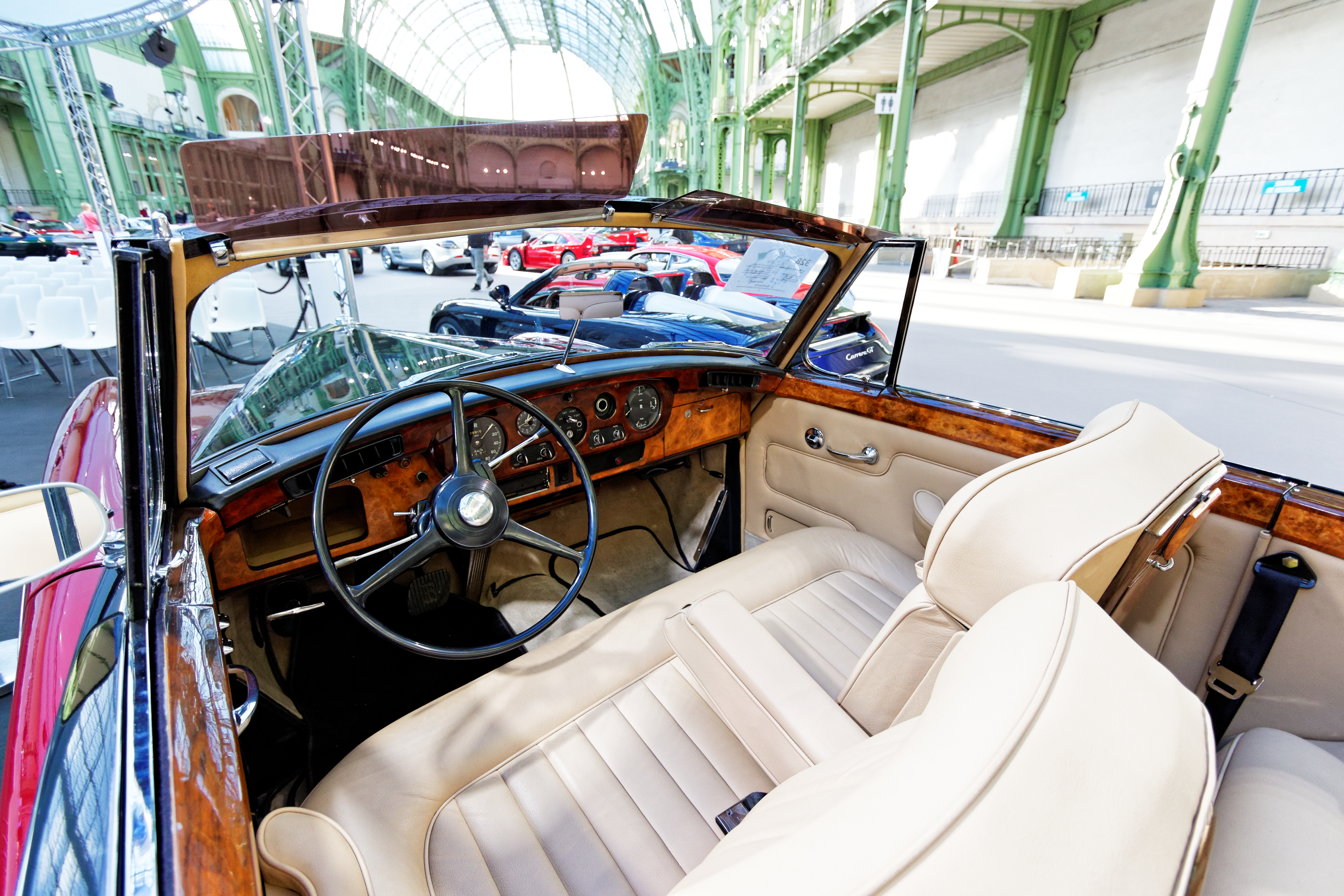
1964 Silver Cloud III cabriolet interior

== Production ==
- Silver Cloud: 2,238
- Silver Cloud Long Wheelbase: 85
- Silver Cloud special coachbuilder styles (convertibles, coupes etc.): 121
- Silver Cloud II: 2,417
- Silver Cloud II Long Wheelbase: 258
- Silver Cloud II coachbuilder styles (convertibles, coupes etc.): 107
- Silver Cloud III: 2,044
- Silver Cloud III Long Wheelbase: 206
- Silver Cloud III coachbuilder styles (convertibles, coupes etc.): 328

== Popular culture ==
A silver 1962 Silver Cloud II appeared prominently in every episode of Aaron Spelling's Burke's Law (1963 TV series) and Burke's Law (1994 TV series), as the personal transport of millionaire detective Amos Burke. The unusual car, for a working police detective, featured in many show storylines, which included efforts by Burke to seduce females tangential to the weekly murder.

A black 1965 Silver Cloud III 'Chinese eye' Mulliner Park Ward drophead coupé previously owned by Jimmy Savile was prominently featured in the 1966 Michelangelo Antonioni film Blowup.

A silver 1963 Rolls-Royce Silver Cloud III 'Chinese eye' Mulliner Park Ward Fixed Head Coupé appeared frequently in the 1975 film Shampoo.

A white 1965 Silver Cloud III featured prominently in The Avengers episode "Mission: Highly Improbable" broadcast November 1967.

A black Silver Cloud III was given away as the grand prize in a sweepstakes in the 1985's The Wrestling Classic.

Donald Trump owns a 1956 Silver Cloud
