= Rolls-Royce V8 engine =

Rolls-Royce Motors produced two distinct series of V8 engine, and did advanced design of a third. The first powered the 1905 "V-8" model and was made in very small numbers. The second was developed in the 1950s and was known internally as the "L Series". The L Series, in highly developed form, continued to power some models of Bentley automobiles until 2020. The N Series was a design project that developed an advanced four-valve overhead cam V8 that failed to go into production.

== 1905 V-8 ==
Three 1905 Rolls-Royce V-8 automobiles were manufactured using the company’s first V-8 engine design but only one example was sold, a car using the two seat "Legalimit" body. This proved unreliable and was later taken back by the factory and scrapped. The other two were used for factory transport or display purposes. Rolls ordered three more chassis for delivery in 1906 but there is no evidence these were ever made. No example of a 1905 V-8 car or engine is known to survive.

Although the 1905 V-8 cannot be judged a success, lessons learned from the engine were used in subsequent Rolls-Royce engine designs.

== L Series V8 ==
Having used straight six, straight eight and V-12 engines in the interim period, the need for another new engine was recognised in the early 1950s. Development of a totally new V8 engine began in 1952, bearing no relation to the 1905 version apart from its V8 configuration. Rolls-Royce purchased Bentley in 1931 and the new engine was intended for use in both Rolls-Royce and Bentley automobiles. The result was a series of V8 engines known internally as the "L410", the name relating to its bore size of 4.10 inches, in accordance with the company practice.

Despite some attempts at changing the naming convention, the engine has kept both the 4.10 inch bore and the name L410 throughout its life, with the exception of the odd prototype. Continuous improvement saw the L410I, denoting fuel injection, the L410IT (for Injection Turbo) and the L410ITI (for Injection Turbo Intercooler). 94MY (model year) saw the introduction of a serpentine drive belt front-end, revised combustion system and an integrated engine cover. Developments of the L410 continued in production to power Rolls-Royces and Bentleys until the adoption of BMW V12 power by Rolls-Royce in the Silver Seraph and, subsequently, after BMW was granted a license to use the Rolls-Royce brand (for automobiles) in the Goodwood-produced Phantom.

The L410 engine was still used by Bentley until 2020, latterly in the Bentley Mulsanne, having been brought back into production by Volkswagen Group due to customer demand, and also as a means to negate the requirement to purchase engines from BMW for the Bentley Arnage model. Renamed the L675, it remained under continuous development, although it was superseded by a 6.0L W12 Volkswagen engine in other models. The Bentley brand and all former Rolls-Royce and Bentley automotive manufacturing assets have been owned by Volkswagen AG since 1998.

== N Series V8 ==
Around 1987, the requirement for a more modern, downsized V8 engine was identified. Engine designers Derek Jackson and Geoff Attwood performed the majority of work under Les Maddock and Colin Weston, the first result of which was the N80, a 4-valve, double overhead camshaft, 5.0 litre V8. This successfully ran first stage 1000 hours testing straight off the drawing board without incident. Subsequently, the marketing brief foresaw the requirement for a higher capacity version and the N81, 6.0 litre version, was designed. The project was stopped around 1991 with further development of the L410 engine that enabled emissions requirements to be met using a pre-catalyst assembly at substantially lower investment.
