= Rolls-Royce SZ =

Rolls-Royce SZ and Bentley SZ are the platform of several Rolls-Royce and Bentley automobile models produced from 1980 to 2003.

The SZ series succeeded the SY series, the basis for the Rolls-Royce Silver Shadow and Silver Wraith, and Bentley T-series, produced from 1965 to 1980, as well as the Rolls-Royce Corniche, produced from 1966–1995.

The "SZ" was originally an internal code name at Rolls-Royce Motors. All SZ cars have the letter Z at the fourth position in the Vehicle Identification Number (VIN) and are powered by the Rolls-Royce – Bentley L Series V8 engine. The SZ was introduced to the media in Nice ahead of its official Geneva Motor Show debut.

== Rolls-Royce SZ models ==
- Rolls-Royce Silver Spirit
- Rolls-Royce Silver Spirit II
- Rolls-Royce Silver Spirit III
- Rolls-Royce New Silver Spirit (mark IV)
- Rolls-Royce Silver Spur
- Rolls-Royce Silver Spur II
- Rolls-Royce Silver Spur III
- Rolls-Royce New Silver Spur (mark IV)
- Rolls-Royce Silver Dawn
- Rolls-Royce Flying Spur
- Rolls-Royce Touring Limousine
- Rolls-Royce Park Ward Limousine
- Rolls-Royce Corniche (from 1982)
- Rolls-Royce Corniche II
- Rolls-Royce Corniche III
- Rolls-Royce Corniche IV
- Rolls-Royce Corniche V (2000)

== Bentley SZ models ==
- Bentley Mulsanne
- Bentley Mulsanne Turbo
- Bentley Eight
- Bentley Turbo R
- Bentley Turbo RT
- Bentley Mulsanne S
- Bentley Continental R
- Bentley Brooklands
- Bentley Azure (mark I)
- Bentley Continental T
- Bentley Touring Limousine
- Bentley Corniche (1982-1998)
