= Sedanca =

Sedanca may refer to:

- Coupe de Ville: A "Sedanca de Ville" — also known as "Coupe de Ville" or "Town Car" — is an automobile with an external or open-topped driver's position and an enclosed compartment for passengers.
- Bentley Continental SC 'Sedanca Coupé', a limited-edition version of the Bentley Continental T produced in 1999.
