= Bentley Grand Convertible =

Overview
- Manufacturer: Bentley Motors

Body and chassis
- Body style: 2-door 2+2 convertible
- Layout: Front-engine, rear-wheel-drive

Powertrain
- Engine: 6.75 L twin-turbocharged Rolls-Royce–Bentley L-series V8 engine

The Bentley Grand Convertible is a four-seat, luxury convertible concept car from Bentley Motors. The car debuted at the 2014 LA Auto Show.

Like its predecessor, the Azure, the Grand Convertible rides on the platform of Bentley's current luxury saloon, the Mulsanne. It uses the Mulsanne Speed's 6 3/4 liter turbo V8, putting out 530 hp (395 kW) and 811 lb⋅ft (1,100 N⋅m) of torque.

The interior is finished in leather with Mulliner's signature diamond quilting. The convertible top's tonneau cover is covered with largest wood veneer ever applied to a Bentley, in book matched Burr Walnut wood. The tonneau was finished entirely by hand with the wood's mirror finish being accented by strips of chromed steel.

The concept car's exterior finish is a bespoke blue color created from "a single squib from a customer's haute couture gown." The unique finish continues with silver "liquid metal" finish on the hood and windscreen frame. Additional unique features include custom directional wheels and a linen colored leather interior with Sequin Blue stitching.

In 2012, Bentley had shown drawings of a convertible version of the Mulsanne to a small number of customers during an event at Pebble Beach. No photos were allowed to be taken and no official images were released. Then CEO Wolfgang Shreiber cancelled the project. Current CEO, Wolfgang Dürheimer restarted the project, but the Grand Convertible still has not been approved for production. At the 2014 L.A. Auto Show, Dürheimer said, "We are eagerly awaiting the response of our customers to this car. We will ensure that this car - if it reaches the roads – will be a highly exclusive, extremely limited collector’s piece."

In December 2014, the Grand Convertible was displayed in Miami for Art Basel, where Bentley had commissioned a large art display which simulated a car factory. As of November, 2017, it was announced that the Bentley Grand Convertible would be produced in very limited numbers at a cost of 3.9 million dollars each. The car will only be sold in Europe, the Middle East, and Russia. None will be imported into rest of the world (include the Americas, and Asia-Pacific regions).
