= Bentley Brooklands Coupé =

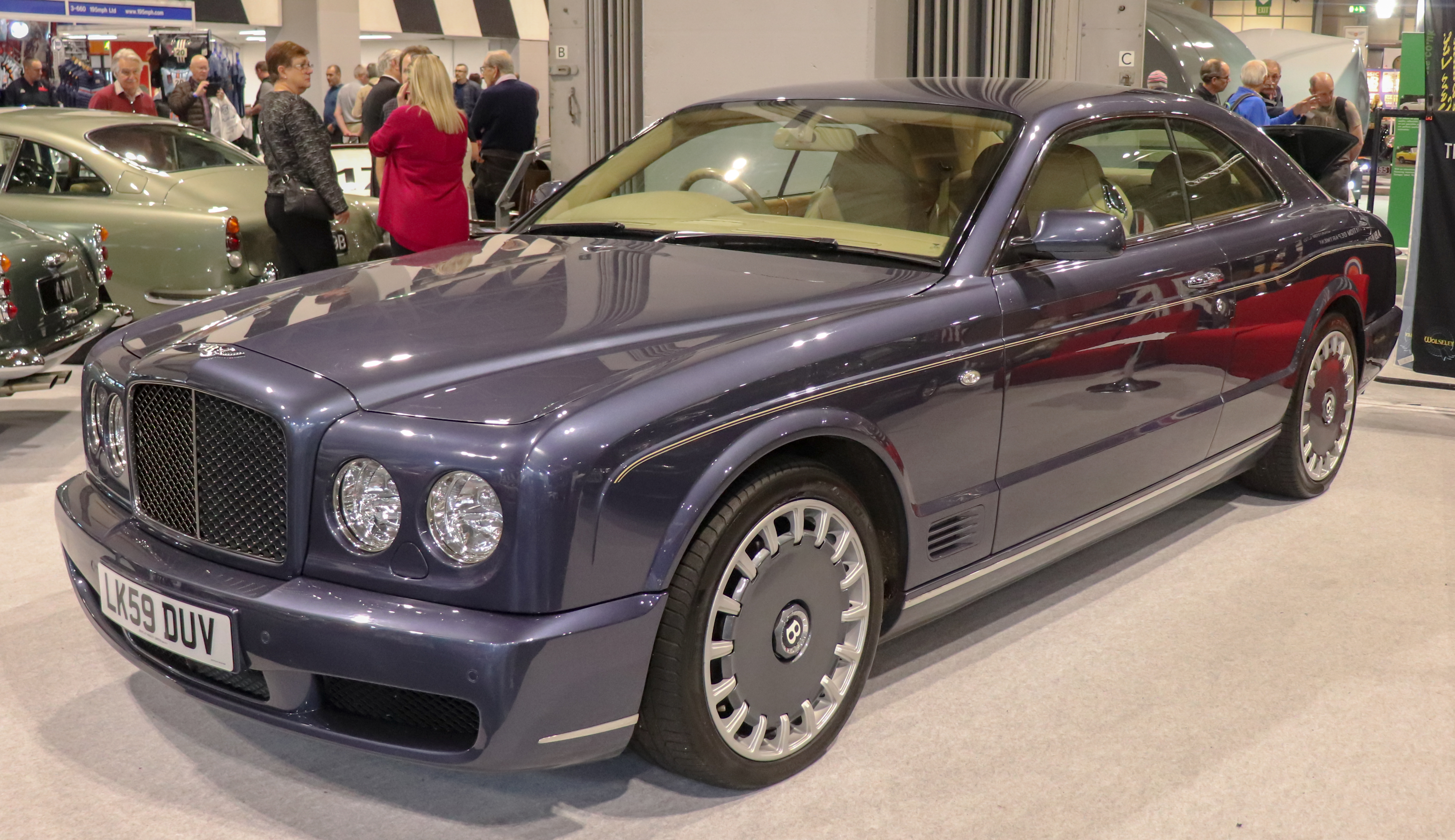
- 2009 Bentley Brooklands Coupé

Overview
- Manufacturer: Bentley Motors
- Production: 2008–2011 max. 550 units
- Assembly: United Kingdom: Crewe (Bentley Crewe)
- Designer: Raul Pires

Body and chassis
- Class: Grand tourer (S)
- Body style: 2-door hardtop coupé
- Related: Bentley Arnage; Bentley Azure

Powertrain
- Engine: 6.75 L twin-turbo Bentley V8
- Transmission: 6-speed ZF 6HP-32 automatic

Dimensions
- Wheelbase: 3,116 mm (122.7 in)
- Length: 5,411 mm (213.0 in)
- Width: 1,900 mm (74.8 in) (w/mirrors: 2,125 mm (83.7 in))
- Height: 1,473 mm (58.0 in)
- Kerb weight: 2,650.5 kg (5,843 lb)

Chronology
- Predecessor: Bentley Continental R; Bentley Continental T

The Bentley Brooklands Coupé is a two-door hardtop coupé version of the Bentley Azure convertible (itself related to the Bentley Arnage). As a hand-assembled car made in very small numbers, employing traditional coach-building techniques and craftsmanship skills in wood and leather, the Brooklands Coupé is the true successor to the discontinued Bentley Continental R and T. Lifetime production was limited 550 cars, and deliveries started in the first half of 2008, with the car being discontinued three years later.

The Brooklands is powered by a 6.75-litre Rolls-Royce twin-turbocharged OHV V8 engine, producing 530 hp (395 kW) and 1,050 N⋅m (774 lbf⋅ft), the highest torque ever developed by a production V8 engine using petrol at the time (there were diesel V8s producing more). It was featured on Top Gear in series 11 by Jeremy Clarkson, and due to the car having so much torque, one of the car's tires blew out during a powerslide after prolonged aggressive driving with its traction control off. It can accelerate from 0 to 60 mph (0 to 97 km/h) in around 5.0 seconds, with a top speed in the region of 296 km/h (183.9 mph). The Brooklands offered an optional Carbon fibre-reinforced Silicon Carbide (C/SiC) ceramic composite braking system with 14-inch SGL Carbon brake discs (only with 20-inch wheels). The Brooklands features a pillarless design, with no B pillar between the front and rear side windows.

When retired in 2011, it marked the end of the last Rolls-Royce Crewe platform, concluding the history of the old Rolls-Royce.

Specifications:

- maximum rated motive power: 530 hp (395 kW; 537 PS) at 4,000 rpm
- maximum torque: 1,050 N⋅m (774 lbf⋅ft) at 3,250 rpm
- 0 to 60 mph (0 to 97 km/h): 5.0 seconds
- 0 to 100 km/h (0 to 62 mph): 5.3 seconds
- Top speed: 296 km/h (183.9 mph)
- 0 to 100 mph (0 to 161 km/h): 11.7 seconds

== Gallery ==
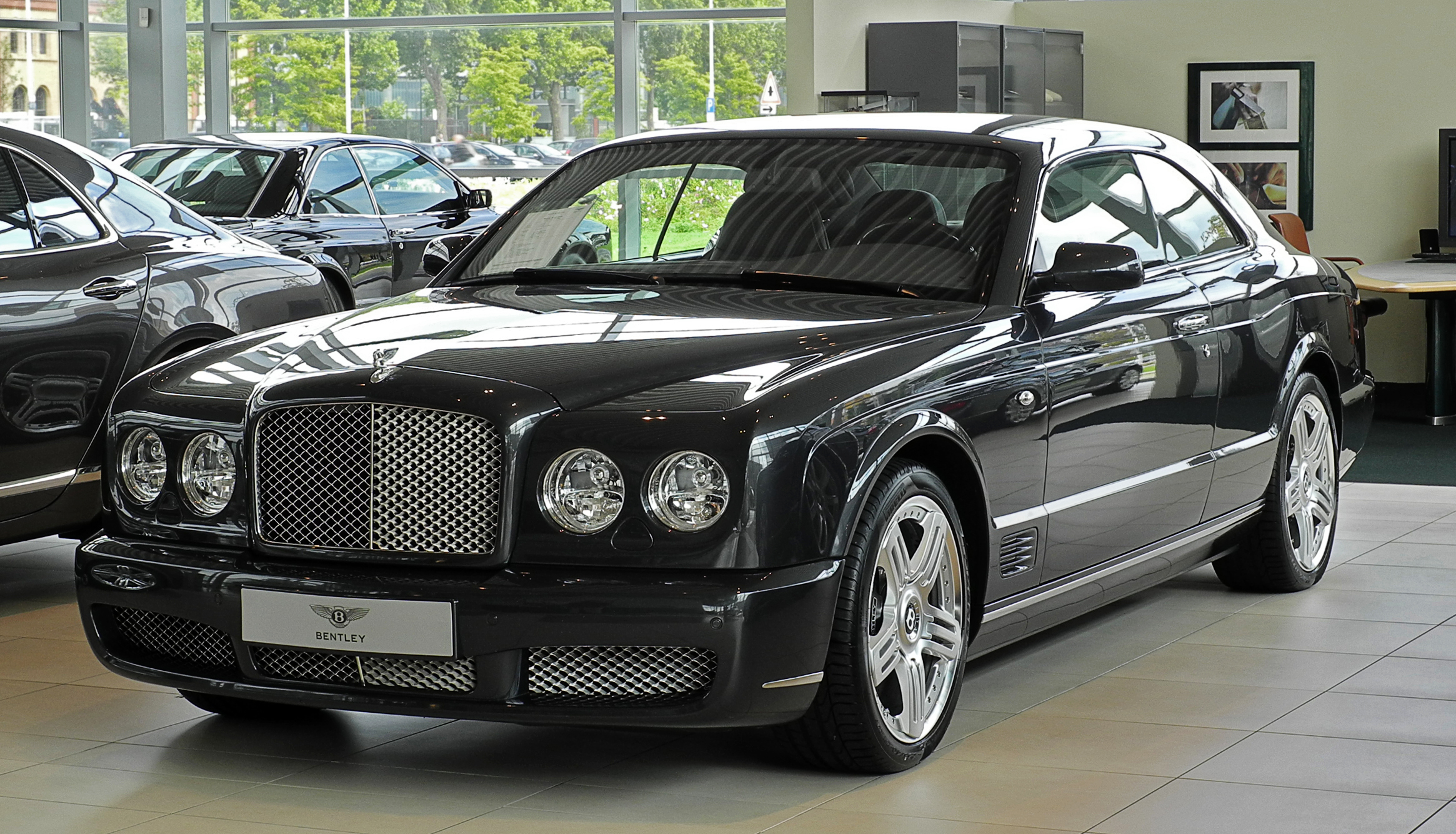
Front view

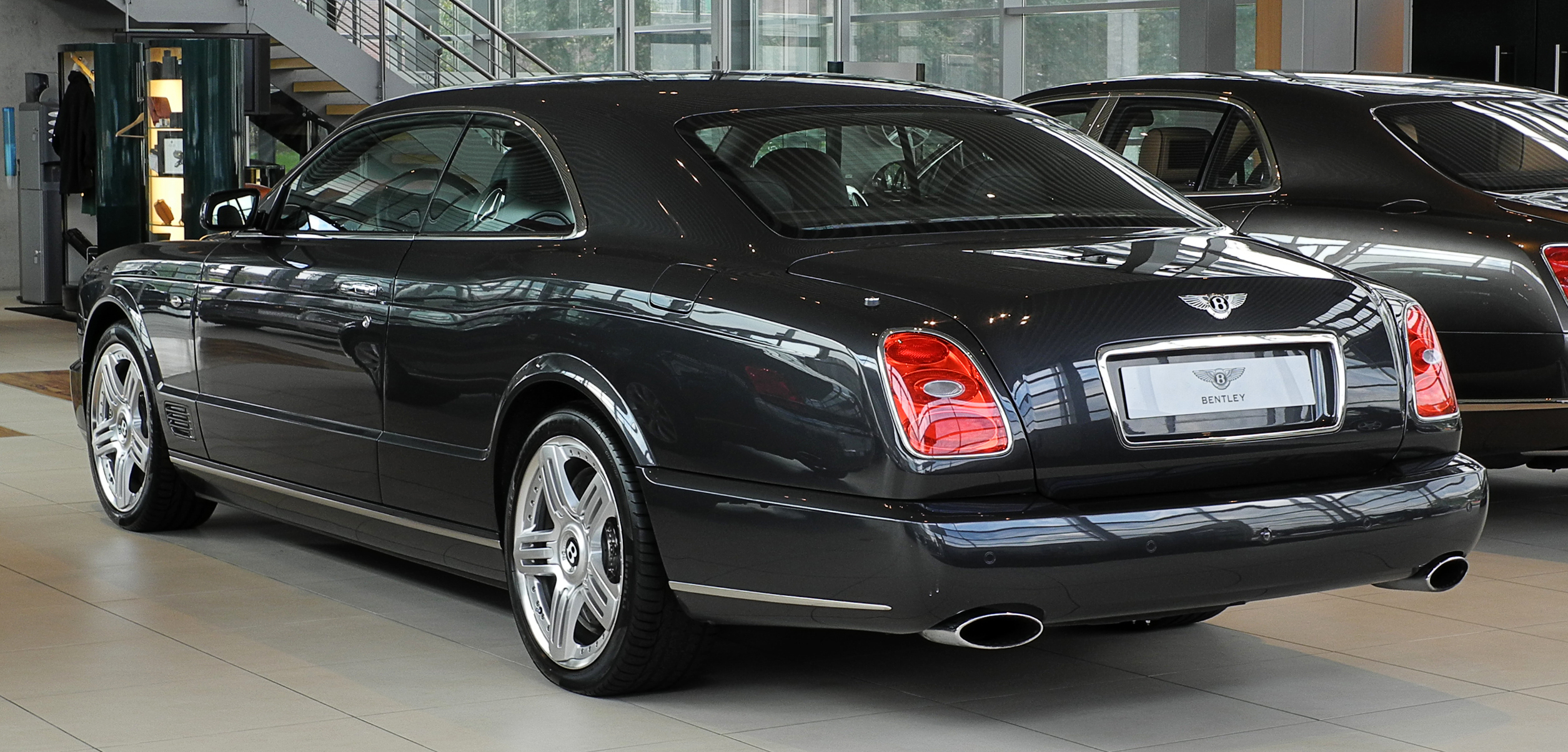
Rear view
