= Rolls-Royce Motors =

Former British car company (1973–1998)

- The Rolls-Royce Motors emblem
- Company type: Private
- Industry: Automotive
- Founded: 1973; 53 years ago
- Defunct: 1998; 28 years ago
- Fate: Sold to Volkswagen Group
- Successor: Rolls-Royce Motor Cars Limited; Bentley Motors Limited
- Headquarters: United Kingdom
- Products: Automobiles
- Owner: Vickers plc

Rolls-Royce Motors was a British luxury car manufacturer, created in 1973 during the de-merger of the Rolls-Royce automotive business from the nationalised Rolls-Royce Limited. It produced luxury cars under the Rolls-Royce and Bentley brands. Vickers acquired the company in 1980 and sold it to Volkswagen in 1998. Bentley Motors is the company's direct successor, but BMW acquired the rights to the Rolls-Royce trademark for use on automobiles and launched a new company, Rolls-Royce Motor Cars, in 2003.

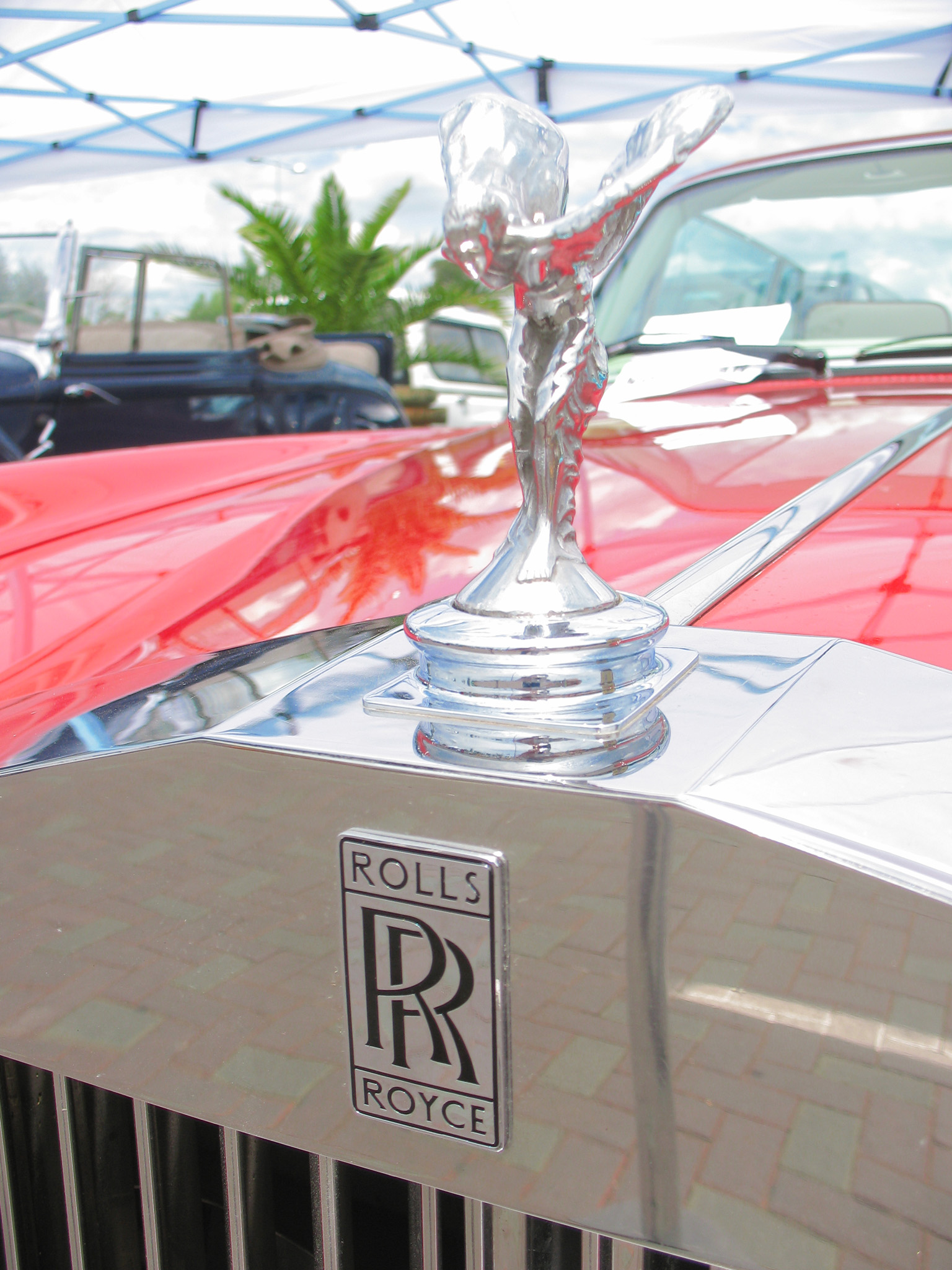
Rolls-Royce logo and the Spirit of Ecstasy equipped on a Rolls-Royce Corniche III

== History ==
Logo for the company used c. 1980

The original Rolls-Royce Limited had been nationalised in 1971 due to the financial collapse of the company, caused in part by the development of the RB211 jet engine. In 1973, the British government sold the Rolls-Royce car business to allow nationalised parent Rolls-Royce (1971) Limited to concentrate on jet engine manufacture.

In 1980, Rolls-Royce Motors was acquired by Vickers.

A marketing survey in 1987 showed that only Coca-Cola was a more widely known brand than Rolls-Royce.

=== Sale to Volkswagen ===
In 1998, Vickers plc decided to sell Rolls-Royce Motors. The leading contender seemed to be BMW, who already supplied internal combustion engines and other components for Rolls-Royce and Bentley cars. Their final offer of £340m was outbid by Volkswagen Group, who offered £430m.

As part of the deal, Volkswagen Group acquired the Crewe factory, plus the rights to the "Spirit of Ecstasy" mascot and the shape of the radiator grille. However, the Rolls-Royce brand name and logo were controlled by aero-engine maker Rolls-Royce plc, and not Rolls-Royce Motors. The aero-engine maker decided to license the Rolls-Royce name and logo to BMW and not to Volkswagen, largely because the aero-engine maker had recently shared joint business ventures with BMW. BMW paid £40m to license the Rolls-Royce name and "RR" logo. Volkswagen Group had the rights to the mascot and grille, but lacked rights to the Rolls-Royce name in order to build the cars; likewise, BMW had the name, but lacked rights to the grille and mascot.

The situation was tilted in BMW's favour, as they could withdraw their engine supply with just 12 months notice, which was insufficient time for VW to re-engineer the Rolls-Royce cars to use VW's own engines. Volkswagen claimed that it only really wanted Bentley anyway, as it was the higher volume brand, with Bentley models out-selling the equivalent Rolls-Royce by around two to one.

=== Loss of Rolls-Royce marque ===
After negotiations, BMW and Volkswagen Group arrived at a solution. From 1998 to 2002, BMW would continue to supply engines for the cars and would allow Volkswagen use of the Rolls-Royce name and logo. On 1 January 2003, only BMW would be able to name cars "Rolls-Royce", and Volkswagen Group's former Rolls-Royce/Bentley division would build only cars called "Bentley". The last Rolls-Royce from the Crewe factory, the Corniche, ceased production in 2002, at which time the Crewe factory became Bentley Motors Limited, and Rolls-Royce production was relocated to a new entity in Goodwood, England known as Rolls-Royce Motor Cars.

Despite losing control of the Rolls-Royce marque to BMW, the former Rolls-Royce/Bentley subsidiary retains many historical Rolls-Royce car assets such as the Crewe factory and L Series V8 engine.

=== Leadership ===
- 1971–1980 Sir David Plastow
- 1980–1986 George Fenn
- 1986–1994 Peter Ward
- 1994–1998 Chris Woodwark
- 1998 Graham Morris

== Cars ==
- 1965–1980 Silver Shadow—the first Rolls-Royce with a monocoque chassis; started with a 6.23 L V8 engine, later expanded to 6.75 L; shared its design with the Bentley T-series
- 1968–1991 Phantom VI
- 1971–1996 Corniche I-IV
- 1975–1986 Camargue styled by Paolo Martin with a Pininfarina body
- 1980–1998 Silver Spirit/Silver Spur—design shared with the Bentley Mulsanne

Bentley models were produced mostly in parallel with the above cars. The Bentley Continental coupés (produced in various forms from the mid-1950s to the mid-1960s) did not have Rolls-Royce equivalents. Very expensive Rolls-Royce Phantom limousines were also produced.

=== Volkswagen Group era ===
- 1998–2002 Silver Seraph—This shared its design with the Bentley Arnage, which sold in much greater numbers.
- 2000–02 Corniche V—This two-door convertible shared its design with the Bentley Azure and was the most expensive Rolls-Royce until the introduction of the 2003 Phantom.

== See also ==
- Bentley
- Rolls-Royce Limited
- Luxury vehicle
- List of car manufacturers of the United Kingdom
