= Rolls-Royce–Bentley L-series V8 engine =

Automotive engine

Rolls-Royce–Bentley L-series
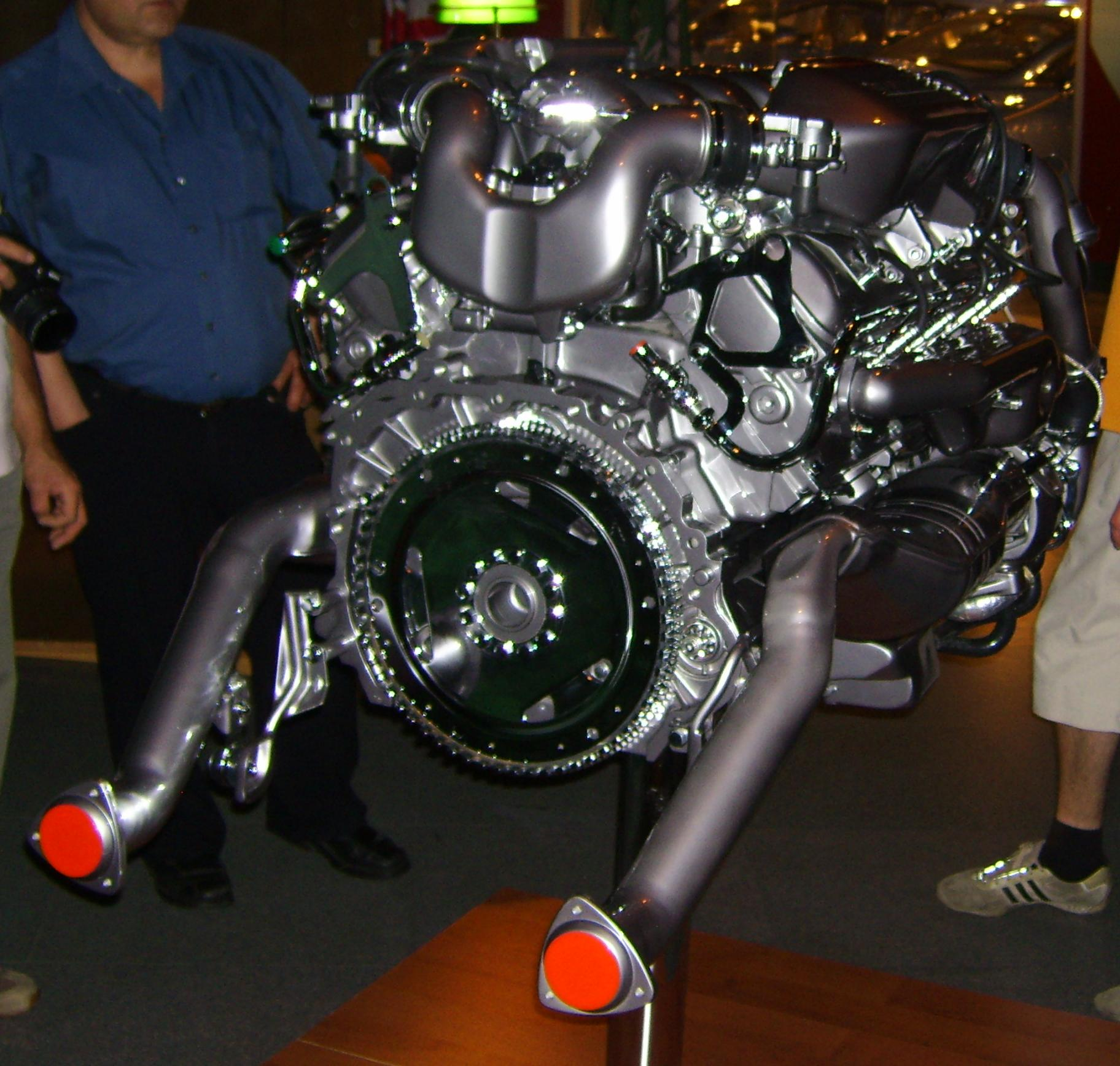
- 6.75-litre L-series from a modern Bentley

Overview
- Manufacturer: Rolls-Royce-Bentley
- Production: 1959–2020

Layout
- Configuration: 90° V8
- Displacement: 6,230 cc (380 cu in); 6,750 cc (412 cu in)
- Cylinder bore: 4.1 in (104.14 mm)
- Piston stroke: 3.6 in (91.44 mm); 3.9 in (99.06 mm)
- Valvetrain: OHV 2 valves x cyl.

Combustion
- Turbocharger: MHI twin-turbos with intercooler (later versions)
- Fuel system: Carburettor, Fuel injection
- Fuel type: Petrol
- Cooling system: Water-cooled

Output
- Power output: 172–530 bhp (128–395 kW)
- Torque output: 400–1,100 N⋅m (295–811 lb⋅ft)

The Rolls-Royce–Bentley L-series V8 engine is an engine introduced in 1959 and produced through 2020. Built in Crewe, it was used on most Rolls-Royce and Bentley automobiles in the four decades after its introduction, with its final application being the Bentley Mulsanne.

With BMW's acquisition of the rights to use the Rolls-Royce name in 1998, Rolls-Royce Motor Cars began using BMW supplied V12 engines but Bentley under Volkswagen Group (VAG) ownership continued to use highly modified versions of the L series on its Arnage, Azure, Brooklands and Mulsanne models, with VAG W-12 and V8 engines being used in its Continental GT, Flying Spur and Bentayga models.

== History ==
The first engine of V8 configuration was developed in 1904 by Léon Levavasseur in France and used for speedboat racing. Rolls-Royce premiered the world's first automobile production V8 engine in 1905 for the Rolls-Royce V-8 Legalimit – governed not to exceed the legal speed limit in Britain at the time of 20 mph (32 km/h). It was not a success, with only three made and just one sold, which was soon returned to the factory to be scrapped. It was another decade before Cadillac pioneered a mass production V8-engined automobile.

Rolls-Royce acquired Bentley in 1931 and continued to use Bentley engines alongside their own for a time, although none was a V8. Prior to World War II, Rolls-Royce had developed a 7.3-litre V-12 for the Phantom III, which was succeeded by the inlet-over-exhaust B60 straight-6 and B80 straight-8 series of engines. The B80 powered the Phantom IV limousine, whilst the 4.3-litre B60 was used until 1955 to power the Rolls-Royce Silver Wraith and Silver Dawn and the Bentley Mark VI. The B60's bore was enlarged in 1955, increasing the displacement to 4.9 litres, that engine being known as the B61.

The need for a new engine was recognised by Rolls-Royce in the early 1950s and its development began in 1952, bearing no relation to the 1905 Rolls-Royce V8. The result was a series of V8 engines known as the L series, more specifically the "L410" for its bore size of 4.1 in (104.14 mm), in keeping with company practice.

Developments of the L410 continued in production powering Rolls-Royces up to 1998 and Bentleys into the 21st century. Bentley, under Volkswagen ownership since 1998, continues to develop the L410 for its range of cars. Rolls-Royce ceased using the L410 with the switch to BMW ownership of that brand in March 1998 and introduction of a BMW sourced V12 engine in the Rolls-Royce Silver Seraph.

Since 1998 therefore, development and use of the L410 engine can be said to have been exclusively a Bentley enterprise.

== L-series engine nomenclature ==
The factory nomenclature for the L-series V8 engines, in chronological order, is as follows:

- L380 1950s 5,204 cc (317.6 cu in) initial development version
- L410 1959 6,230 cc (380 cu in) production version powering Silver Cloud II, Phantom, and S2 series
- L425 1965 7,439 cc (454.0 cu in) experimental version
- L410B 1965 6,230 cc (380 cu in) updated production version powering Silver Shadow and T series
- L410 1970 6,750 cc (412 cu in) production version, capacity increase achieved by 'stroking' to 3.9-inch (99.06 mm)
- L410E 1970s 7,269 cc (443.6 cu in) development version with 4.2-inch (106.7 mm) stroke
- L380 1970s 5,352 cc (326.6 cu in) "Thermodynamically Optimised Porsche (TOP)" experimental version
- L410D 1982 6,750 cc (412 cu in) turbocharged production version installed in Bentley Mulsanne
- L410I 1986 6,750 cc (412 cu in) fuel injected version
- L410IT 1987 6,750 cc (412 cu in) fuel injected production version in Bentley Mulsanne Turbo
- L410ITI 1991 6,750 cc (412 cu in) fuel injected, turbo, intercooled production version of Bentley Turbo R & S and Continental R & S
- L410MT 1997 6,750 cc (412 cu in) low pressure turbo
- L410MT/S 1997 6,750 cc (412 cu in) turbo
- L675 1998 6,750 cc (412 cu in) development name for Arnage version of the turbo, later reverted to "L410"
- L410TT 2007 6,750 cc (412 cu in) production version introducing twin MHI turbochargers with intercooler
- L410HT 2009 6,750 cc (412 cu in) variable cam phasing "high-torque" production version for 2009 Mulsanne

=== Marine engine ===
- LM 841 c1963-4 6,230 cc (380 cu in) 240 bhp (179 kW) marinised version of the engine available with port or starboard crank rotations

== Main engine capacities ==
=== 6.25-litre ===
The engine was of an overhead valve (OHV) design, angled at 90 degrees, and featured a central camshaft and wedge-shaped combustion chambers. As initially released, the bore x stroke was 4.1 in × 3.6 in (104.14 mm × 91.44 mm) and displaced 6,230 cc (380 cu in), which is rounded up to describe it as the six and a quarter litre engine.

When new, the Rolls-Royce/Bentley V8 was rumoured to be an American engine design licence-built, but it was developed in-house by Rolls-Royce and Bentley engineers. This can be seen in its design characteristics, with features like an aluminium alloy cylinder block with wet liners, gear-driven camshaft, (initially) outboard spark plugs and porting inspired by the Rolls-Royce Merlin aircraft engine. The bore spacing of 4 3/4 in (120.7 mm) was unlike any American V8 engine, with the sole exceptions of Buick's big block V-8 and AMC American Motor's V-8 line which share the same identical 4.750 bore centers, and the firing order was 1-5-4-8-6-3-7-2 something uncommon in any period American OHV V8. The deep skirted crankcase design is also less common with American V8 engines. Rolls-Royce however did use General Motors transmissions in their vehicles, notably the Hydramatic in Silver Cloud and the Turbo-Hydramatic in the Silver Shadow.

The marine version of the engine (LM 841) was sold directly as a "complete power pack". It was rated as being able to produce 220 bhp (164 kW) at 4000 rpm continuously for 12 hours, with peak power of 240 bhp (179 kW) at 4200 rpm. It was available with either direction of crankshaft rotation to suit port or starboard propellers. Engine cooling was closed loop glycol with heat exchangers to pumped sea water. It was supplied complete with a BorgWarner "velvet drive" gearbox.

==== Models ====
- Rolls-Royce Silver Cloud II and III (1959–1966)
- Rolls-Royce Phantom V (1959–1968)
- Bentley S2 (1959–1962)
- Bentley S3 (1962–1965)
- Rolls-Royce Silver Shadow (1965–1970)
- Bentley T-series (1965–1980)
- Rolls-Royce Phantom VI (1968–1982)

==== Production ====
- Rolls-Royce Limited (1959–1973)
  - Bentley, subsidiary thereof
- Rolls-Royce Motors (1973–1982), subsidiary of Vickers plc (from 1980)
  - Bentley, subsidiary thereof

=== 6.75-Litre ===
Starting in 1970 for the 1971 model year, the stroke of the V8 engine was increased from 3.6 to 3.9 in (91.44 to 99.06 mm), thereby increasing the engine capacity to 6,750 cc (412 cu in). Known as the Six and Three-Quarter Litre or simply the Six and Three-Quarter, it is the most widely produced and well known of all the versions.

The power output of the 6.75-litre over the 6.25-litre version was not very significant at the outset, the emphasis having been on increased torque. The plethora of revisions introduced throughout the engine's life were primarily to comply with ever-increasing legislative emissions requirements and many of these would indeed reduce power output; by 1994, turbocharging had been brought in across the entire Rolls-Royce and Bentley range, to finally overcome this problem. However, two of the most notable early changes were, first, Bosch fuel injection, offered as an option in the American market in 1986, then standard from early 1987 with a revised firing order. With 232bhp @ 4320 and 336 lb-ft of torque, this is the most powerful normally aspirated production version of the engine ever made; by 1989, the output had dropped to 220 bhp and 325 lb-ft of torque. However, the firing order produced an idling characteristic that Rolls-Royce owners disliked; these rare cars can be identified from the driver's seat by their 'gentle rocking' tick-over. As a result, second, the previous carburetor-equipped engine's firing order of 1-5-4-8-6-3-7-2 was quickly re-introduced later that same year, 1987, to produce the smoothness the fuel injected engine is now famous for. With electronic engine management, improved tuning and the addition of turbochargers, the 6.75-litre became one of the world's most powerful automobile engines and enormously enhanced the image of Bentley as a sporting car maker.

The process of evolving the engine was gradual and continuous; by 2006 almost all the 1959-specification engine components had been upgraded, so that the 2020 twin-turbo 6.75-litre engine produced over 150% more motive power and torque than at the beginning of its life, had 40% better fuel economy, and produced 99.5% less exhaust emission. In the Brooklands and Mulsanne, the 6.75-litre engine produced 395 kW (537 PS; 530 bhp) and 1,050 N⋅m (774 lb⋅ft) of torque.

The 6 3/4 litres (412 cu in) 512 PS (377 kW; 505 bhp) engine used in Bentley Mulsanne was built at Crewe plant, and took nearly 30 hours to build.

The twin-turbo V8 engine was cast at Bridgnorth, Shropshire, England and fully machined and partially assembled at the company's machining facility in Telford, Shropshire, England.

The Rolls-Royce/Bentley V8 is the engine with the longest production run in history, surpassing the Chevrolet Small-block V8. As the Chevrolet small-block engine is now only available as a crate engine and its successor the GM LS engine is dynamically unrelated to it, the Rolls-Royce/Bentley V8 could through 2020 have been considered to be the engine with the longest production run in history that was still fitted to a vehicle from factory.

==== Models ====
- Rolls-Royce Phantom VI (1968–1991)
- Rolls-Royce Silver Shadow (1970–1980)
- Bentley T-series (1970–1980)
- Rolls-Royce Corniche (1971–1996)
- Rolls-Royce Camargue (1975–1986)
- Rolls-Royce Silver Spirit (1980–1998)
- Rolls-Royce Silver Spur/Flying Spur (1980–1998)
- Bentley Mulsanne (1980–1992)
- Bentley Eight (1984–1992)
- Bentley Turbo R, Turbo S (1985–1997)
- Bentley Azure (1995–2003, 2006–2009)
- Bentley Continental R, Continental S (1991–2003)
- Bentley Brooklands (1992–1998)
- Bentley Turbo RT (1997–1998)
- Bentley Arnage (1998–2009)
- Rolls-Royce Corniche, Corniche S (2000) (2000–2002)
- Bentley Brooklands Coupé (2008–2011)
- Bentley Mulsanne (2010) (2010–2020)

==== Production ====
- Rolls-Royce Limited (1968–1973)
  - Bentley, subsidiary thereof
- Rolls-Royce Motors (1973–2002), subsidiary of Vickers plc (1980–1998)
  - Bentley, subsidiary thereof (until 1998)
- Bentley Motors Limited, subsidiary of Volkswagen Group (1998–2020)

== The marques' split ==
BMW began supplying Rolls-Royce and Bentley with engines in 1998, specifically a V12 engine for the Rolls-Royce Silver Seraph and a twin-turbo 4.4-litre V8 engine to replace the 6.75-litre for the Bentley Arnage. BMW V8 engines were used exclusively in the Arnage from 1998 to 2000.

Vickers plc placed the Rolls-Royce and Bentley car manufacturing business up for sale in 1997, shortly after the introduction of the new models, in order that they could focus on their core defence business. BMW were initially expected to agree to a purchase quickly given their existing engine and component supply contracts with Rolls-Royce and Bentley, together with their recent history of expansion in the UK, with the purchase of Rover Group. BMW would go on to warn Mayflower Corporation that it would cease to supply engines should they purchase Vickers or Rolls-Royce and Bentley, and that it considered itself the best buyer for the company in late 1997.

BMW would reach an agreement with Vickers to acquire Rolls-Royce and Bentley Motor Cars on 31 April 1998 for £340m, but this was superseded by an agreement for Volkswagen Group to acquire the business for £430m, which was announced eight days later, on 7 May 1998. The Volkswagen sale appeared to have collapsed later in May, with BMW being announced as the preferred buyer for the Rolls-Royce and Bentley business 1 June 1998, subject to shareholder approval. Such approval was not forthcoming and the BMW deal collapsed when Volkswagen subsidiary Audi agreed to buy Cosworth from Vickers for £120m only if Volkswagen Group's £430m bid for Rolls-Royce and Bentley was accepted.

Volkswagen's bid to purchase Rolls-Royce and Bentley Motors from Vickers was finally accepted, and a price of £479m was paid, but by the end of July 1998, it became apparent that they would be unable to market any vehicle under the Rolls-Royce brand or use the Rolls-Royce badge on any of their products, as they had not acquired the rights to the Rolls-Royce brand name or the Rolls-Royce badge, which were retained by the aero engine manufacturer Rolls-Royce plc following the 1973 divestment of the car manufacturing business, and Rolls-Royce plc were not prepared to allow Volkswagen to license this crucial intellectual property.

Three way negotiations between Volkswagen Group, BMW and Rolls-Royce plc resulted in BMW purchasing the rights to the Rolls-Royce brand and badge from Rolls-Royce plc for £40m. Rolls-Royce plc, who had been involved in an aero engine joint venture with BMW since 1990 consistently supported their long time business partner during the bidding process for Rolls-Royce and Bentley Motors.

German politicians brokered a deal between Volkswagen Group and BMW to ensure BMW would continue to supply engines, transmissions and key components for a five-year period, with BMW sub-licensing the necessary intellectual property to allow Volkswagen to build and sell the Rolls-Royce Silver Seraph. It was considered damaging to the German automotive industry for Volkswagen and BMW to engage in legal action against each other.

The deal reached allowed Volkswagen Group to retain use of the Rolls-Royce brand until the end of 2002, when Rolls-Royce Motors transferred to BMW control, leaving VW with the Bentley marque, the factory, and ownership of all current models (although production of the Rolls-Royce Silver Seraph was discontinued).

BMW no longer owns the rights to produce any pre-2003 Rolls-Royce or Bentley engines. The Rolls-Royce Phantom VII and its derivatives use a normally aspirated BMW V12 engine, which has no technical similarities with the L410 engine. The Rolls-Royce Ghost introduced in 2010 uses a 6.6-litre twin-turbo V12.

Under Volkswagen Group, the Bentley Arnage's BMW engine was phased out from 2000 to 2002 and the L410 engine was reintroduced in highly redeveloped form. The Arnage-derived Brooklands uses the most powerful version of the engine yet. Those models and the convertible Bentley Azure are produced alongside the Bentley Mulsanne and smaller Bentleys based on the Continental GT, which use the Volkswagen Group W-12 engine.
