= Rolls-Royce Corniche (2000) =

High-end luxury convertible

Rolls-Royce Corniche V
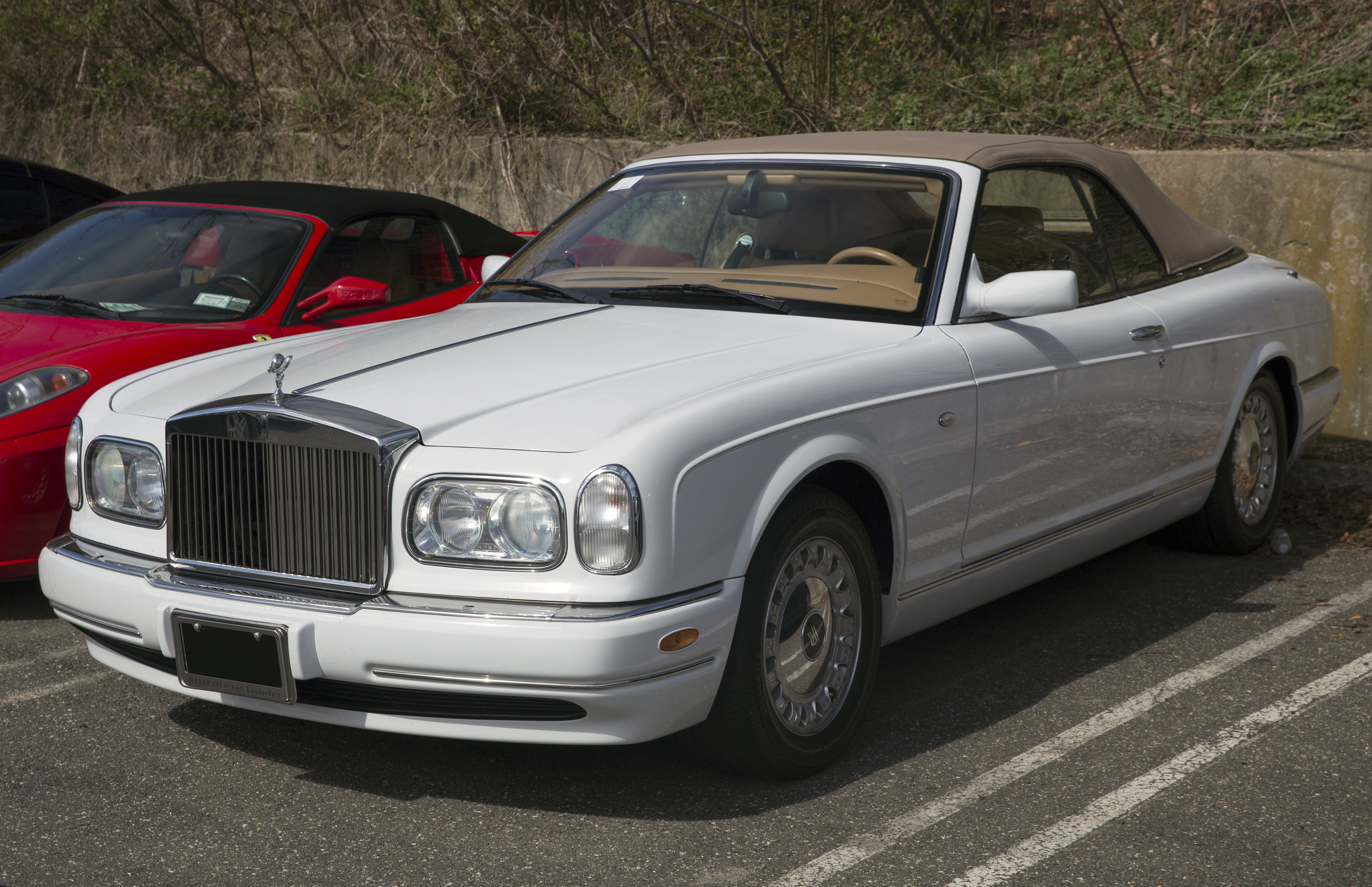
- 2000 Rolls-Royce Corniche V

Overview
- Manufacturer: Rolls-Royce Motors
- Production: 1999–2002; 384 produced
- Model years: 2000–2002
- Assembly: United Kingdom: Crewe, England
- Designer: Graham Hull

Body and chassis
- Class: Grand tourer (S)
- Body style: 2-door convertible
- Layout: FR layout
- Platform: Rolls-Royce SZ
- Related: Bentley Azure

Powertrain
- Engine: 6.75 L turbocharged Rolls-Royce V8
- Transmission: 4-speed 4L80-E automatic

Dimensions
- Wheelbase: 120.51 in (3,061 mm)
- Length: 212.79 in (5,405 mm)
- Width: 81.02 in (2,058 mm)
- Height: 58.07 in (1,475 mm)
- Kerb weight: 6,031 lb (2,736 kg)

Chronology
- Predecessor: Rolls-Royce Corniche IV
- Successor: Rolls-Royce Phantom Drophead Coupé (indirect)

The Rolls-Royce Corniche V is a high end, two-door, four-seater luxury convertible car, that was produced in the United Kingdom from 1999 until 2002.

The model debuted in January 2000 and it was the second new model generation to bear the Corniche name, after four consecutive Corniche series derived from the Rolls-Royce Silver Shadow. Contrary to all its predecessors, this Corniche was also the first Rolls-Royce with a soft-top that folded into the car's body.

Despite all-new sheetmetal, bearing a strong resemblance to the Silver Seraph, it had instead been derived from the pre-BMW era Bentley Azure, the model continued use of the traditional Rolls-Royce 6.75L V8 engine-block, in common with its predecessors, albeit significantly modernised, with improved performance, due to the Bentley-inherited turbocharger — this was the first Corniche to have this feature standard.

Released after a five-year production gap, the fifth series Corniche was Rolls-Royce's most expensive model and flagship car, with a base price of US$359,900. From 2003, Rolls-Royce motor car production was handed over to BMW, who did not prolong the production of any of the existing models.

The Corniche V was the only Rolls-Royce model launched under Volkswagen holding ownership; and the last Rolls-Royce Corniche to date, with just 384 units built.

== Overview ==
=== Performance ===
The Rolls-Royce Corniche V is powered by a 325 hp (240 kW) 6.75 L turbocharged Rolls-Royce V8. The engine is capable of producing 738 N·m (544 lb·ft) of torque between 2,100 and 2,300 rpm. The engine is mated to a four-speed automatic transmission. It has a top speed of 135 mph (220 km/h) and a 0-60 mph (97 km/h) acceleration time of 8 seconds. The convertible, weighing 6,031 lb (2,736 kg), was built more for comfort than for speed.

=== Features ===
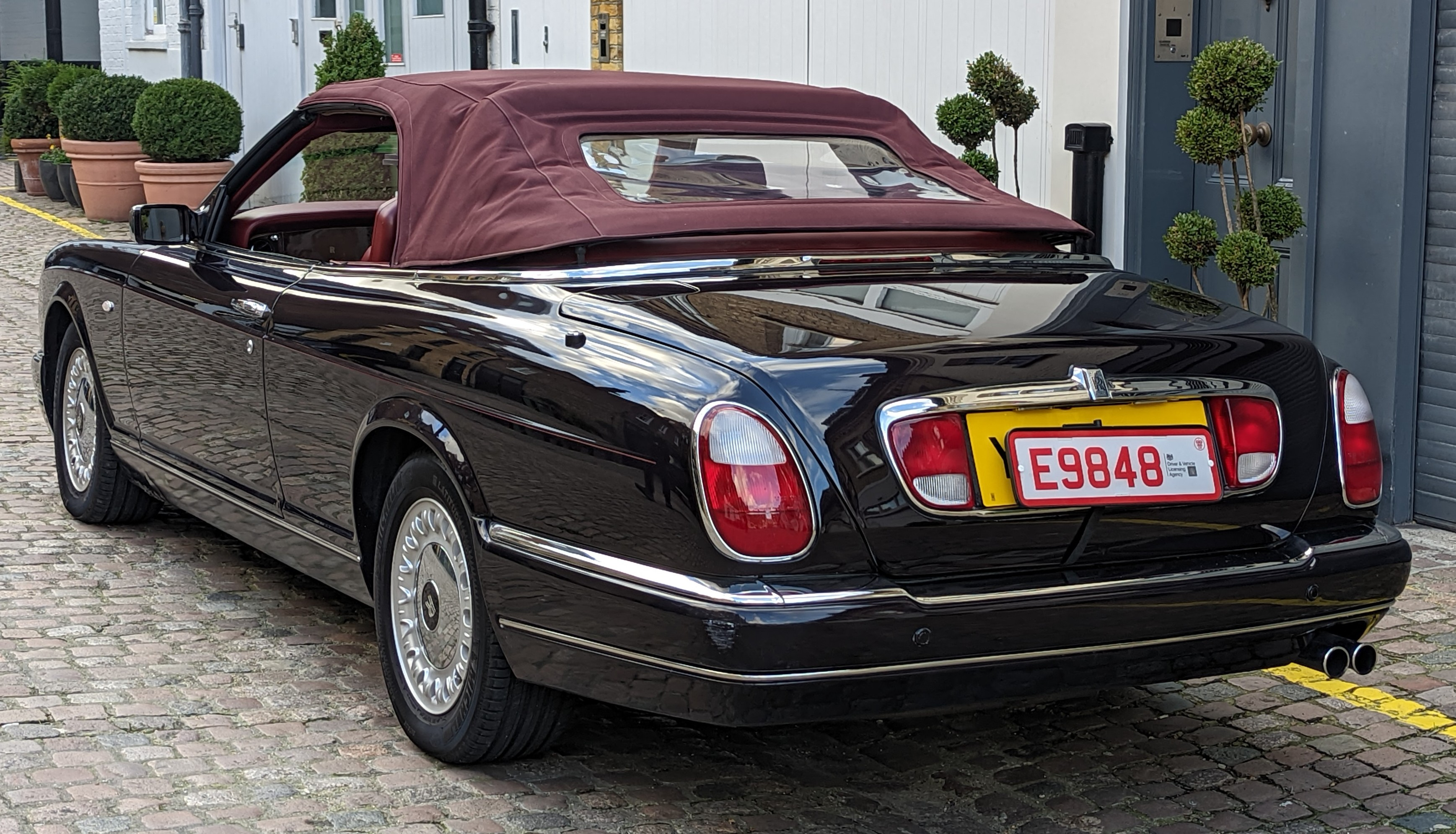
Rolls-Royce Corniche V (Rear)

The interior is upholstered in Connolly Leather and features Wilton wool carpets, lambswool rugs, chrome gauges and a wide choice of exotic wood trims applied to the dashboard, console & waistrails, Dual automatic temperature control, powered adjustable front seats, 2 stage heated seats (front and rear), 4 x 30 watt stereo, tuner, cassette and CD system with six CD changer unit mounted in the front seat armrest with eight speaker system. The exterior has a powered retractable soft top, automatic dual-headlamps with chrome surrounds, powered boot mechanism, 17" Alloy wheels, automatic ride control and Electronic Traction Assistance System (ETAS).

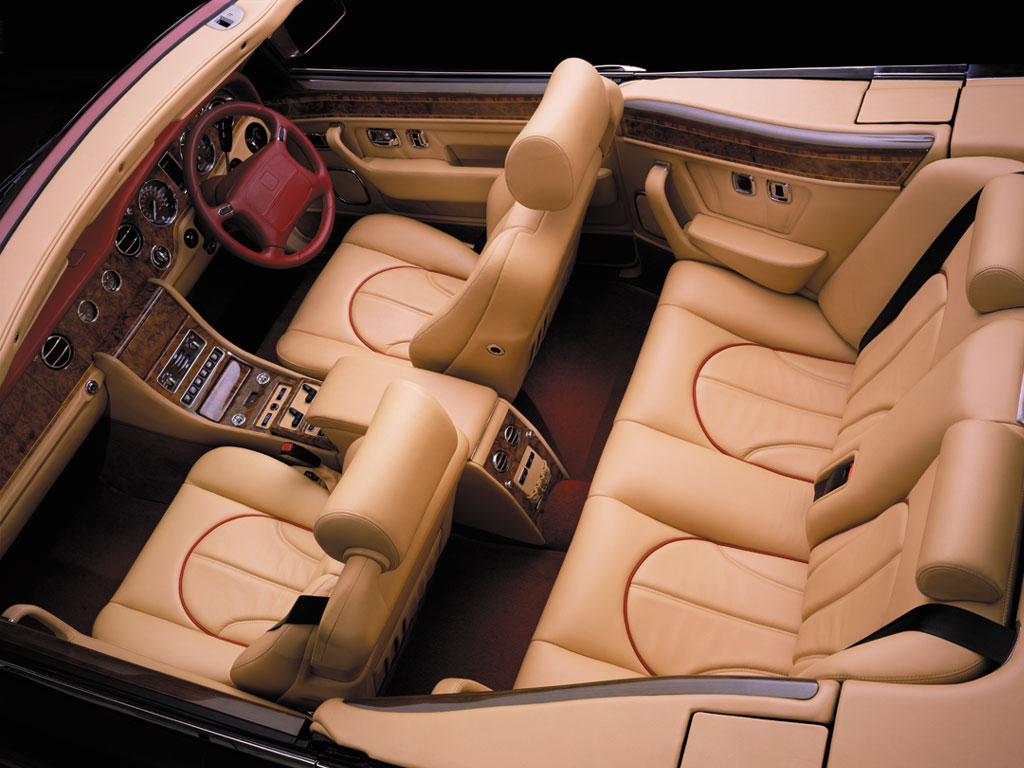
Interior

Styling cues were taken from the Rolls-Royce Silver Seraph sedan, but it shares little mechanically with that BMW-engined car. Instead, the Corniche's V body was set onto the older platform used for the Bentley Azure, the Rolls-Royce SZ platform. Making it the first and only Rolls-Royce developed from a Bentley rather than the other way around, (not withstanding the fact that the Bentley Azure was developed on a Rolls-Royce platform to begin with.)

The Corniche V was the only new Rolls-Royce developed under Volkswagen's ownership, before the marque was sold in 2003. All Corniches were completely hand-built. The car was considered a slightly softer, much more exclusive version of the Azure.

== Corniche V "Final Series" ==
Towards the end of production of the Corniche V, a limited run of 56 "Final Series" cars was planned, 56 being the years in which Rolls-Royce were built at Crewe. Ultimately, only 45 were made out of the original expected 56. They are distinguished by, but not limited to the following:

- Front-fender badges reading “Rolls-Royce Cars, Crewe, England,” with a Union Jack insignia
- Chromed mirror housings
- Restyled & chromed Bentley Azure wheels
- Spirit of Ecstasy Hubcaps
- Red Rolls-Royce badges on the grille and trunk lid
- Rosewood Burr & Cherry Wood trim with Spirit of Ecstasy inlay
- Individually numbered commemorative plaque on the centre console (out of 56)

=== Final Rolls-Royce Corniche V ===
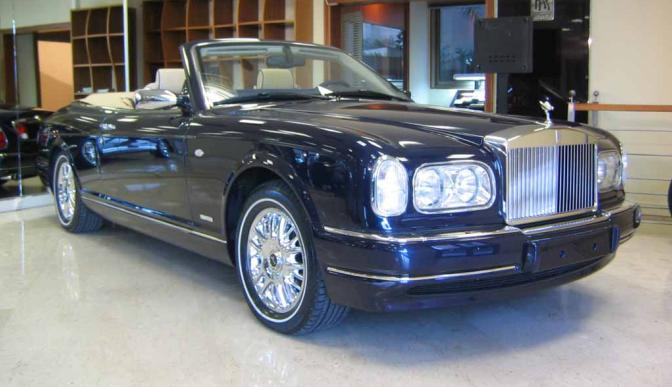
2002 Rolls-Royce Corniche V Final Series

The last Rolls-Royce Corniche (Chassis 2079) was manufactured on 30 August 2002. Along with most features from the "Final Series" specification, It also had a unique seat style: A Chesterfield buttoned theme in spruce Green without seat edge piping, different centre console plaque reading "A Century of Excellence" with the RR logo, and the cities where Rolls-Royces were produced from 1904 to 2002 (in place of the numbered commemorative plaque), silver text inlays on the radio flap reading "The Final Rolls-Royce Corniche Chassis 2079" & treadplates, reading "The Final Rolls-Royce Corniche Chassis 2079 Rolls-Royce Motor Cars, Crewe, England 1946-2002". This was the last Rolls-Royce to be made at Crewe before it was transferred to Bentley models. It was in Rolls-Royce's ownership until September 2018 when it was auctioned off by Bonhams. The production run consisted of 384 cars.

Bentley Azure/Rolls-Royce Corniche body production figures*
| Body | 1994 | 1995 | 1996 | 1997 | 1998 | 1999** | 2000 | 2001 | 2002 | Totals |
|---|---|---|---|---|---|---|---|---|---|---|
| Azure | 3 | 160 | 229 | 200 | 209 | 141 | 189 | 194 | 78 | 1,403 |
| Corniche | - | - | - | - | - | 25 | 250 | 67 | 42 | 384 |
| Totals | 3 | 160 | 229 | 200 | 209 | 166 | 439 | 261 | 120 | 1,787 |

*stated by Pininfarina production records
**From 2 varying documents, newer data used
