= Bentley Continental R =

Grand tourer made by Bentley

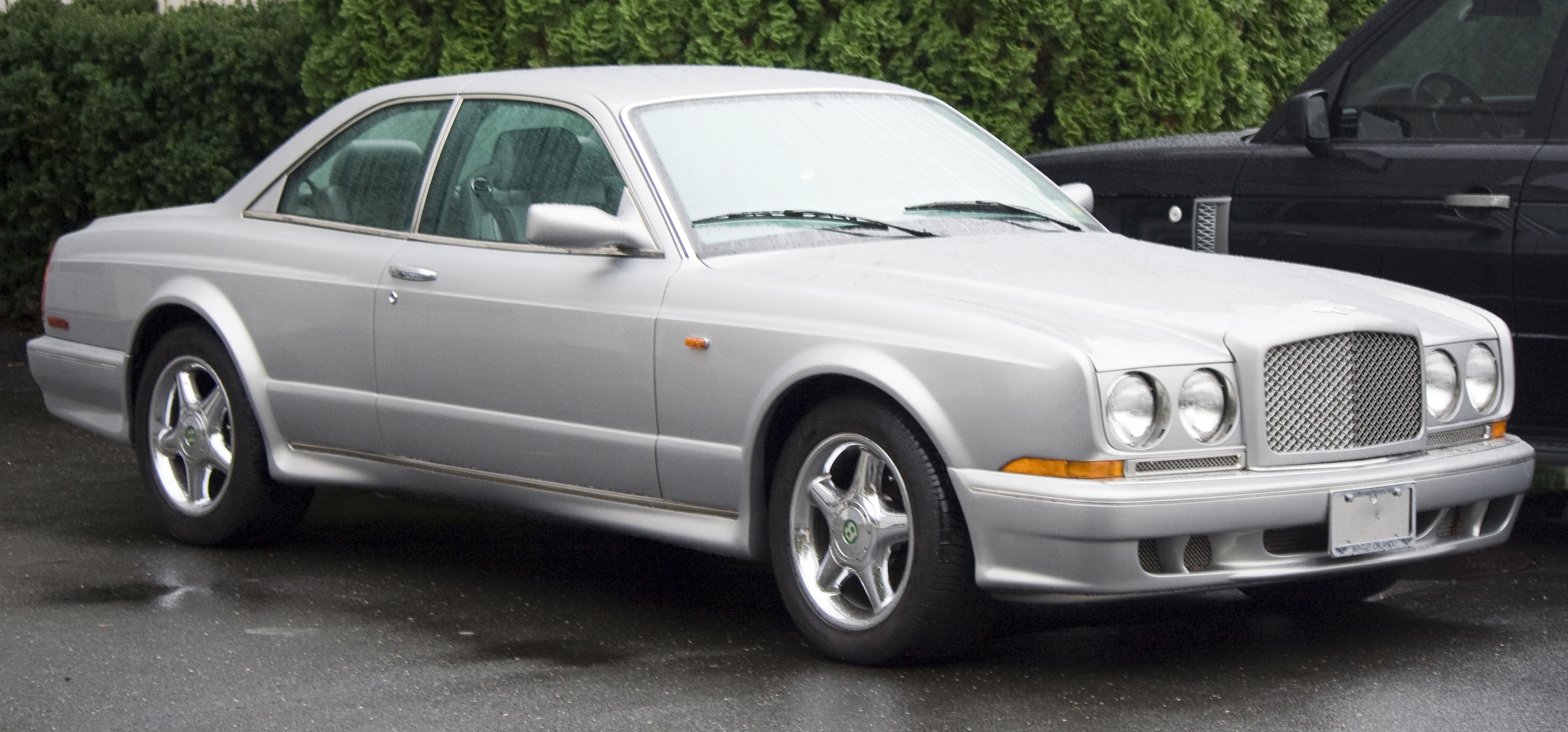

Overview
- Manufacturer: Bentley
- Production: 1991–2003; 1,854 produced
- Assembly: United Kingdom: Crewe (Bentley Crewe)
- Designer: John Heffernan; Ken Greenley

Body and chassis
- Class: Grand tourer (S)
- Body style: 2-door 2+2 coupé (Continental R, S, T); 2-door 2+2 Targa top (Continental SC)
- Layout: Longitudinal front engine, rear-wheel-drive
- Platform: Rolls-Royce SZ
- Related: Bentley Mulsanne; Bentley Azure; Bentley Turbo R

Powertrain
- Engine: 6.75 L turbocharged Bentley V8
- Transmission: 4-speed GM 4L80-E automatic

Dimensions
- Wheelbase: Continental R: 120.5 in (3,061 mm); Continental T: 116.5 in (2,959 mm)
- Length: Continental R: 210.3 in (5,342 mm); Continental T: 206.3 in (5,240 mm)
- Width: 80.5 in (2,045 mm)
- Height: 57.6 in (1,463 mm)
- Kerb weight: 5,340 lb (2,422 kg)

Chronology
- Successor: Bentley Brooklands Coupé (Direct); Bentley Continental GT

The Bentley Continental R is a luxury coupé manufactured by British automobile manufacturer Bentley Motors from 1991 to 2003. It was the first Bentley to feature a body not shared with a Rolls-Royce model since the 1965 S3 Continental and was the first to use the GM 4L80-E transmission. The Continental R was the fastest, most expensive, and most powerful Bentley of its day. It was also the most expensive production car in the world at its introduction. A convertible derivative, called the Bentley Azure, was launched in 1995.

== Origin and the Bentley revival ==
As managing director of Rolls-Royce Motor Cars in the early 1980s under the Vickers ownership, David Plastow could see the potential in the Bentley brand. It had been neglected for the previous 15 years and made up only a very small percentage of the company's sales at that time, particularly outside the UK in important markets such as the USA. The first move in reshaping the brand was to introduce a turbocharged model of the standard Bentley 4-door saloon: as a result, the Bentley Mulsanne Turbo was launched in 1982. On the back of this, Peter Ward, marketing director of the company (and later, managing director), wanted to further enhance the distinctive sporting nature of the Bentley brand and move away from a Bentley that was merely a re-badged Rolls-Royce. They appointed designers John Heffernan and Ken Greenley to come up with ideas for a new, distinctive, Bentley coupé. A fibreglass mock up of the design was displayed at the 1985 Geneva Motor Show as Rolls-Royce's "Project 90" concept of a future Bentley coupé. The concept was met with an enthusiastic reception, but the Project 90 design was largely shelved as the company began to work towards a replacement for the Rolls-Royce Corniche. During this process, Graham Hull, chief designer in house at Rolls-Royce, suggested to the board of directors that the designs sketched for the Corniche would suit a Bentley coupé better. From this point it was decided the Corniche could continue as it was, and efforts would once again be channelled into a new Bentley coupé. In 1986 Graham Hull produced a design rendering of a new Bentley coupé which became the Continental R. Based on the Rolls-Royce SZ platform (which was an evolution of the SY platform), an aerodynamically shaped two-door coupé body had been styled.

John Heffernan and Ken Greenley were officially retained to complete the design of the Continental R. They had run the Automotive Design School at the Royal College of Art and headed to, International Automotive Design (IAD), based in Worthing, Southern England, who production engineered the first prototypes. IAD built a new 4 post 5 axis milling machine just to cut the clay for the Continental prototypes. Greenley and Heffernan liaised constantly throughout the design process with Graham Hull. The interior was entirely the work of Graham Hull and the small in house styling team at Rolls-Royce. The shape of the car was very different from the somewhat slab sided four-door SZ Rolls-Royce and Bentley of the time and offered a much improved coefficient of drag of Cd=0.37. The Continental R also featured roof-cut door frames, a necessity to allow easier access into the car which had a lower roofline than its four-door saloon contemporaries. A subtle spoiler effect was also a feature of the rear. The finished car effectively disguises its huge dimensions (the Continental R is around 4-inch longer than a 2013 long wheelbase Mercedes S Class).

The "Continental" designation recalls the Bentley Continental of the post-war period. The "R" was meant to recall the R Type Bentley models from the 1950s as well as the Turbo R of the 1980s and 90s where the "R" refers to "roadholding".

The revival of the Bentley marque following the introduction of the Bentley Mulsanne Turbo, and then the Continental R, is widely acknowledged to have saved Rolls-Royce Motor cars and formed the groundwork which led to the buyout and parting of the Rolls-Royce and Bentley brands in 1998. Bentley was once again capable of standing alone as a marque in its own right when it was purchased by Volkswagen.

== Launch ==
A completed pre-production Continental R (developed under the codename "Nepal") was secretly taken to Switzerland for a surprise launch of the model at the 1991 Geneva Motor Show (It had been expected the car would be launched in 1992). It was driven from behind a wall on the Rolls-Royce stand. Handel's Zadok the Priest music was chosen for the launch of the new model which was originally written for King George II's coronation in 1727. The Sultan of Brunei, impressed by the new model, purchased the show car at the event for a price of over £2 million. The new Mercedes-Benz W140 also launched at the show, was completely upstaged by the launch of the unexpected, vermilion red, new Bentley Coupé due to the largely positive public reception.

== Model year changes ==
Since its launch in 1991, the 6.75 L Garrett-turbocharged V8 engine from the Turbo R was chosen for use in the Continental R. In early cars (produced from 1991 to 1993) power output of 325 hp (242 kW; 330 PS) at 4,000 rpm and peak torque of 450 lb⋅ft (610 N⋅m) at 2,000 rpm was available, although this was always estimated as at that time, Rolls-Royce still had a policy of not supplying official figures, preferring to describe power output simply as "sufficient".

The car used the new 4-speed GM 4L80-E automatic transmission which had been exhaustively tested by Rolls-Royce, over 1,609,344 km (1,000,000 miles), and modified by them to deliver very high levels of refinement. The car featured self-levelling hydraulic suspension (with adaptive ride/Automatic Ride Control) and ventilated disc brakes at the front with twin calipers. Engine management was done via the MK-Motronic digital fuel injection with fully mapped ignition control system. At launch, advertised top speed was 145 mph (233 km/h), along with a 0–60 mph (97 km/h) acceleration time of 6.6 seconds. The Continental R was priced at US$271,780 in 1992 and £178,000 in the UK at its launch.

All cars were equipped with a centre console mounted electronic gear selector (the first time Rolls-Royce had made a car without the autobox selector on the steering column), with a Sport button to simultaneously adjust gearbox mapping and stiffen the suspension for more aggressive driving and handling. For such a large and heavy car, the Continental R was repeatedly acknowledged by road testers and journalists as displaying superb handling characteristics at high speeds.

Prices of the Continental R in the UK rose to £180,120 in the 1994 model year. That year also saw a number of revisions to the engine, including revisions to the cylinder heads courtesy of Cosworth (another company within the Vickers group, alongside Rolls-Royce and Bentley). The alloy wheels were also increased in diameter to 17-inch and were of a completely new 7 spoke design. Power output of the engine was now estimated at 360 hp (268 kW; 365 PS) at 4,000 rpm and peak torque 500 lb⋅ft (678 N⋅m) at 2,000 rpm.

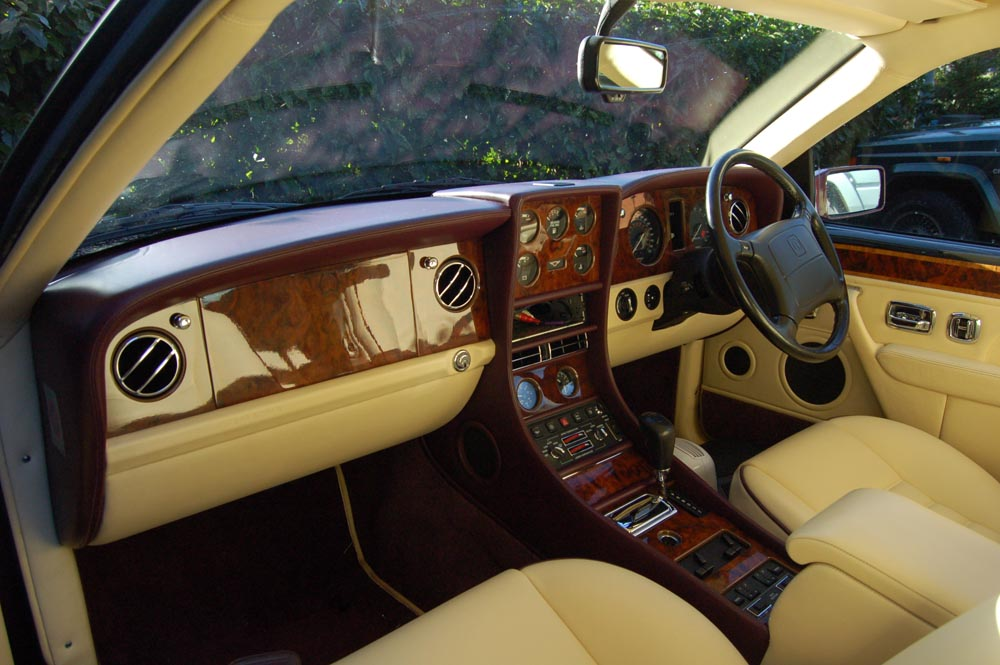
1996 Bentley Continental R interior finished in magnolia & wildberry colour

By the 1996 model year, the Continental R was priced at £187,354 in the UK. The year saw some of the most significant changes since the launch of the car, notably the inclusion of the liquid cooled chargecooler as standard, along with an improved Zytek EMS3 engine management system which meant improvement in throttle response and fuel efficiency along with a digitally controlled turbo over-boost. Power output of the engine was increased as a result, and a change in policy by Rolls-Royce: this was the first time performance figures were officially released by the manufacturer, departing from a long tradition of describing performance as "adequate" or "sufficient". Probably the reason for this is because the figures were very impressive: 385 hp (287 kW; 390 PS) at 4,000 rpm and torque of 550 lb⋅ft (746 N⋅m) starting to be available at only 2,000 rpm, and available up to 4,000 rpm (according to UK brochure). No other production car in the world at the time delivered such levels of torque. This lead British publication Autocar to suggest, when road testing the 1996 Continental R in August 1995, that the gearbox would've been destroyed due to the enormous levels of low down torque available. 0–60 mph (97 km/h) was now officially quoted by Rolls-Royce as "sub 6 seconds" along with a top speed of 155 mph (249 km/h), according to the UK brochure. The 1996 model year also saw revised 17-inch alloy wheels and steering wheel tilt adjustment for the first time. This was electrically adjustable and so could now be set as part of the seat and wing mirror memory positions. Electronic Traction Assistance System began to appear on the later 1996 model year cars.

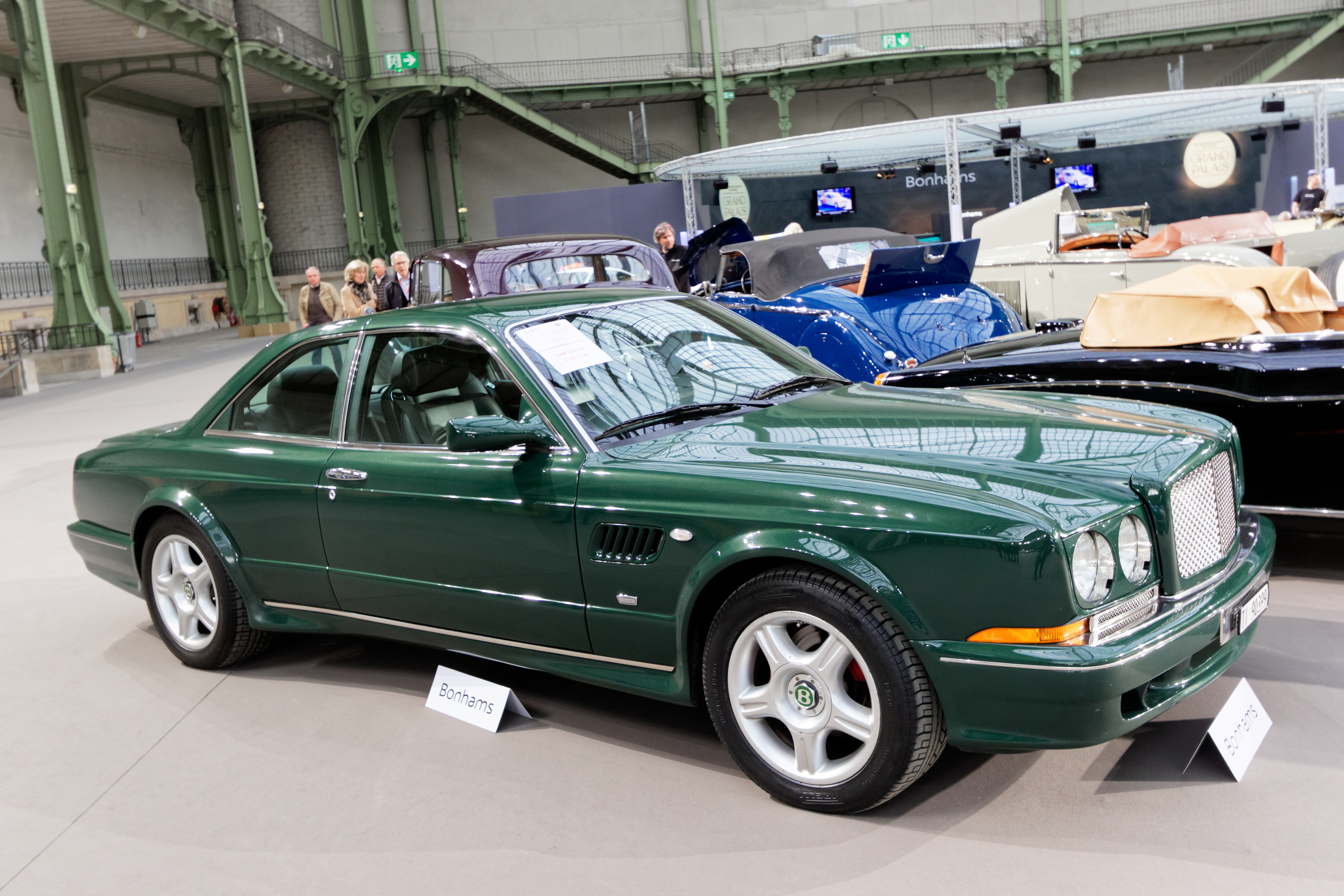
Bentley Continental R Le Mans

In the 1998 model year, the electronic traction assistance system was included as standard and some cosmetic changes were made. Power and torque of the engine remained the same as before, but 0–97 km/h acceleration time was now quoted as "6 seconds". The cosmetic revisions included fitting the same front seats as fitted to the convertible Azure, which were shared with the BMW 8 Series and trimmed by Rolls-Royce, featuring an integrated seat belt. Other revisions included small mesh vents below the headlights, laser-cut mesh radiator grille as standard, revised alloy wheels and minor changes to front and rear bumpers.

Between 1999 and the end of production in 2003, Bentley indulged customers in a variety of special customised cars under their Personal Commission programme with a number of cars fitted with the 420-horsepower (313 kW; 426 PS) engine including the Le Mans, Continental R, Continental R 420 and Millennium. A total of 194 Continental R cars had the 420 engine – some of which were also wide body cars.

== Models ==
=== Continental S ===
The Continental S was a limited-edition performance model introduced in 1994 and 1995 with a liquid cooled chargecooler added. Only thirty seven were produced and offered to established Bentley customers. The late Alan Clark MP was one such owner. This engine had an estimated output of 385 hp (287 kW; 390 PS), and 0–60 mph (97 km/h) acceleration time improved to 6.1 seconds.

=== Continental R California Edition ===
The Continental R California Edition was a limited edition of 6 wide body coupés produced in 1998. Other than the California Editions one other wide body car was made in 1998. Number six was fitted with the full-spec Continental T engine that just became available in 1998 with a power output of 420 hp (313 kW; 426 PS) and a maximum torque of 650 lb⋅ft (881 N⋅m). This car was the first Continental R model to be fitted with this engine. The larger dual-caliper brakes were also fitted to number six as well as numerous other features that later were incorporated into the 2000 2003 Continental R420 including push button start, eight gauges, and other unique features. There is speculation there were actually seven, and it is the 7th that had the description above for the "6th" car.

=== Continental R Mulliner ===
The Continental R Mulliner model range, offered from March 1999, was introduced at the Geneva Motor Show. The Bentley Continental R Mulliner was equipped with the same engine as the Continental T. This engine had a power output of 420 hp (313 kW; 426 PS) and a maximum torque of 650 lb⋅ft (881 N⋅m). The car has an estimated top speed of 170 mph (274 km/h). The 0–60 mph (97 km/h) acceleration time dropped to 5.6 seconds. One of the reasons the Continental R Mulliner came into existence, were the customers who wanted the power of the Continental T in the longer wheelbase R. The T was 4 in (102 mm) shorter than the R, fully at the expense of space for the rear passengers.

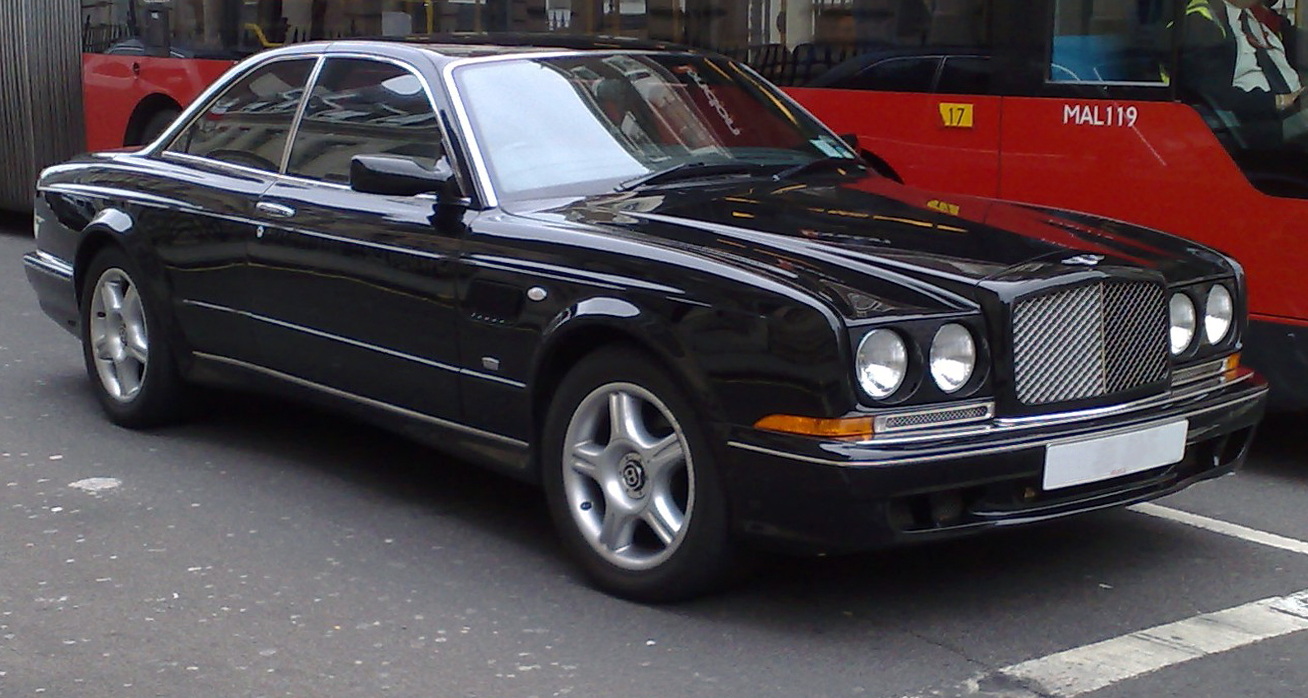
Continental R Mulliner

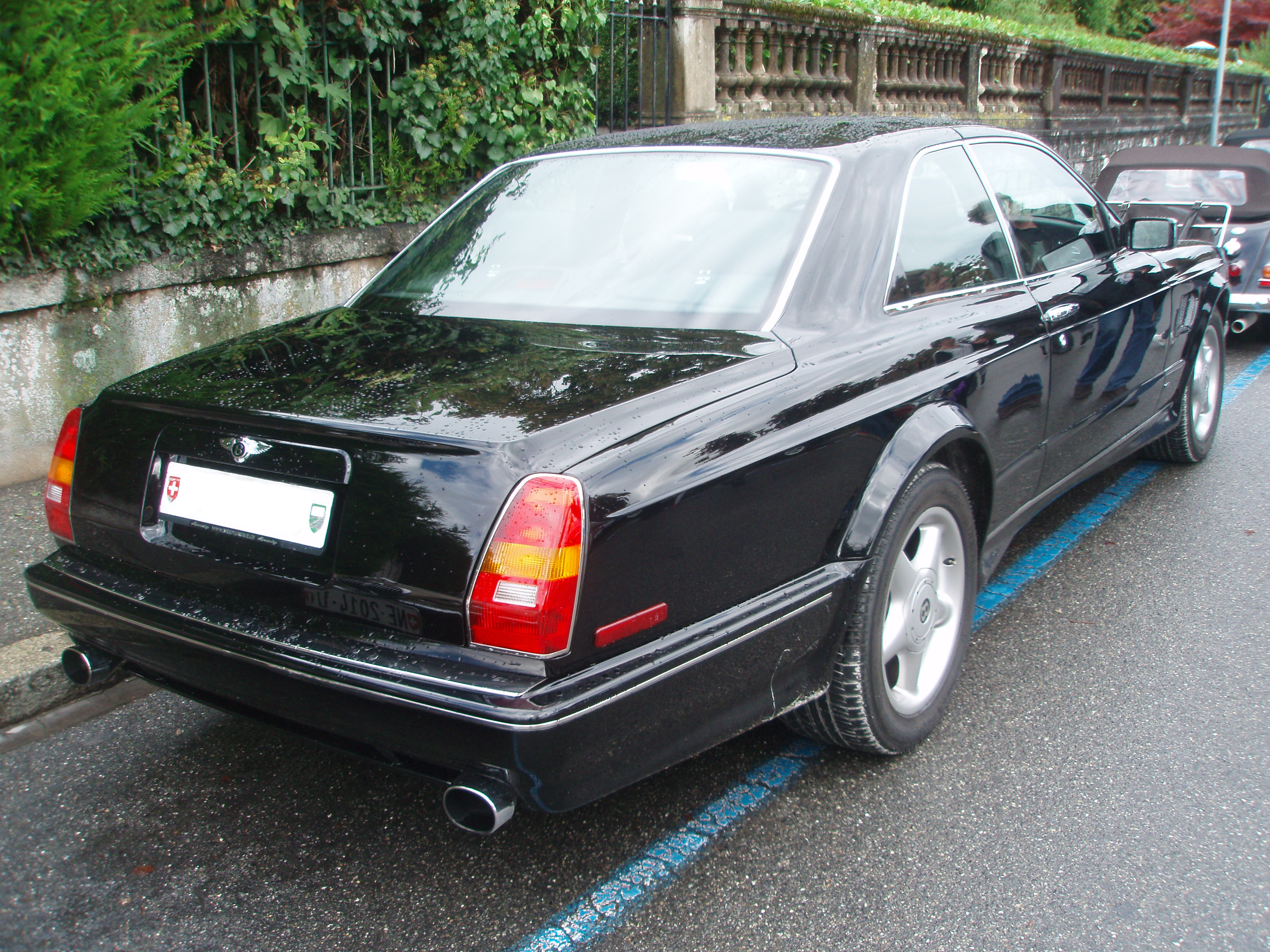
Rear view

=== Continental T ===
Launched in 1996, the Bentley Continental T was a short wheelbase version of the Continental R offering more power, torque and responsive handling, at the expense of rear passenger leg room.

At its launch, the Bentley Continental T offered an additional 15 hp (11 kW) over the 1996 Continental R, at 400 hp (298 kW), and an additional 40 lb⋅ft (54 N⋅m) of torque at 590 lb⋅ft (800 N⋅m). For the 1998 model year, this was increased to 420 hp (313 kW; 426 PS) and 650 lb⋅ft (881 N⋅m) of torque available at only 2,200 rpm. The Continental T has a more athletic outward appearance due to a 102 mm (4 in) shorter wheelbase and extended front and rear wheel arches. The T had larger brake discs and full front brake calipers. It was also equipped with ABS brakes.

The interior featured a turned-metal dashboard with chrome-finished instruments (as opposed to the wood finish in the Continental R), lambswool carpets and a polished aluminium trim, although some cars were specified with traditional wood trim. The Continental T's engine responded to a separate push-button starter. Performance, due to 200 lb (91 kg) less weight, was slightly better than the Continental R cars with the same engine. Due to its shorter wheelbase and compact interior, the Continental T was classified as a subcompact car by the EPA.

Performance figures included a 0–60 mph (97 km/h) time of 6.2 seconds and a quarter-mile time of 14.5 seconds at 98.3 mph (158.2 km/h) along with a slalom speed of 62.2 mph (100.1 km/h) while the top speed was an estimated 170 mph (274 km/h).

It was at least 21 percent more expensive than the R, and 7 percent more expensive, than the Azure convertible.

The Bentley Continental T Mulliner was introduced in 1999. Modified shock absorbers in combination with stiffer torsion bars (front +40%, rear +20%) increased the Continental's handling ability.

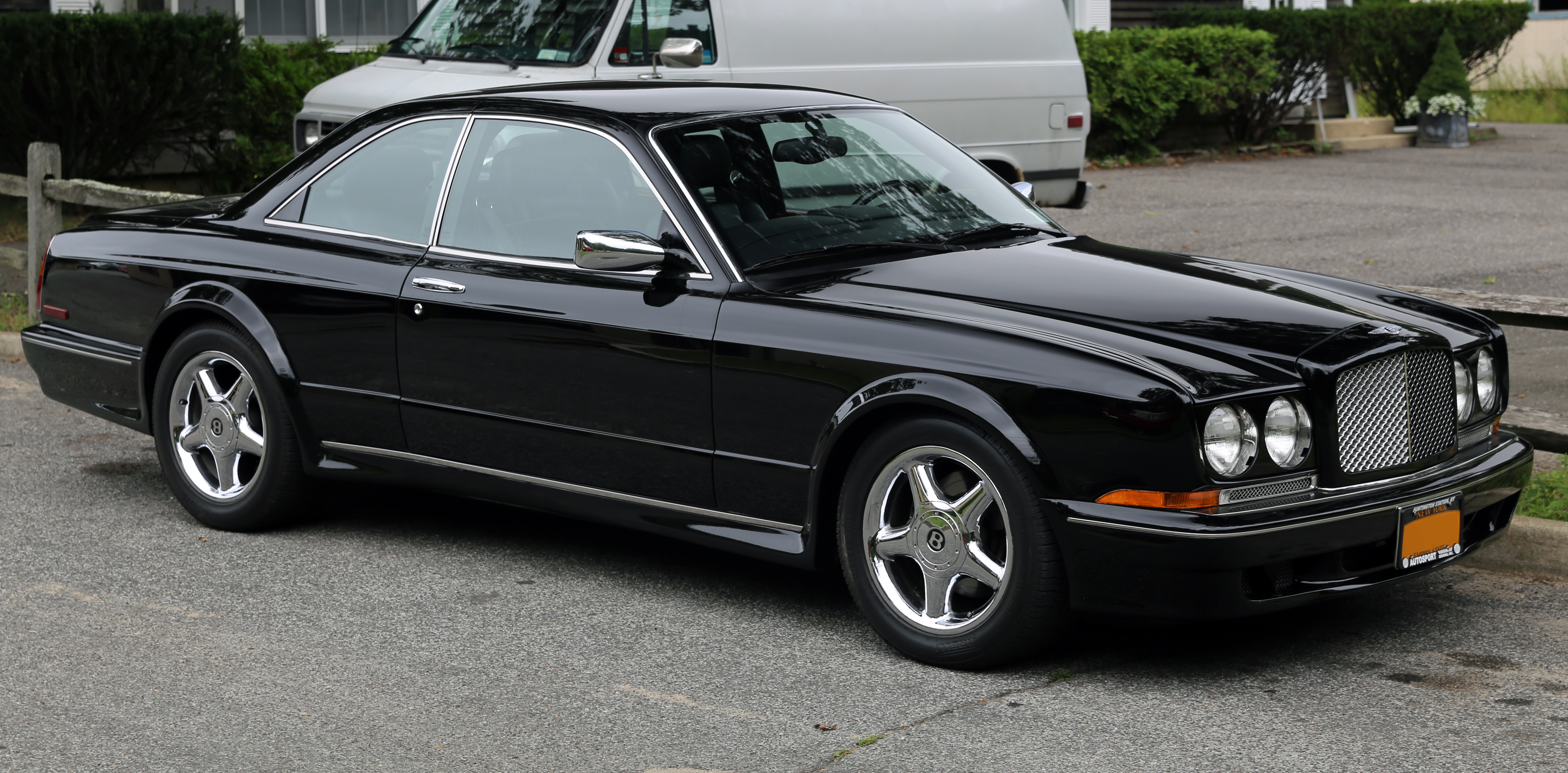
Bentley Continental T

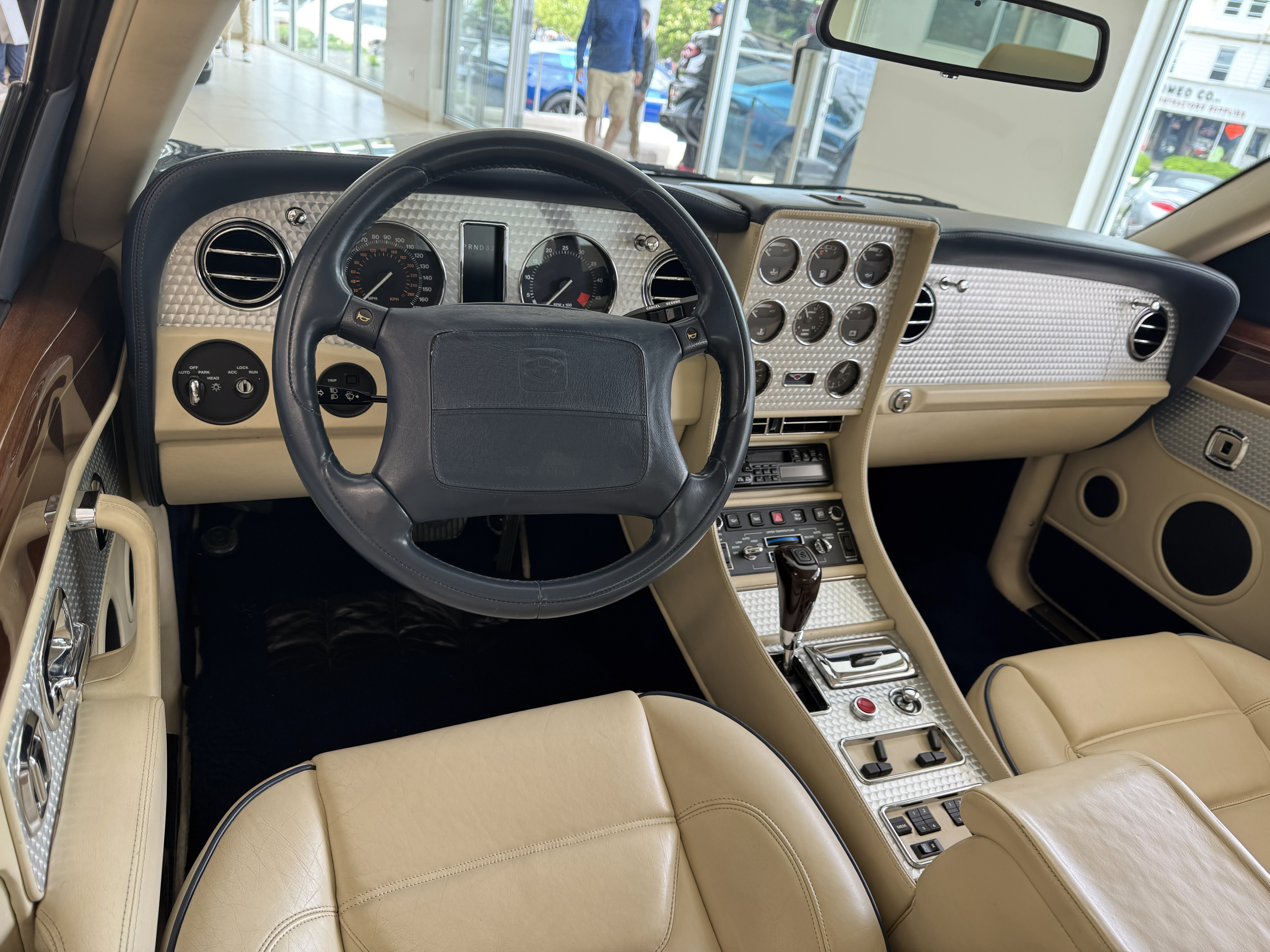
Interior; the machine-turned aluminium dash was standard on the T

=== Continental Sedanca Coupé (SC) ===
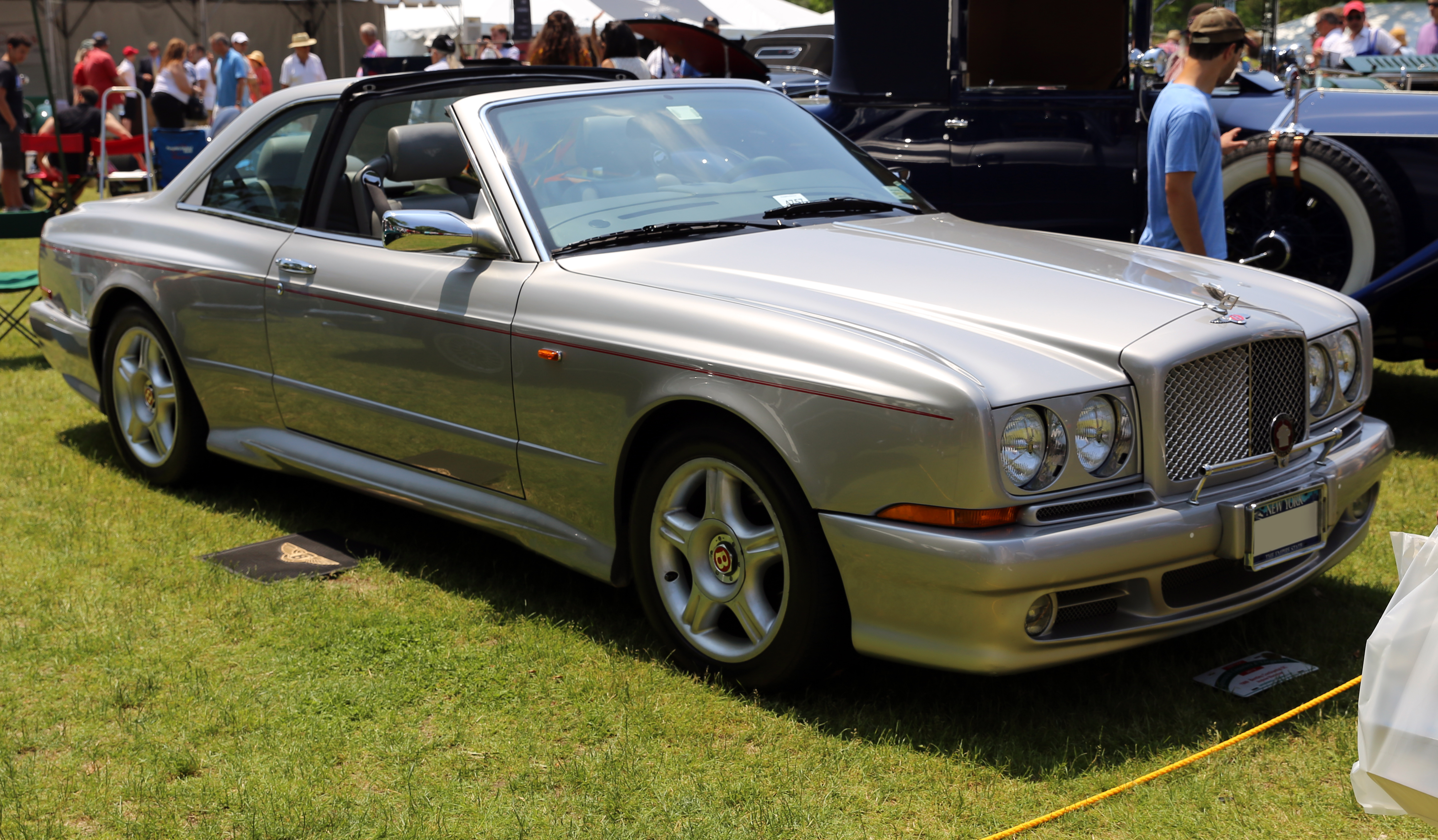
Bentley Continental Sedanca Coupé

The Continental SC 'Sedanca Coupé' was a 1999 limited production version of the Continental T with a removable roof panel over the front seats. A total of 79 cars were built with 6 being completed with the Mulliner package and 48 being left hand drive.

=== Continental R Final Series ===
Near the end of production of the Continental R, Bentley built the last eleven cars under the "Final Series". Six of which being LHD, all under the 2003 model year.

== Blackpool cars ==
The launch of the Continental R had the effect of stimulating the imagination and demands of some of the world's wealthiest individuals. Throughout the 1990s, Rolls-Royce was tasked with developing numerous special cars for such customers, a service beyond that of mere customisation. Code named "Blackpool cars", these were highly bespoke automobiles, generally based on the Continental R, but with unique body shells often costing several million pounds to tool up, from which a handful of examples would be made. The best known customer for these cars was the Sultan of Brunei who had numerous unique automobiles made reportedly placing orders worth tens of millions of pounds with Rolls-Royce during this period.

== End of production ==
The production of the Continental R ceased in 2003 and it was the last car still based on the SZ Rolls-Royce Silver Spirit platform (4 door cars based on the same platform had already been superseded in 1998 by the new Bentley Arnage / Rolls-Royce Silver Seraph) and with features unique to the company which have disappeared on cars built since, such as floor mounted brake and accelerator pedals, sill level floors and mineral oil suspension and braking systems.

=== Production figures ===
- Continental R/S: 1,504
  - Continental R (1991–2002): 1,236
  - Continental S (1994–1995): 37
  - Continental R California Edition (1998): 6
  - Continental R (2000) Millennium Edition: 10
  - Continental R Mulliner (1999–2003): 131
  - Continental R 420 (2000–2003): 38
  - Continental R Le Mans (2001): 46
- Continental T: 350
  - Continental T (1996–2002): 322
  - Continental T Mulliner (1999): 23
  - Continental T Le Mans (2001): 5
  - Continental SC (1999): 73
  - Continental SC Mulliner (1999): 6
