= Vickers plc =

Former British manufacturing company

- Industry: Defence, engineering, marine engineering
- Founded: 17 April 1867; 159 years ago as Vickers Limited; 1998 renamed Vickers Engineering; 2003 renamed Vinters Engineering
- Defunct: 1999
- Fate: Purchased by Rolls-Royce plc and renamed Vinters Engineering
- Successor: Vinters Engineering Limited and Alvis Vickers
- Headquarters: United Kingdom
- Parent: Vickers-Armstrongs
- Subsidiaries: Vickers Defence Systems; Cosworth

Vickers plc was the remainder of Vickers-Armstrongs after the nationalisation of three of its four operating groups: aviation (as a 50% share since 1960 of British Aircraft Corporation (BAC) in 1977), shipbuilding (Vickers Limited Shipbuilding Group in 1977) and steel. It was purchased by Rolls-Royce plc in 1999, and the Vickers company name became defunct in 2003 as Rolls renamed the company Vinters Engineering.

== History ==
The company was created in 1977 from the rump of Vickers-Armstrongs following the nationalisation of its aviation, shipbuilding and steel businesses. The name was first used by the Vickers family for Vickers Limited – at first a Sheffield steel foundry and later a manufacturing conglomerate – from 1867 to 1927.

During the 1980s the company acquired businesses in the automotive engineering sector (principally Rolls-Royce Motors), the defence sector (principally Royal Ordnance Factory Leeds) and the marine engineering sector (principally Kamewa and Ulstein).

Rolls-Royce plc purchased Vickers plc for £576 million in 1999 for its marine engineering businesses. In 2002, Vickers Defence Systems was purchased by Alvis plc to form the subsidiary Alvis Vickers. In 2003, Rolls-Royce renamed its Vickers subsidiaries Vinters Engineering plc. The Vickers name lived on in Alvis Vickers.

In 2004, the board of the parent group Alvis approved a £309m takeover bid by the American defence company General Dynamics. Within three months BAE Systems, which already held a 29% stake, bid £355m for the company; this was seen as a defence of the home market from a foreign rival. The bid was accepted by the majority of shareholders. In September 2004, BAE announced the creation of BAE Systems Land Systems, a new company bringing together the BAE subsidiaries, RO Defence and Alvis Vickers, which saw the end of the Vickers name after 176 years. In 2005, the acquisition of United Defense led to the creation of BAE Systems Land and Armaments Group.

== Businesses ==
=== Automotive engineering ===
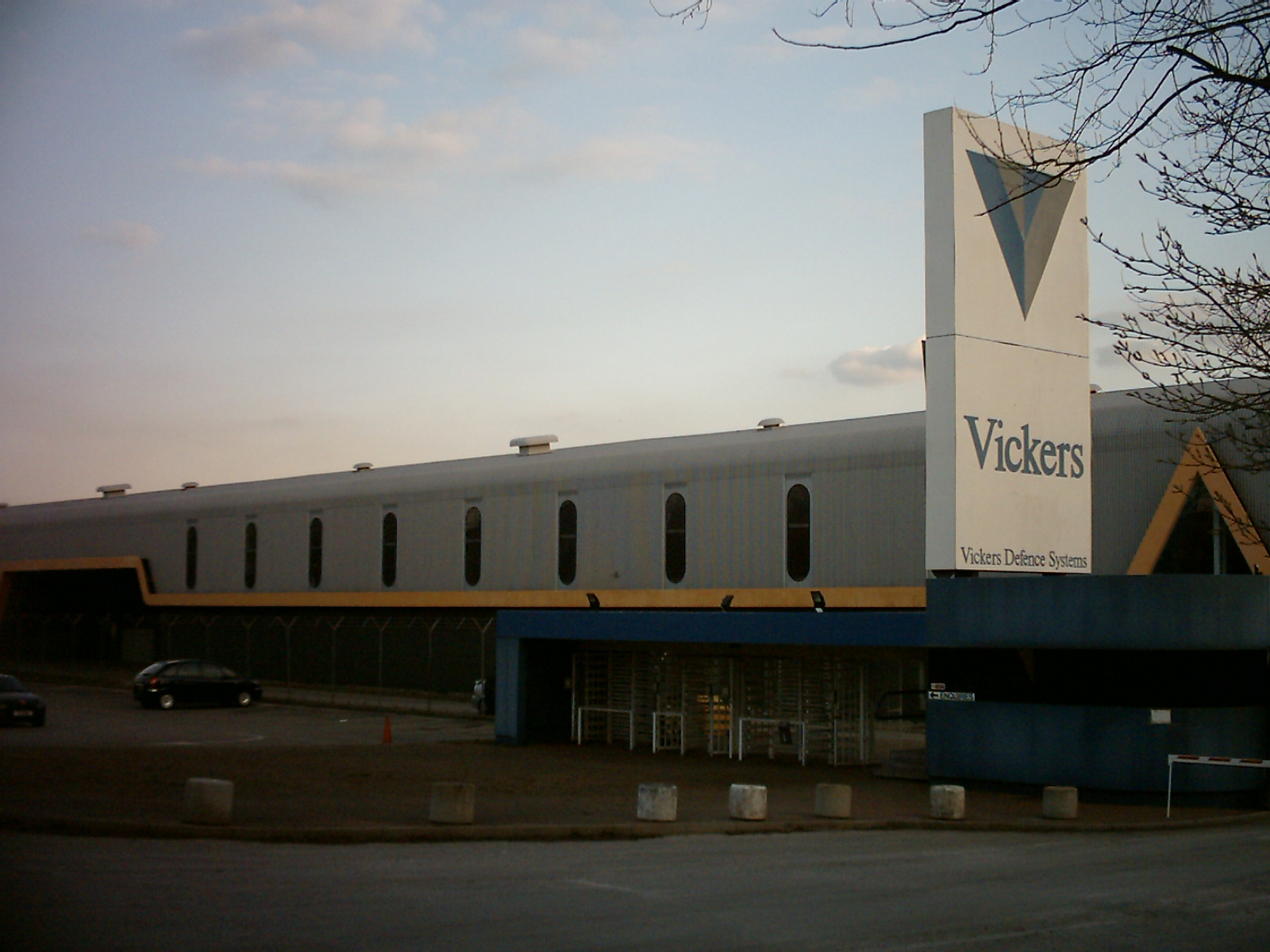
The Vickers plant in Cross Gates, Leeds, 2009

In 1980, Vickers plc acquired Rolls-Royce Motors. This was not Vickers' first involvement with Rolls-Royce. In 1966, Rolls-Royce Limited (the original aero-engine and motor car company) acquired Bristol Aeroplane for its Bristol Siddeley engine business, but declared it had no interest in Bristol's 20% shareholding in BAC; Vickers Armstrong and English Electric (EE) each having 40% of BAC's shares. Despite this declaration, Rolls-Royce had not disposed of its BAC stake when the former was declared bankrupt in 1971. The 20% share was eventually acquired from receivership by Vickers and GEC (EE's parent company). In 1990, the Cosworth automotive engineering group was purchased.

Vickers divested its automotive interests in 1998, selling Cosworth and Rolls-Royce Motors to Volkswagen Group. The disposal of Rolls-Royce was a complicated affair, involving BMW and legal issues surrounding the use of trademarks which were shared with Rolls-Royce plc.

=== Defence ===
In 1986, Royal Ordnance Factory Leeds was purchased and became the core of Vickers Defence Systems. These interests were primarily centred on land warfare products and brought the Challenger 1 tank into Vickers' portfolio. Vickers would later develop this into the Challenger 2, the current main battle tank of the British Army and Oman. In 1999 Reumech, owner of OMC, the South African defence company was purchased and renamed as Vickers OMC. In 2004, Vickers OMC was sold to BAE Systems.

=== Marine engineering ===
Since 1970, Vickers had been the parent of the Scottish Brown Brothers group, which produced marine steering gear and stabilisers. In 1986, it purchased Kamewa, a Swedish manufacturer of waterjets, followed in 1998 by Ulstein (Norway), a major marine propulsion and engineering company. The companies were formed up as Vickers Ulstein Marine.
