= Bentley Azure =

British series of convertible cars

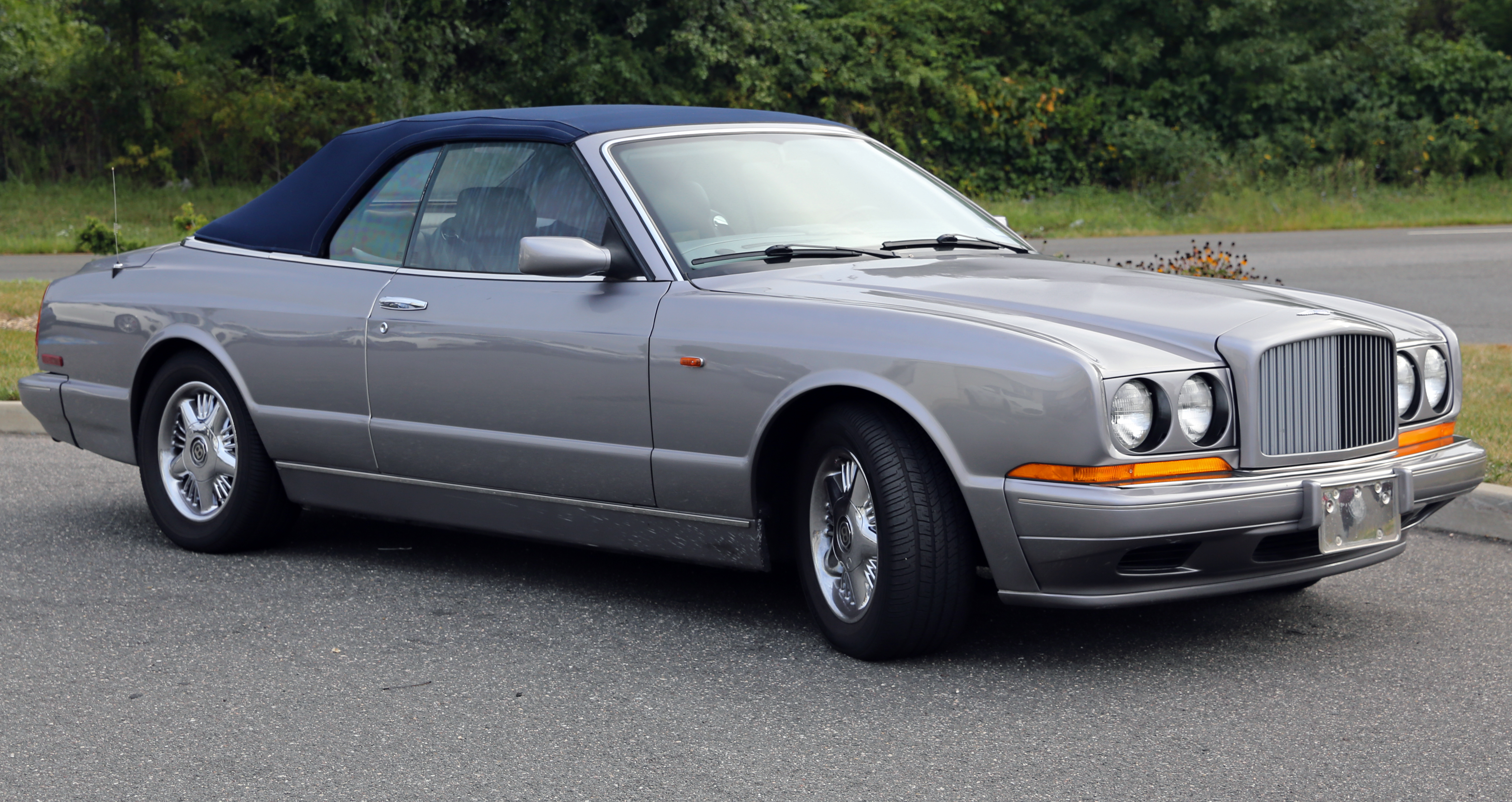
1996 Bentley Azure

The Bentley Azure is a four-seater convertible grand tourer produced by British automobile manufacturer Bentley Motors. The first version debuted in 1995 on the Bentley Continental R platform and was made until 2003. After a three-year break, a completely new version debuted in 2006 and was produced until 2010. It was powered by a significantly updated engine and based on the newer Arnage platform.

== First generation (1995–2003) ==
Bentley Azure (1st generation)
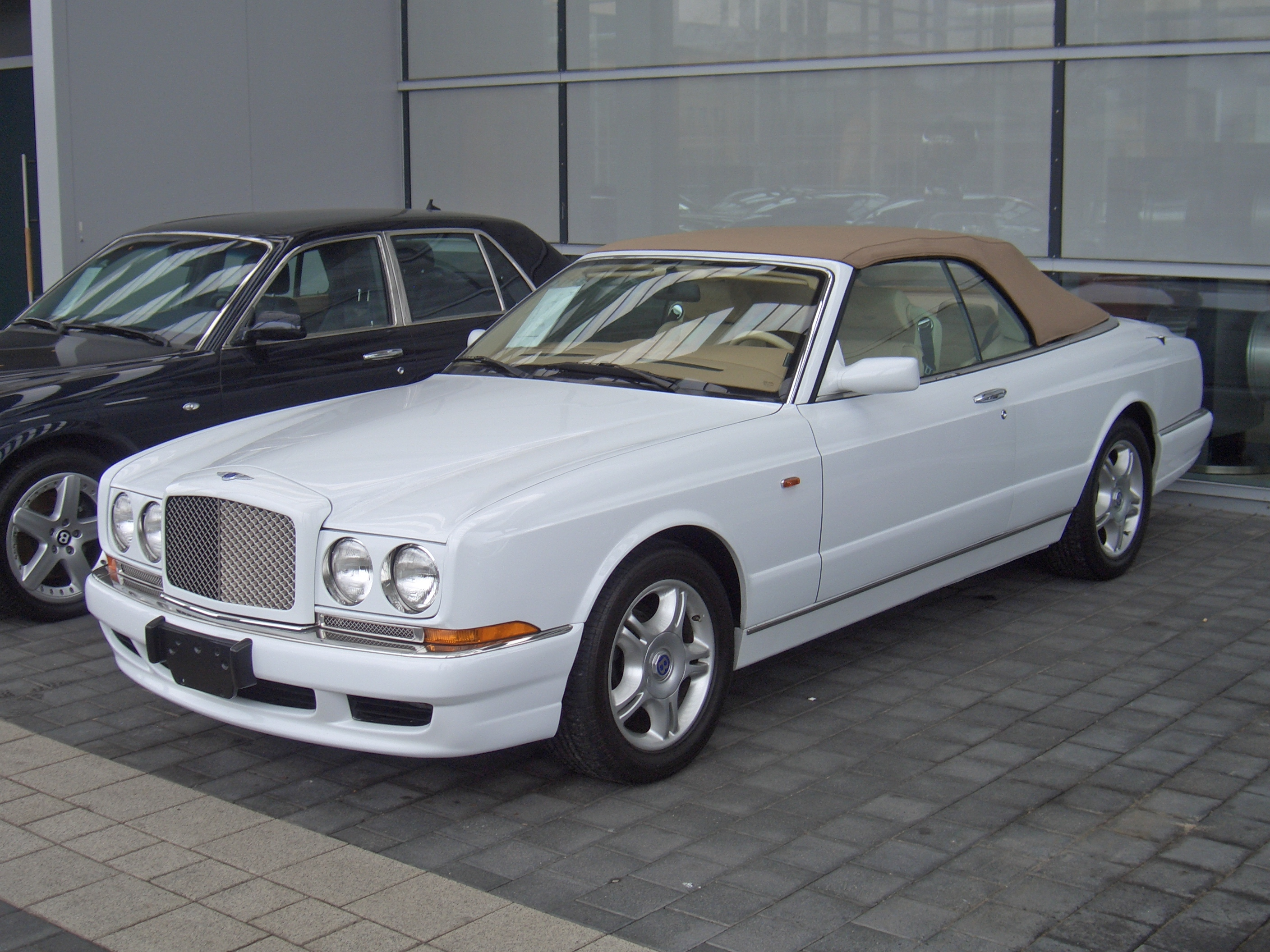

Overview
- Manufacturer: Bentley Motors
- Production: 1995–2003; 1,403 Produced
- Assembly: United Kingdom: Crewe (Bentley Crewe: final assembly); Italy: Cambiano (Pininfarina S.p.A.)

Body and chassis
- Class: Grand tourer (S)
- Body style: 2-door convertible
- Layout: Front-engine, rear-wheel-drive
- Platform: Rolls-Royce SZ
- Related: Bentley Continental R; Bentley Brooklands; Rolls-Royce Corniche (2000)

Powertrain
- Engine: 6.75 L turbocharged Bentley L410 MT 1T V8
- Transmission: 4-speed GM 4L80-E automatic

Dimensions
- Wheelbase: 3,061 mm (120.5 in)
- Length: 5,350 mm (210.6 in)
- Width: 1,880 mm (74.0 in)
- Height: 1,475 mm (58.1 in)
- Kerb weight: 2,610 kg (5,754 lb)

Chronology
- Predecessor: Bentley Continental Convertible

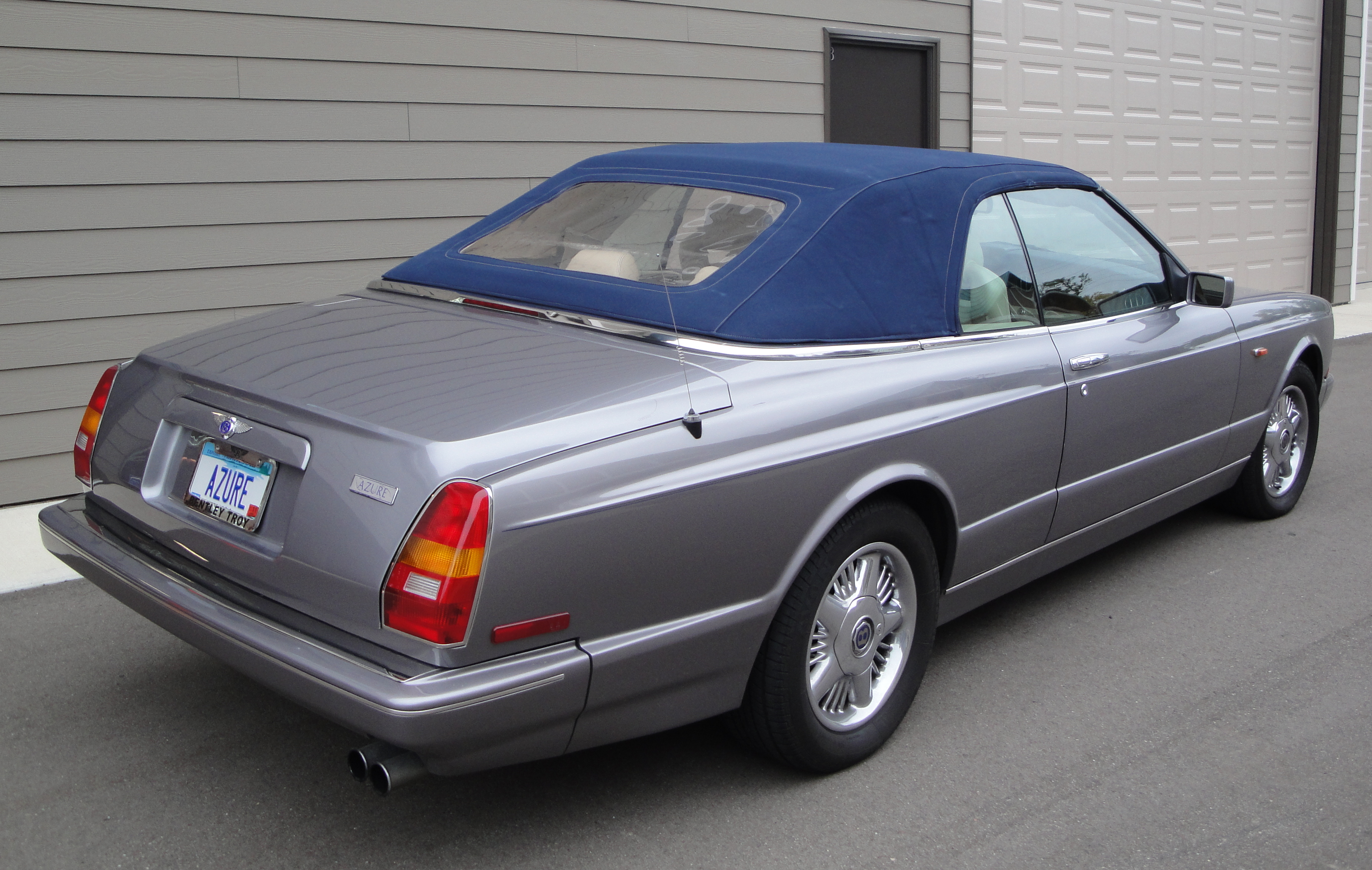
Rear view

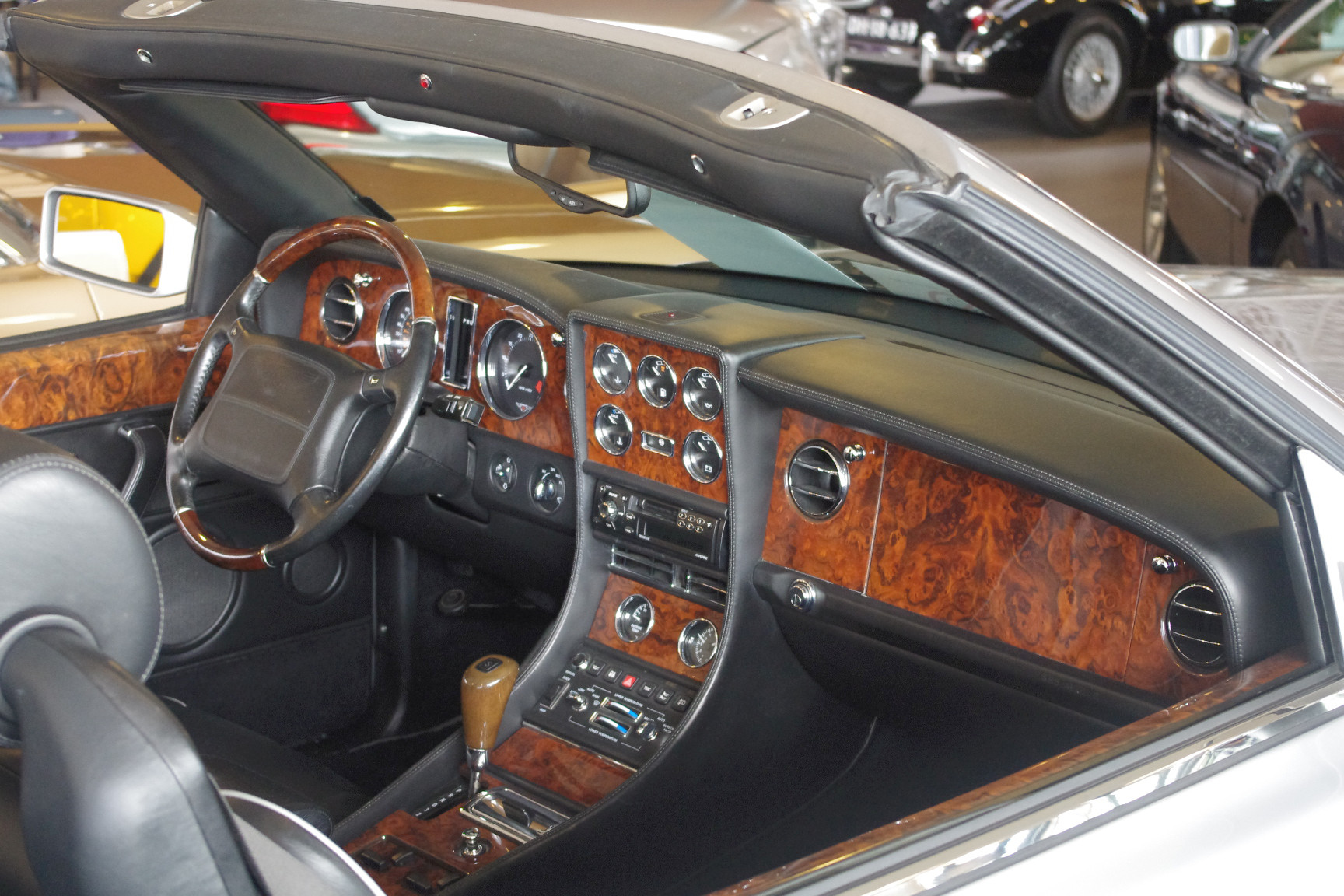
Interior

The name was taken from earlier Robert Jankel sportier 2-door conversions that evolved into the Continental R. The Azure debuted in March 1995 at the Geneva Motor Show on the platform of the Continental R model, which had been originally launched in 1991. Production only crept to a start, with a mere nine examples finished in the first year – in 1996, after full production had started, no less than 251 cars were finished. Pininfarina assisted in the two-year process of turning the Continental R into a full four-seater convertible, and also built the shell and soft-top at their factory in Italy, largely from parts sourced in the UK. Final assembly was then carried out at Crewe. A roll-bar was never considered, which necessitated extensive reinforcing of the chassis. At 210 in (5,340 mm) in length and 2,608 kg (5,750 lb) in weight, the Azure often surprised onlookers with its size and bulk, intended to both convey a sense of "presence" and allow for comfortable seating of four adult passengers.

Power came from the company's stalwart 6.75-litre V8, featuring a single, intercooled Garrett turbocharger and rated in the region of 365 PS (268 kW; 360 hp) – Rolls-Royce and Bentley did not yet give official power numbers at the time of the Azure's introduction. By the time production began in earnest, a new engine management system from Zytek meant a slight power increase to 390 PS (287 kW; 385 hp) at 4,000 rpm and 750 N⋅m (553 lb⋅ft) of torque at 2,000 rpm; power was routed to the rear wheels via a modified, General Motors sourced, four-speed 4L80-E automatic transmission. With a 0-100 km/h (62 mph) acceleration time of 6.5 seconds and a top speed of 241 km/h (150 mph), the Azure was very fast for a car of its size, weight and poor aerodynamic profile.

Owing to the limited space and workforce at Bentley's Crewe factory, the Azure's electrically powered convertible top made from thick fabric was designed and manufactured by Pininfarina, which significantly added to the vehicle's cost. New in 1995, the Azure was priced at £215,167 – £22,590 more than the Continental R on which it was based.

From 1999 until the end of production, the Azure was also available in "Mulliner" trim, which added special bespoke trim and additional equipment and allowed the buyer the option for further customisation during the build-process; pricing varied by car, as equipment could be significantly different from one to the next depending on customer requests.

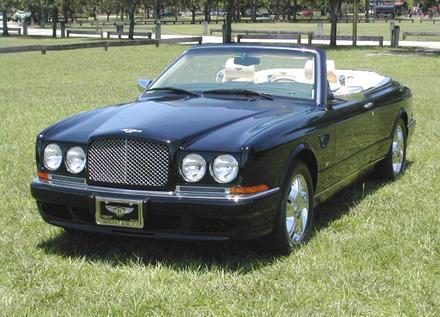
2003 Bentley Azure "Final Series Performance"

Just like its Rolls-Royce counterpart, towards the end of its production, it also had a final edition, called "Final series performance", created from 2002 to 2003, only 62 were made. The Last RHD sold being Chassis no. CH01228 while the very last Azure was retained at the Crewe plant.

Bentley Azure/Rolls-Royce Corniche body production figures*
Body	1994	1995	1996	1997	1998	1999**	2000	2001	2002	Totals
Azure	3	160	229	200	209	141	189	194	78	1,403
Corniche	0	0	0	0	0	25	250	67	42	384
Totals	3	160	229	200	209	166	439	261	120	1,787

*stated by Pininfarina production records
**From 2 varying documents, newer data used

== Second generation (2006–2010) ==
Bentley Azure (2nd generation)
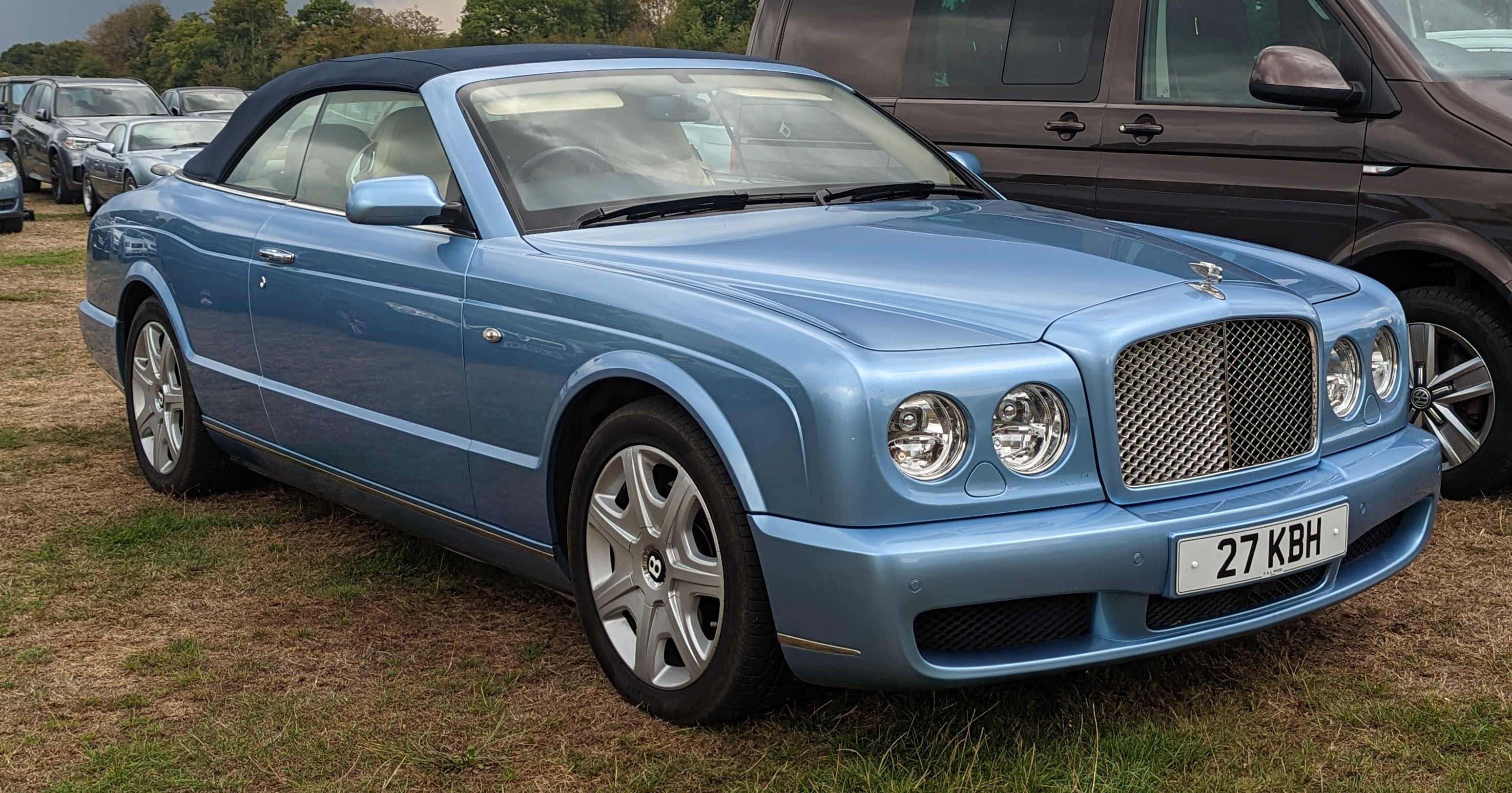

Overview
- Manufacturer: Bentley Motors
- Production: 2006–2010
- Assembly: United Kingdom: Crewe (Bentley Crewe)
- Designer: Dirk van Braeckel, Raul Pires

Body and chassis
- Class: Grand tourer (S)
- Body style: 2-door 2+2 convertible
- Layout: Front-engine, rear-wheel-drive
- Related: Bentley Arnage; Bentley Brooklands Coupé

Powertrain
- Engine: 6.75 L twin-turbo Bentley V8
- Transmission: 6-speed ZF 6HP-32 automatic

Dimensions
- Wheelbase: 3,117 mm (122.7 in)
- Length: 5,400 mm (212.6 in)
- Width: 74.8 in (1,900 mm) (with mirrors: 83.7 in (2,125 mm))
- Height: 1,491 mm (58.7 in)
- Kerb weight: 2,695 kg (5,941 lb)

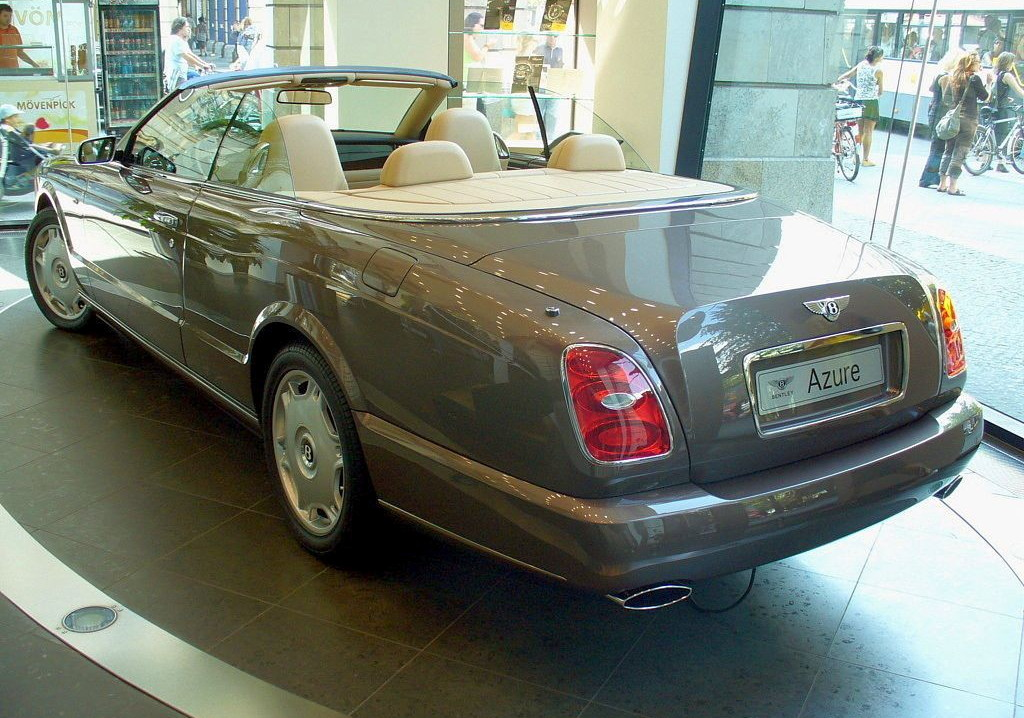
Rear view

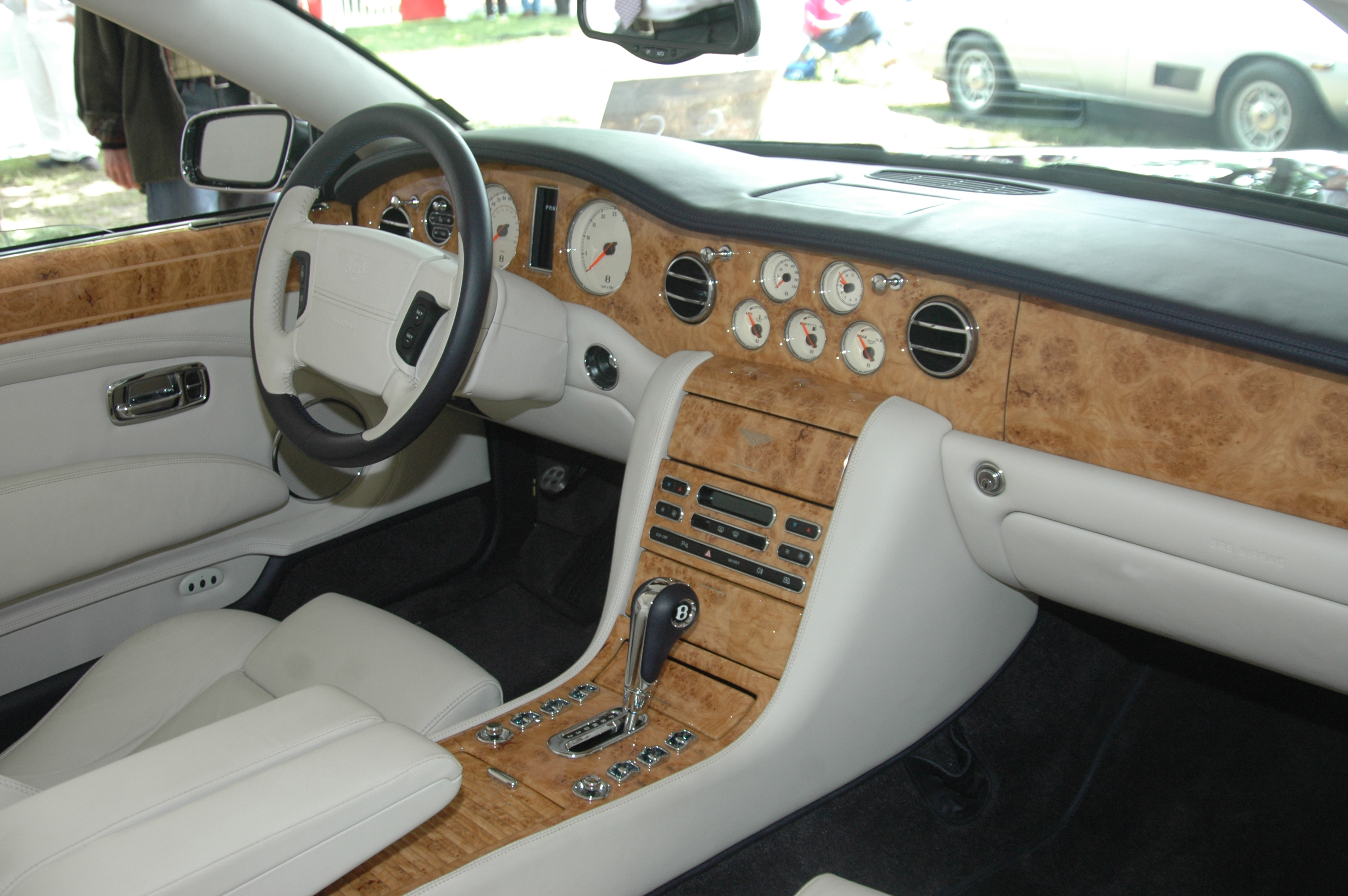
Interior

Volkswagen purchased Bentley from Vickers in 1998 when the Azure had been in production for three years. Volkswagen executives decided to keep the then-current Azure in production until 2003, then introduce its successor at a later date. Production of the new Azure began for the 2006 model year.

Now based on the Arnage platform, power came from the then-current variant of the Bentley twin-turbocharged V8 rated at 456 PS (335 kW; 450 hp) and 875 N⋅m (645 lb⋅ft) of torque. The Arnage was designed for the BMW 4.4-litre engine. However, due to the takeover battle in 1998 between BMW and Volkswagen Group for ownership of Rolls-Royce and Bentley Motors, BMW had threatened to stop supply of their engines if Volkswagen Group won. While the threat was later withdrawn in conjunction with BMW acquiring the right to manufacture Rolls-Royce automobiles at a new location, it was clear that Volkswagen could not accept the business and reputation risks associated with having their rival as a long-term business partner. Furthermore, customers were uncertain about engine and part availability. Volkswagen was thus forced to significantly re-work the "original" 6.75-liter Rolls-Royce/Bentley V8 in 2001, including a switch from the old single-turbo system to a modern twin-turbocharger setup, reducing turbo-lag and increasing horsepower output. A new, 6-speed ZF 6HP-32 automatic transmission fed power to the rear wheels.

Bentley claims a 0 to 97 km/h acceleration time of 5.6 seconds and a top speed of 270 km/h (168 mph), slightly faster than the previous model and still very good for a vehicle of this size and weight.

The United States Department of Energy lists Bentley Azure as the least fuel-efficient car in its class with only 9 miles per US gallon (26 L/100 km; 11 mpg_{‑imp}) in the city and 15 miles per US gallon (16 L/100 km; 18 mpg_{‑imp}) on the highway.

=== Azure T (2009–2010) ===
The "T" is a higher performance version of the Azure. Styling changes include 8.5J x 20-inch five-spoke, two-piece alloy wheels with 255/40 ZR20 Pirelli P Zero tyres, 'Le Mans' lower front wing air vents, dark-tinted upper and lower grilles, 'jewel' fuel filler cap (made from billet aluminium) and wing mirror mountings finished in body colour. The exterior styling was inspired by the Bentley Mark VI.

Audio system includes large display audio head unit with Secure Digital (SD) memory card slot, iPod/USB/3.5 mm AUX interface; with optional 'Naim for Bentley' 10-speaker, 1,100W audio system. Electronic Stability Programme, Tire Pressure Monitoring System are now standard equipment.

The twin-turbocharged engine was now rated 507 PS (373 kW; 500 hp) and 1,000 N⋅m (738 lb⋅ft) torque. It has a 0–97 km/h acceleration time of 5.1 seconds (0–100 km/h acceleration time of 5.5 seconds), 0–160 km/h acceleration time of 12.0 seconds and a top speed of 288 km/h (179 mph).

The Azure T was unveiled at the 2008 LA Auto Show.

=== Successor ===
The Azure had no immediate successor. However, at the 2014 Los Angeles Auto Show, Bentley unveiled a concept car built on the Mulsanne platform that followed the same formula as the two generations of the Azure that proceeded it. Bentley did not use the Azure name again with the concept, simply calling it the Grand Convertible.

The production version of the Grand Convertible was unveiled at the 2017 Dubai Motor Show. The production version was also based on the Mulsanne platform but is 99 mm (3.9 in) shorter due to the elimination of rear doors. The production version retained the wooden deck as shown on the concept car and the deck is described to be the biggest piece of wood ever applied to a production car. Mulliner, Bentley's internal coachbuilder, was tasked with the production of the Grand Convertible which was limited to 19 units only.

== Production ==
Year	Production
1995	
1996	
1997	
1998	68
1999	128
2000	131
2001	205
2002	69
2003	16
2004	-
2005	-
2006	177
2007	350
2008	165
2009	93
2010	2

== Bibliography ==
- Holmes, Mark (2007). Ultimate Convertibles: Roofless Beauty. London: Kandour. pp. 26–29. ISBN 978-1-905741-62-5.
- Hutton, Ray. "Bentley Azure". Car and Driver (June 1995): 101–102.
