= GM 4L80-E transmission =

4L80-E/4L85-E

Overview
- Manufacturer: General Motors
- Production: 1991–2009

Body and chassis
- Class: 4-speed longitudinal automatic transmission

Chronology
- Predecessor: Turbo-Hydramatic 3L80 / THM400
- Successor: 6L90

The 4L80-E (and similar 4L85-E) is a series of automatic transmissions from General Motors. Designed for longitudinal engine configurations, the series included 4 forward gears. It was the 4-speed electronically commanded evolution of the 3-speed Turbo-Hydramatic 400, first produced in October 1963. 4L80-Es were optioned only in Chevrolet/GMC pickups, vans, and commercial vehicles, and the Hummer H1. It was also adopted by Rolls-Royce in 1991 and modified after extensive testing, and used initially in the Bentley Continental R, and subsequently other Rolls-Royce and Bentley vehicles. The 4L80 and 4L85 were built at Willow Run Transmission in Ypsilanti, Michigan.

== Gear ratios ==
1	2	3	4	R
2.482	1.482	1.00	0.75	2.07

== 4L80-E ==
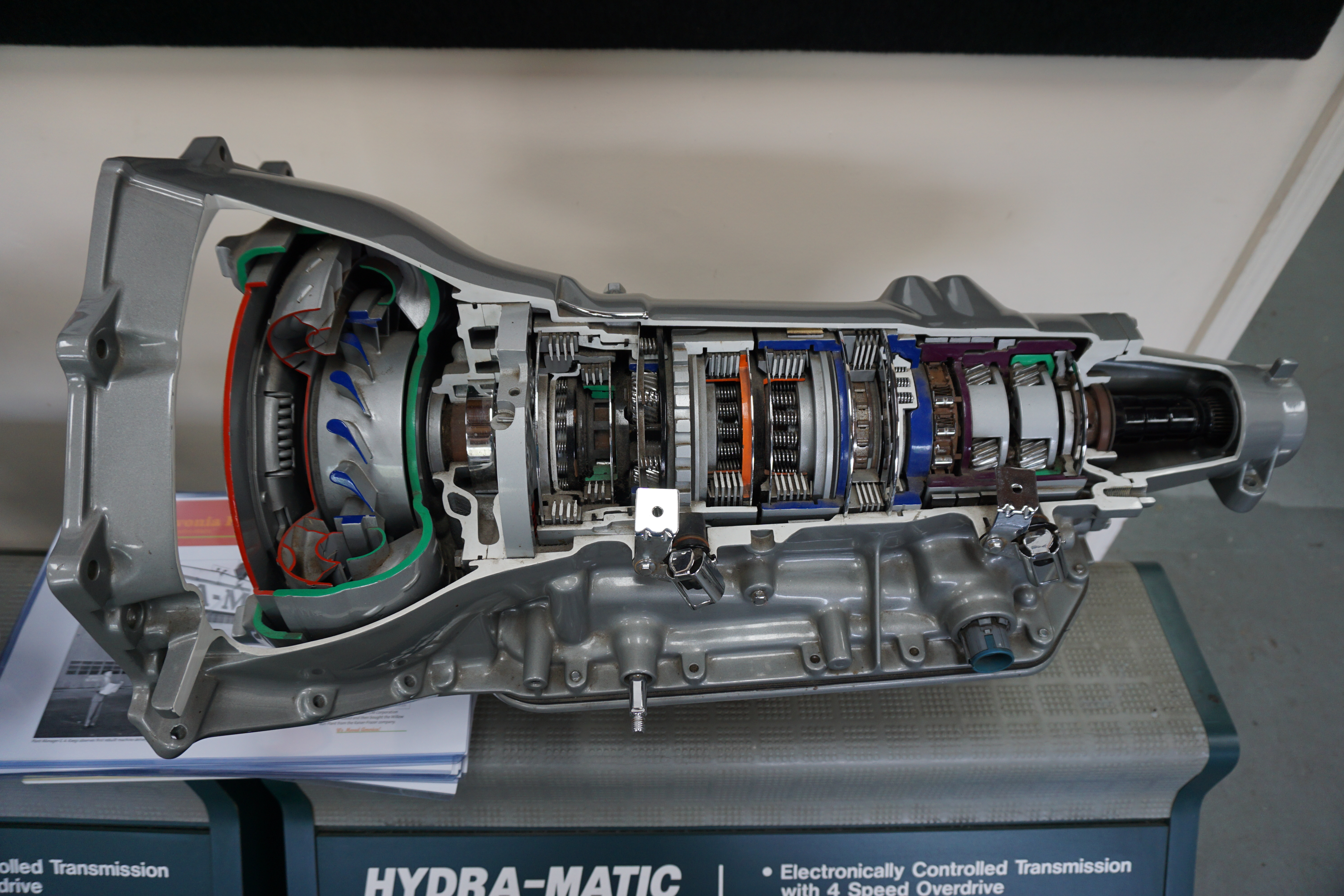
A Hydra-Matic 4L80 transmission at the Ypsilanti Automotive Heritage Museum

The 4L80-E (RPO MT1) is rated to handle engines with up to 440 ft·lbf (597 N·m) of torque. The 4L80-E is rated to a maximum GVWR of 18,000 lb, depending on the axle and vehicle.

The 4L80-E uses two shift solenoids, initially called Shift Solenoid A and Shift Solenoid B; they were later changed to comply with OBD-II regulations to 1-2 shift solenoid and 2-3 shift solenoid. By activating and deactivating the solenoids in a predetermined pattern by the PCM, four distinct gear ratios can be achieved. The shift solenoid pattern, also sometimes referred to as solenoid firing order, is as follows:

=== Shift solenoid pattern ===
	1-2 solenoid	2-3 solenoid
1st gear	on	off
2nd gear	off	off
3rd gear	off	on
4th gear	on	on

No power results in 2nd gear as "limp home mode."

=== Applications ===
- 1991–2007 Chevrolet C/K/Chevrolet Silverado/GMC Sierra 2500 and 3500
- 1991–2007 Chevrolet/GMC Suburban/GMC Yukon XL 1500 and 2500
- 1991–2009 Chevrolet Van/Chevrolet Express/GMC Savana 2500 and 3500
- 1995–1999 Chevrolet Tahoe/GMC Yukon 6.5L Diesel
- 2002–2006 Chevrolet Avalanche 2500
- 1992–2006 Hummer H1
- 1992–1998 Rolls-Royce Silver Spirit/Spur II, III, IV
- 1991–1992 Bentley Eight
- 1991–1997 Bentley Turbo R
- 1991–2002 Bentley Continental R/S/T
- 1999–2006 Bentley Arnage Red Label / Bentley Arnage R/RL/T
- 1993–1996 Jaguar XJS V12
- 1994–1997 Jaguar XJR
- 1993–1997 Jaguar XJ12 / Daimler Double Six
- 1996–1999 Aston Martin DB7

== 4L85-E ==
The 4L85-E (RPO MN8) is rated to handle engines with up to 690 ft·lbf (935 N·m) of torque. The 4L85E is rated to handle vehicles with a GVWR of up to 18,000 lbs (dependent on axle ratio and vehicle)

Applications:

- 2002–2006 Chevrolet Avalanche 2500
- 2001–2006 Chevrolet Suburban / GMC Yukon XL (8.1L Vortec only)
- Chevrolet Express / GMC Savana with Duramax Diesel or 8.1L Vortec
- Rally Fighter

== See also ==
- List of GM transmissions
