= Bentley Mulsanne =

Bentley Mulsanne may refer to two distinct automobiles manufactured by Bentley:

- Bentley Mulsanne (1980–1992), a luxury car produced by Bentley Motors from 1980 until 1992
- Bentley Mulsanne (2010), a luxury car produced by Bentley Motors from 2010 until 2020
