= Bentley Eight =

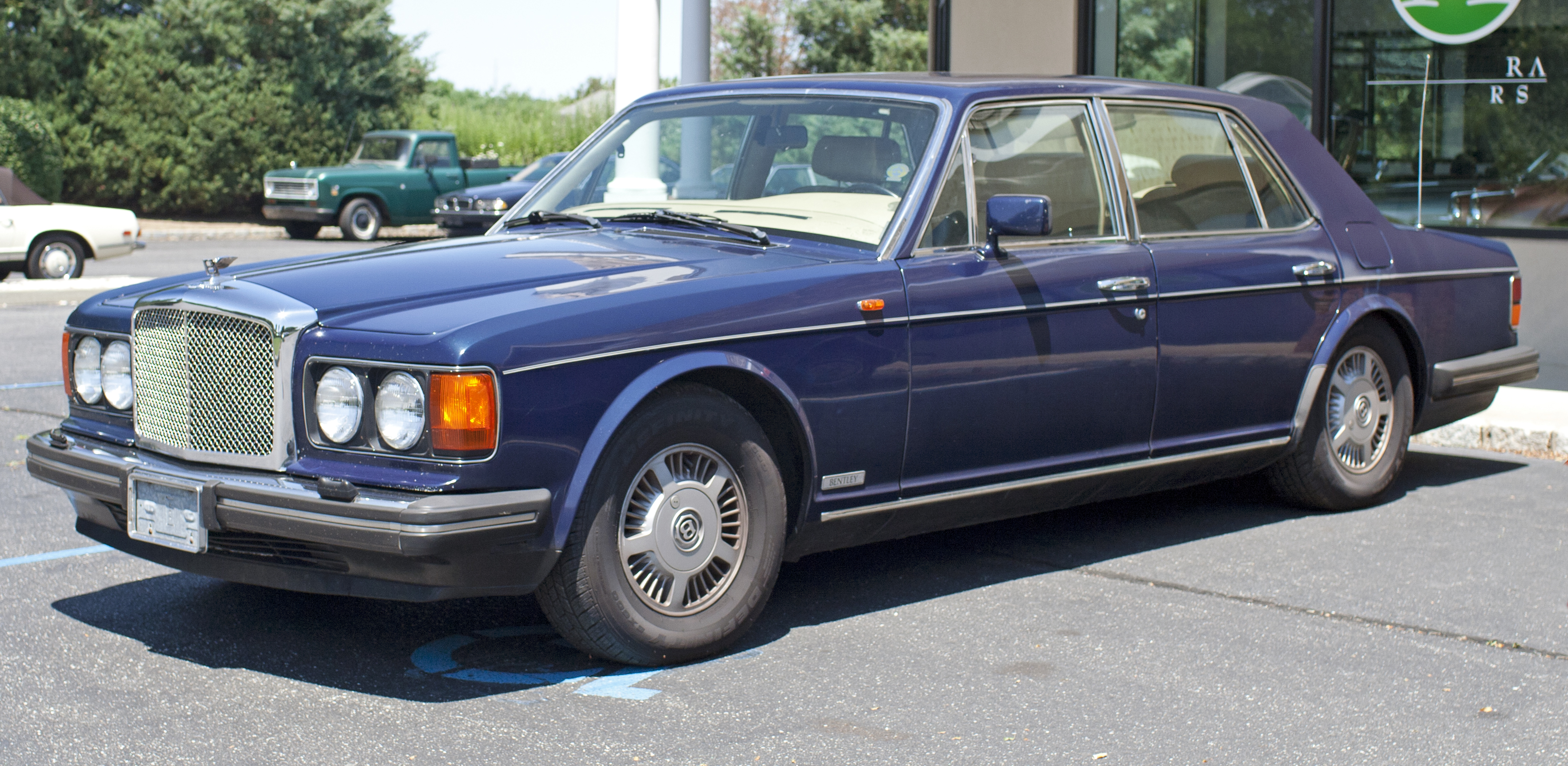

Overview
- Manufacturer: Bentley
- Production: 1984–1992; 1,736 produced
- Assembly: United Kingdom: Crewe (Bentley Crewe)

Body and chassis
- Class: Full-size luxury car
- Body style: 4-door saloon
- Layout: FR layout
- Related: Bentley Mulsanne; Rolls-Royce Silver Spirit

Powertrain
- Engine: 6.75 L (411.9 cu in) Rolls-Royce V8
- Transmission: 4-sp 4L80-E automatic

Dimensions
- Wheelbase: 3,061 mm (120.5 in)
- Length: 5,310 mm (209.1 in)
- Width: 1,890 mm (74.4 in)
- Height: 1,490 mm (58.7 in)
- Kerb weight: 2,320.2 kg (5,115 lb)

Chronology
- Predecessor: none
- Successor: none Bentley Brooklands (successor of Mulsanne S); Bentley Flying Spur (later, much cheaper)

The Bentley Eight was Bentley's "entry-level" offering from 1984 until 1992. Distinguished mainly by a wire-mesh grille radiator instead of vertical slats, the Eight also had somewhat less equipment than the similar Mulsanne on which it was based. This brought the introductory price to under the psychologically important £50,000 mark at the time of introduction, £6,000 less than the Mulsanne. A firmer suspension offered slight handling improvements. The Eight was so popular that sales expanded from the original UK market to Europe and the United States.

== Model specification ==
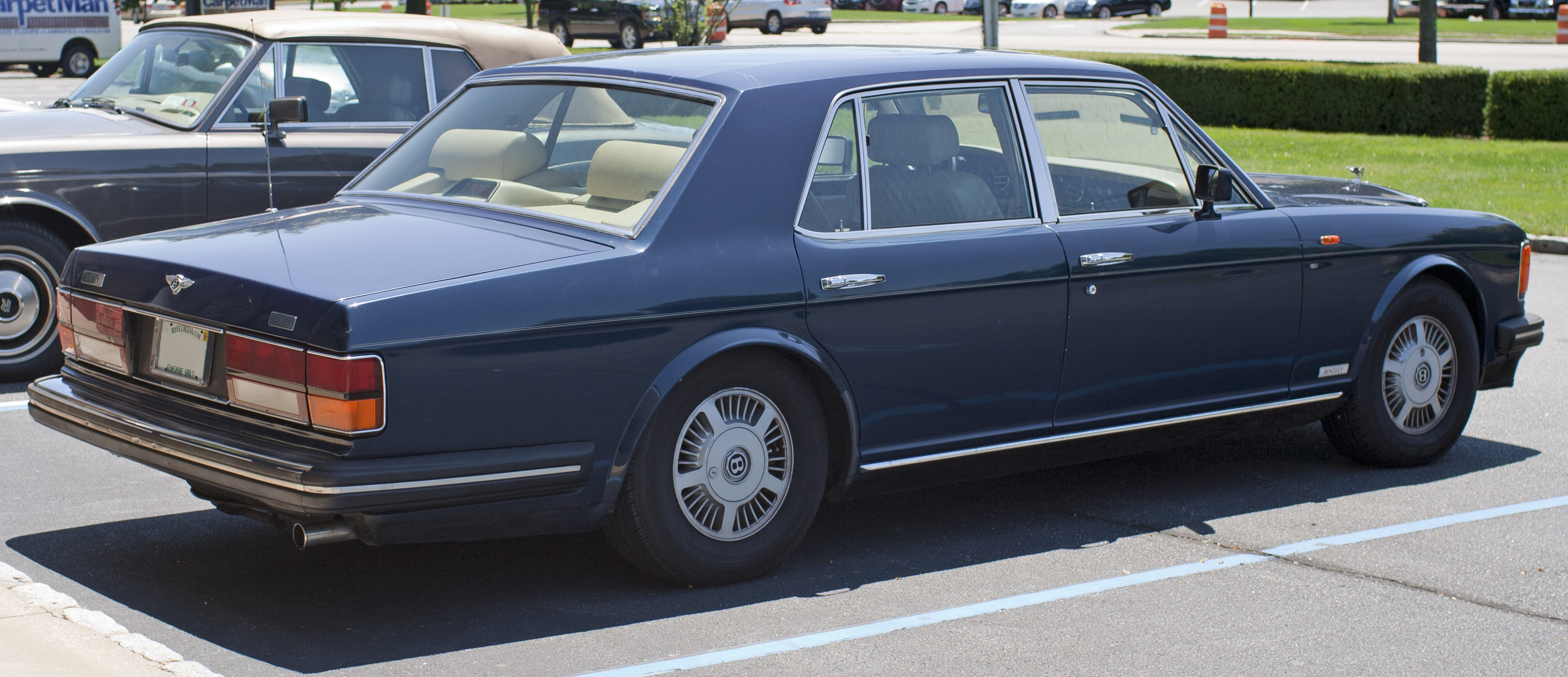
1989 Bentley Eight

The Eight was introduced with cloth upholstery, steel wheels, and a mesh grille that was simpler than the slatted grille of the Mulsanne. Fuel injection and anti-lock brakes were added in 1986, leather upholstery and power memory seats were added in 1987, and automatic ride height adjustment was added in 1990. In Britain, catalytic converters became optional in 1990 – although they had been available long before in markets where such were required. The three-speed automatic transmission was replaced by a four-speed transmission in August 1992.
