= BMW Goldfisch V16 =

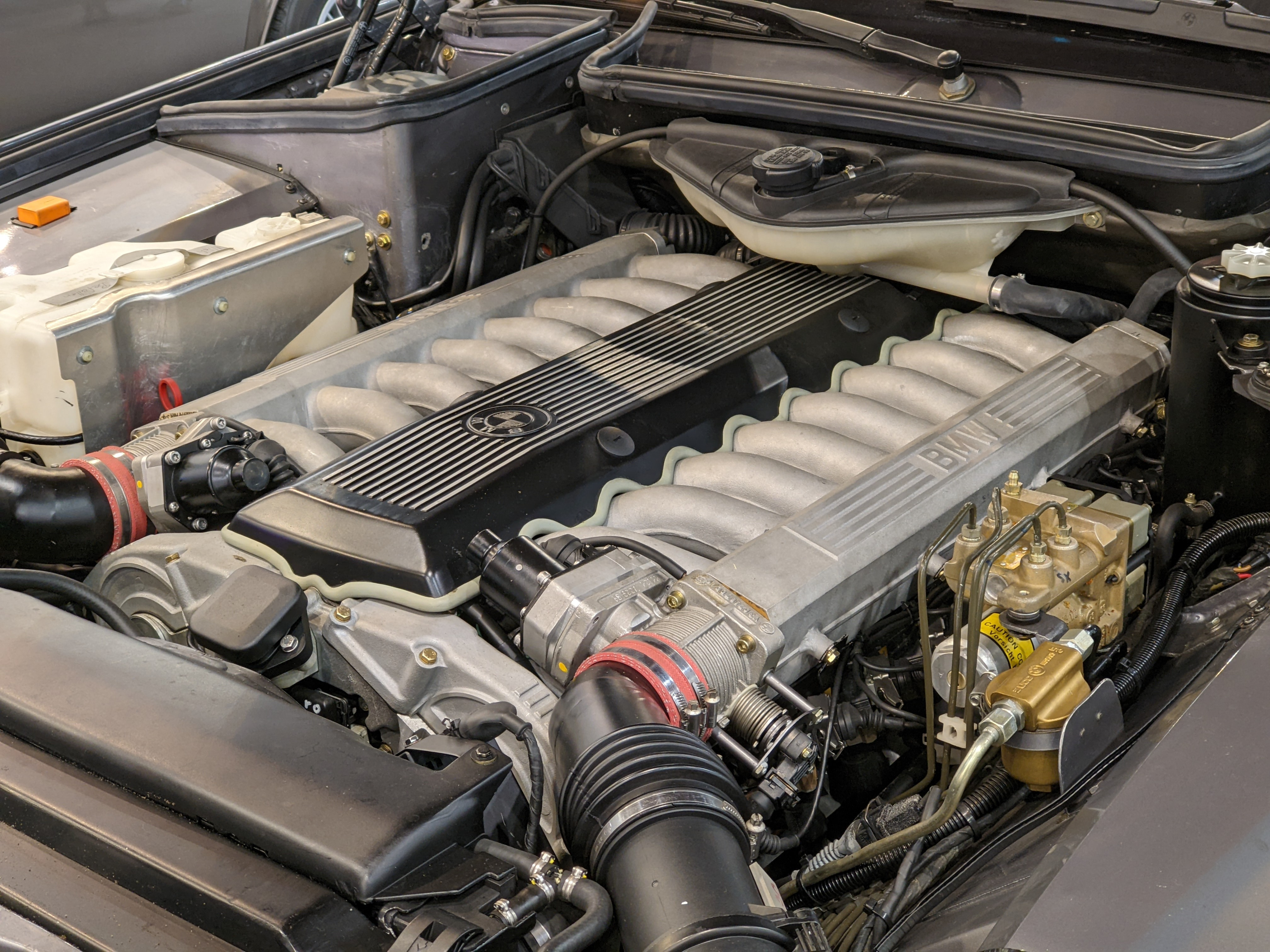

Overview
- Manufacturer: BMW
- Also called: BMW V16
- Production: 1987

Layout
- Configuration: 60° V16
- Displacement: 6,651 cc (405.9 cu in)
- Cylinder bore: 84 mm (3.31 in)
- Piston stroke: 75 mm (2.95 in)
- Cylinder block material: Aluminium
- Cylinder head material: Aluminium
- Valvetrain: SOHC
- Compression ratio: 8.8:1

Combustion
- Fuel type: Gasoline

Output
- Power output: 408 PS (300 kW)
- Torque output: 62.5 kp·m (613 N·m) (Note: According to Karlheinz Lange, one of the engineers who worked on this engine, the maximum torque is 63.7 kp·m (625 N·m).)

Dimensions
- Dry weight: 310 kg (683 lb)

The BMW Goldfisch is a SOHC 32-valve V16 6.7-litre prototype automotive piston engine based on the BMW M70 V12 engine.

== Development ==
Development started in the late 1980s. The engine was built to demonstrate the maximum potential of the small cylinder displacement engine family. Also, a three-cylinder model of the same engine family was made to set a minimum. Development started on July 8, 1987, and by the beginning of 1988 the engine was ready. It was put on a dynamometer in January and February 1988. Afterwards, it was installed in a modified long wheelbase BMW 7 Series (E32), and the first driving tests were made in May 1988. On July 7, 1988, the engine was presented internally within BMW.

To prevent an "arms race" with other engine manufacturers, the V16 was never put into mass production. Additionally, a higher-performance version of the M70 engine, the S70B56 installed in the BMW 850CSi, produced 380 PS (279 kW) and 56.1 kp⋅m (550 N⋅m; 406 lb⋅ft) of torque, almost reaching the power output of the V16.

This engine was also trialled in the Bentley Mulsanne as a potential "upgrade" from a turbocharged V8 engine. Unlike the 7 Series, the engine fit in the bay with room for radiator and ancillaries.

== Specifications ==
The engine design virtually copies the BMW M70 V12 layout, keeping that engine's cylinder dimensions, but with four more cylinders added.

- 6,651 cc 60°-V16 engine
- Cast aluminium block and cylinder heads
- SOHC, 2 valves per cylinder
- Bore and stroke: 84 × 75 mm (3.3 × 3.0 in)
- Bore spacing: 91 mm (3.6 in)
- Compression ratio: 8.8:1
- Maximum power: 408 PS (300 kW) at 5,200 rpm
- Maximum torque: 62.5 kp⋅m (613 N⋅m; 452 lb⋅ft) at 3,900 rpm
- Redline: 6,000 rpm
- Engine management: Two separate Bosch DME 3.3 for each bank
- Dry weight: 310 kg (683 lb)

== See also ==
- List of BMW engines
