= Bentley Turbo R =

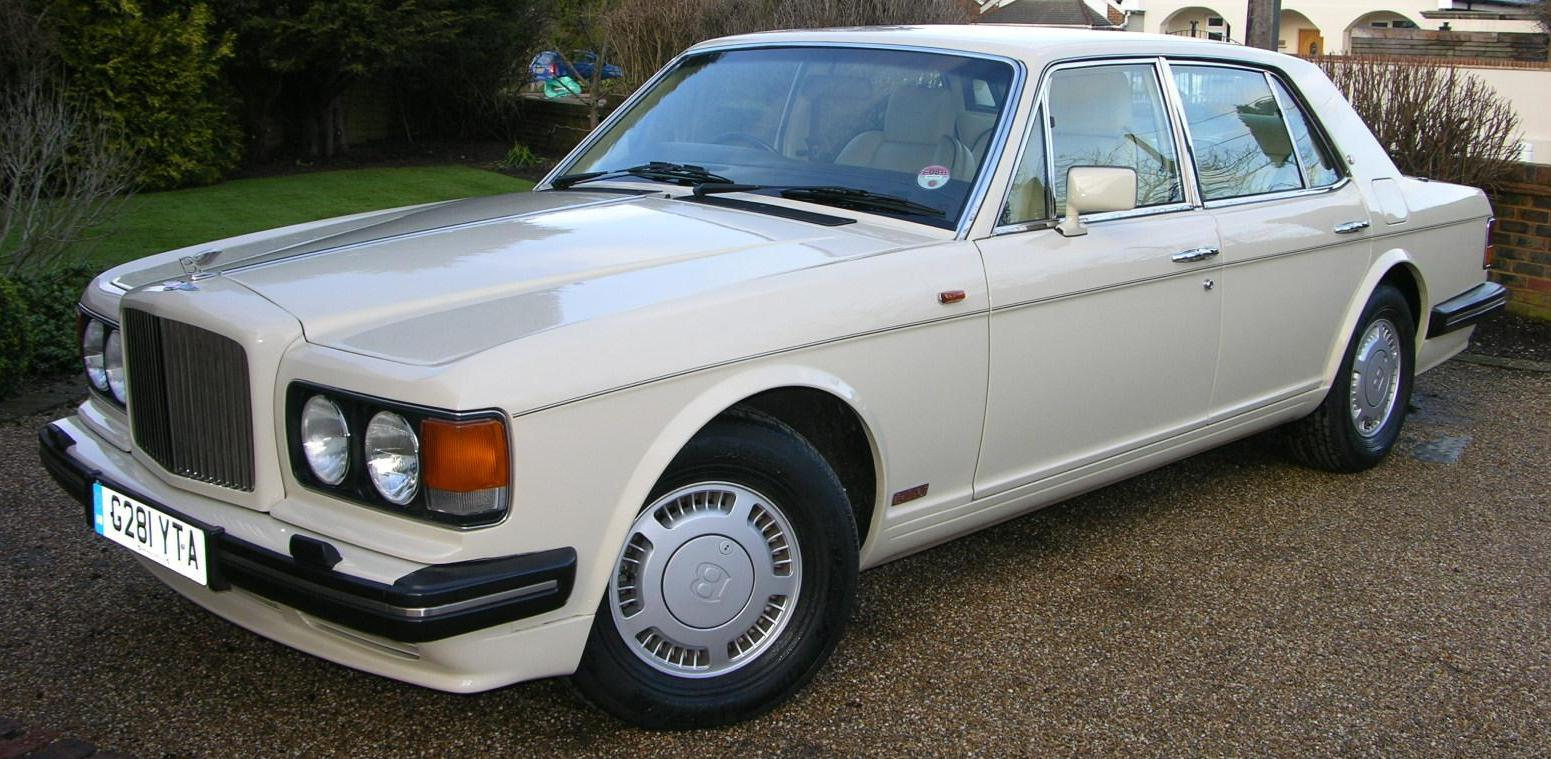

Overview
- Manufacturer: Bentley
- Production: Turbo R:1985–1997; 7,230 produced; Turbo RT: 1997–1999; 252 produced
- Assembly: United Kingdom: Crewe (Bentley Crewe)
- Designer: Steve Harper

Body and chassis
- Class: Full-size luxury car
- Body style: 4-door saloon
- Layout: FR layout
- Related: Rolls-Royce Silver Spirit

Powertrain
- Engine: 6.75 L turbo Bentley V8
- Transmission: 3-speed TH400 automatic 4-speed 4L80-E automatic

Dimensions
- Wheelbase: 1985–1994 R: 120.5 in (3,061 mm); 1985–1994 RL, 1995–1997 R: 124.5 in (3,162 mm)
- Length: 1985–1992 R: 207.8 in (5,278 mm); 1993–1994 R: 207.4 in (5,268 mm); 1985–1992 Turbo RL: 211.4 in (5,370 mm); 1993–1994 Turbo RL: 211.8 in (5,380 mm); 1995–1997 R: 212.4 in (5,395 mm)
- Width: 74.4 in (1,890 mm)
- Height: 58.5 in (1,486 mm)
- Kerb weight: 5,400 lb (2,450 kg)

Chronology
- Predecessor: Bentley Mulsanne Turbo
- Successor: Bentley Arnage

The Bentley Turbo R is a high-performance automobile which was produced by Bentley Motors Limited from 1985 to 1999. The "R" stood for "roadholding", to set it apart from its predecessor. It initially inherited the turbocharged engine from the Mulsanne Turbo and also sported a retuned suspension and wider tyres on aluminium alloy wheels, a first for a Bentley. From the 1987 model year (20,000 series chassis numbers), however, the Turbo R's V8 engine was retuned with fuel injection for added torque. Motor Trend called the Turbo R "the first Bentley in decades deserving of the famous name" in their review of the car on its introduction to the United States in 1989.

== History ==
The suspension changes, though seemingly subtle, transformed the soft and less than well-controlled ride of the Mulsanne Turbo into that of a real performer. Development on improving handling had already begun when Mike Dunn was appointed engineering director in Crewe in February 1983, but instead of the proposed ten per cent increase in roll stiffness, he demanded 50%. This goal was met by upping the anti-roll bar rates by 100 per cent in front and 60 per cent in the rear, and by increasing the damping. A panhard rod to anchor the rear sub-frame was also introduced, reducing side-to-side movement in corners. Spring rates remained the same as on the Mulsanne.

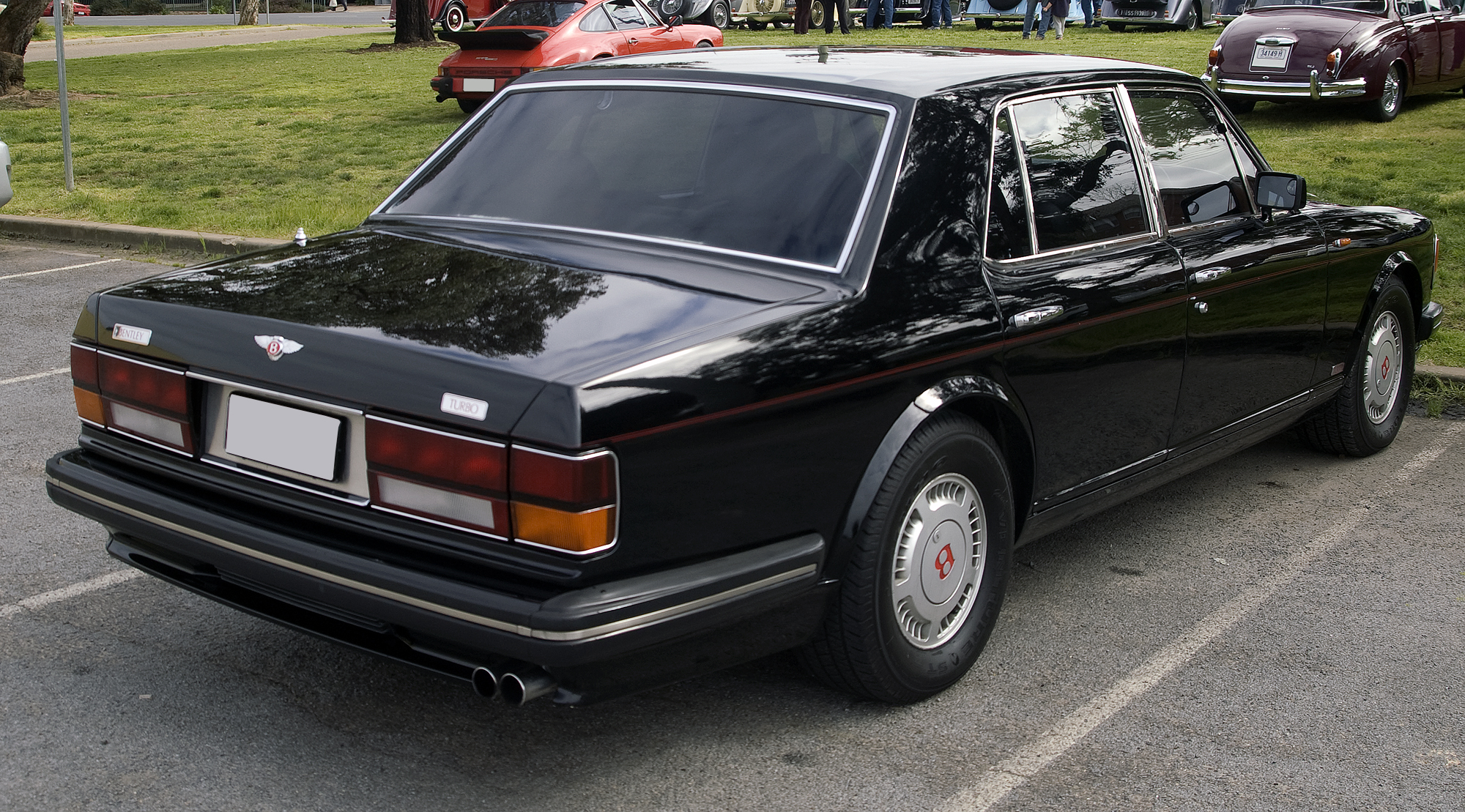
Bentley Turbo R, rear view

Although official figures were never provided by Rolls-Royce, period estimates were for power output at 296 hp (221 kW; 300 PS) with 660 N⋅m (487 lb⋅ft) of torque. Priced at US$195,000 in the US market, the Turbo R slotted above the Bentley Mulsanne S and Rolls-Royce Silver Spirit but $39,000 below the Rolls-Royce Silver Spur.

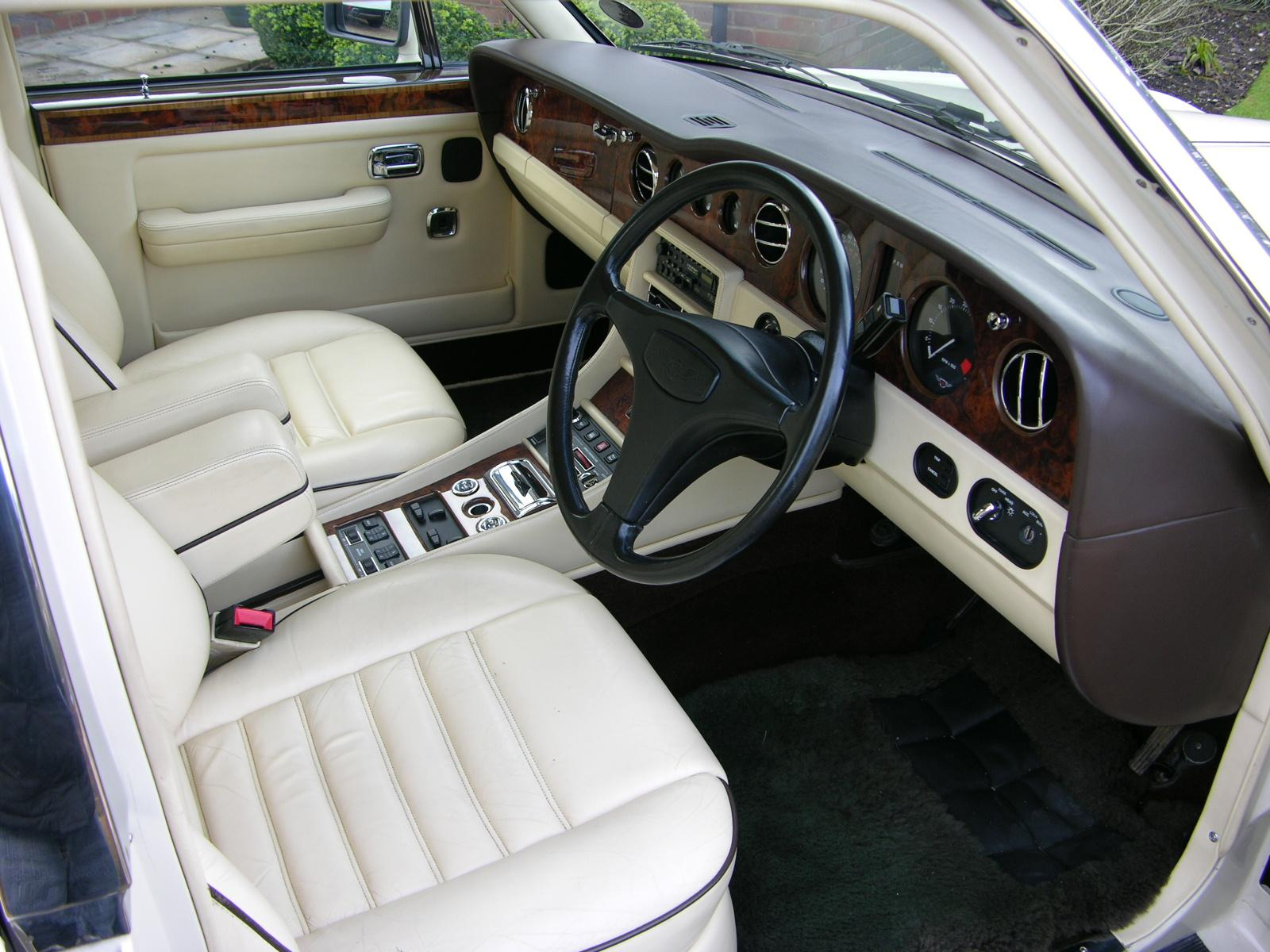
Bentley Turbo R Interior

Bentley had intended to keep the Mulsanne Turbo in production alongside the Turbo R, and they did for a brief moment, but the Mulsanne was taken out of production in 1985 as demand dropped precipitously in favor of the new model. In October 1986, for the 1987 model year, the Turbo R received anti-lock brakes and new Bosch MK-Motronic fuel injection to replace the Solex carburetors. Other modifications carried out at the same time included new, slimmer sports seats and a higher rear axle ratio. In mid-1988 (MY 1989) changes to the appearance were made, introducing twin round headlamps and a bigger front spoiler. Around the turn of the year between 1991 and 1992, GM's 4L80-E four-speed automatic transmission replaced the long running three-speed Turbo Hydramatic 400 throughout the Bentley/Rolls-Royce lineup, including the Turbo R.

=== New Turbo R ===
A "New" Turbo R model was introduced in 1995 for the 1996 model year. Changes included Zytek fuel injection and appearance modifications. There was also a special version for the German market, the "Turbo R Sport", which featured the Continental T's sporty alloys and carbon-fibre, rather than walnut, panels inside.

=== Turbo S ===
In 1995, the Bentley Turbo S was announced as a strictly limited model, with envisaged production as fewer than 100 units. Effectively a stop-gap model before the introduction of the New Turbo R, just 60 units were produced, making it the rarest of the Bentley SZ Series of cars. The cars were sold across selected European, Middle Eastern and Asian markets only, as it was never legalized for sale in North America. The engine termed a Blackpool version used Bosch Motronic fuel injection and digital ignition derived from Formula 1 technology, and with a larger exhaust driven Garrett AirResearch turbocharger with intercooler. It had a power output of 408 hp (304 kW; 414 PS). The Blackpool engine was also fitted to twelve Bentley Continental S, and to three special build Rolls-Royce Silver Spirit S. The car was fitted with a viscous differential, and with both new 255/55WR17 tyres and traction control fitted, permitted a top speed of 155 mph (250 km/h).

In 1996 production of the short wheelbase Turbo R ended, leaving only the model hitherto sold as the Turbo RL - now known simply as the Turbo R. For 1998, the Turbo R was replaced by the sportier yet Turbo RT.

== Turbo RT ==
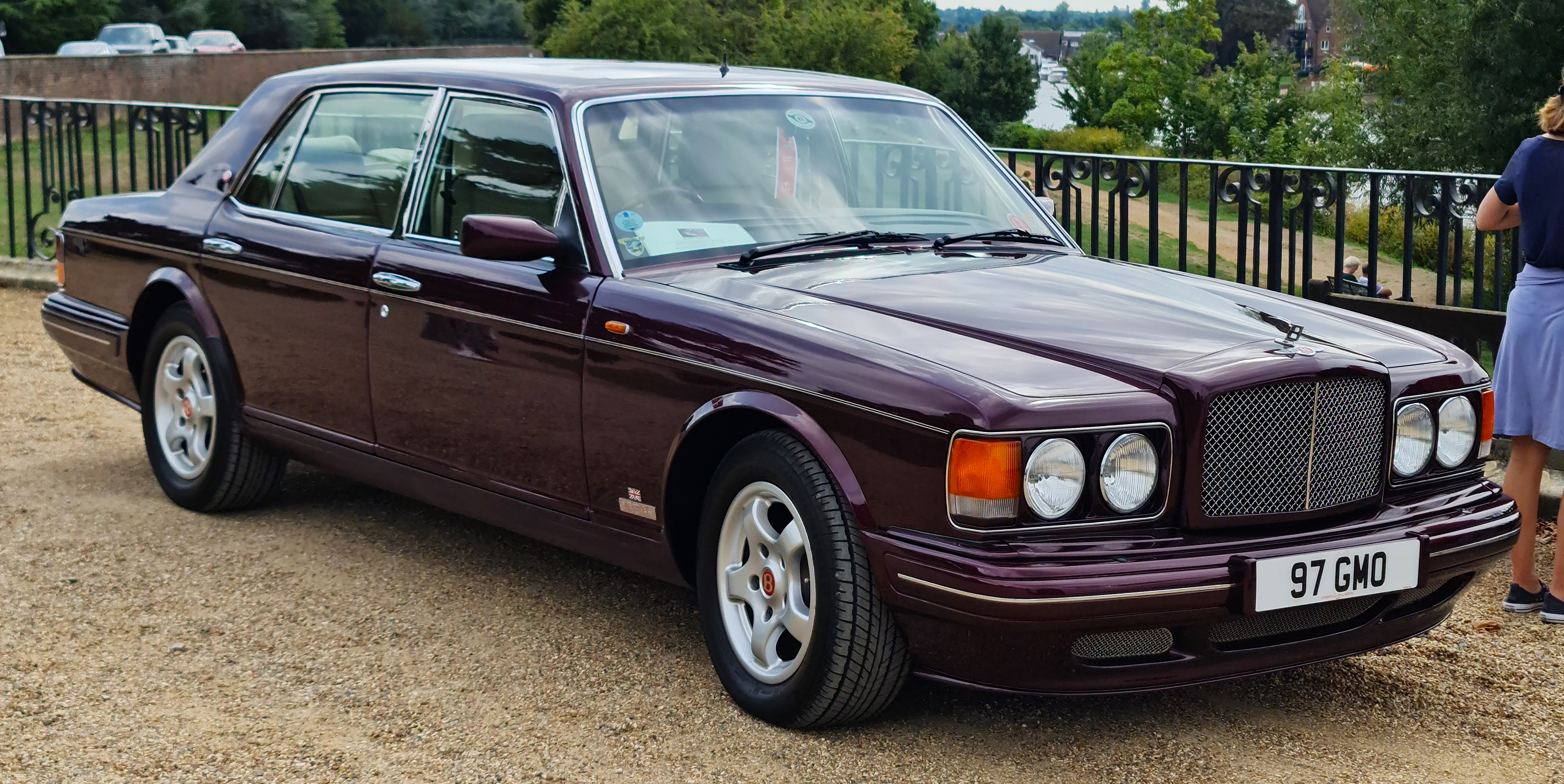
1998 Bentley Turbo RT

The Bentley Turbo RT was the last and most expensive of the Turbo R line. The Bentley RT came with a 400 bhp (298 kW; 406 PS) version of the 6.75 L V8 engine, as used in the Continental T, which is boosted by a single Garrett AiResearch T04 turbocharger and has a Zytek EMS3 engine management system. This was developed using Formula 1 racing technology, differing from earlier models with the 'Motronic' system. The RT is visually differentiated from other Bentley Turbo R models by its sport wheels, radiator mesh grille and colour-coded bumpers with bright mesh inserts. Performance was sufficient: with a top speed limited to 150 mph (241 km/h), the ultra-luxurious Turbo RT was as fast as the sporting German luxury saloons of the time. The car's base price was US$211,600, or roughly US$65,000 more than the Turbo R.

The Turbo RT was produced during 1997 and 1998 only, with 252 units produced. It was essentially a "runout special", an effort to sell off the last SZ-style bodies before the introduction of the Arnage. A few even rarer editions of the RT were made:

The Bentley Turbo RT Olympian: in 1998, London dealer Jack Barclay agreed to have a small number of cars built to incorporate many special features. These are probably the rarest version of the RT - although not officially recognised as such, therefore the RT Mulliner commands a much higher premium. These were sold as the Bentley Turbo RT Olympian. They can be identified by the five-spoke alloy wheels (borrowed from the 'Mulliner' version) and the "Olympian" boot badge. It is estimated that only four examples of this version were ever built.

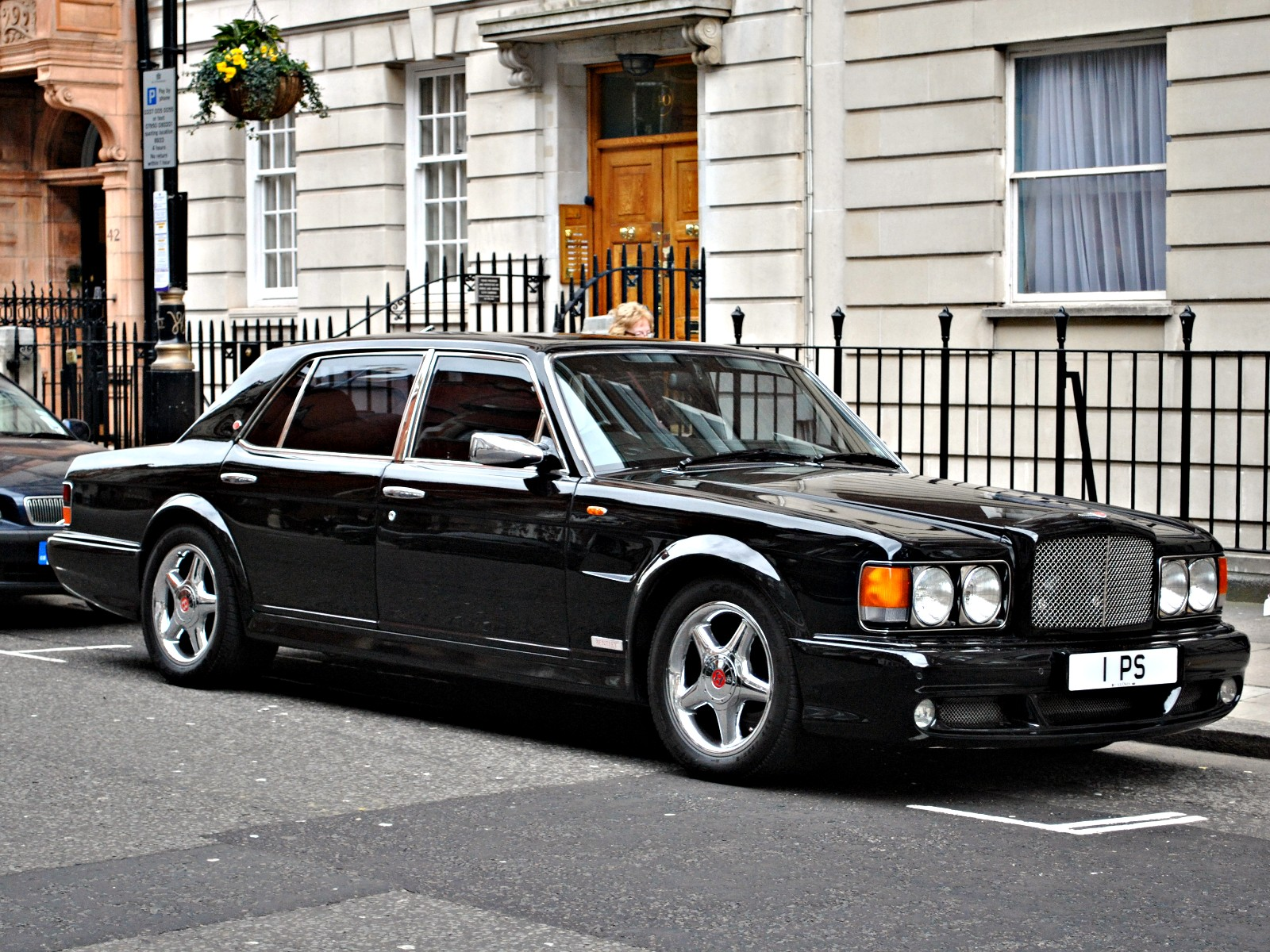
One of 56 Bentley Turbo RT Mulliner

The Bentley Turbo RT Mulliner: The Mulliner version, available only by special order for the 1998 model year, was even more exclusive and expensive. It has a 420 bhp (313 kW; 426 PS) engine with a torque output of 634 lb⋅ft (860 N⋅m): this was achieved by developing a new compressor for the turbocharger, remapping the engine management system, and modifying the air intake system. Visually, Mulliners have more aerodynamic, rounded bumpers with prominent venting and often foglamps, as well as flared wings to accommodate the wider track and larger 18-inch alloy wheels, sitting on low-profile 255/55 tyres. Each car was built to individual specifications, with many sporting side and bonnet vents and also the smaller Mulliner rear windscreen. One popular feature in Mulliners is a prominent speedometer for the rear passengers.

Just 56 Mulliner editions were built (all in 1998), of which 17 are right-hand drive. Seven of the Mulliner editions built are to standard wheelbase specifications, and 49 are on the lengthened wheelbase.

== Production ==
- Original Turbo R: 5864
  - Short wheelbase: 4653
  - Long wheelbase: 1211
- New Turbo R: 1366
  - Short wheelbase: 543
  - Long wheelbase: 823
- Turbo RT: 252
  - Olympian: 4
  - Mulliner Edition SWB: 7
  - Mulliner Edition LWB: 49
