= Bentley Mulsanne (1980–1992) =

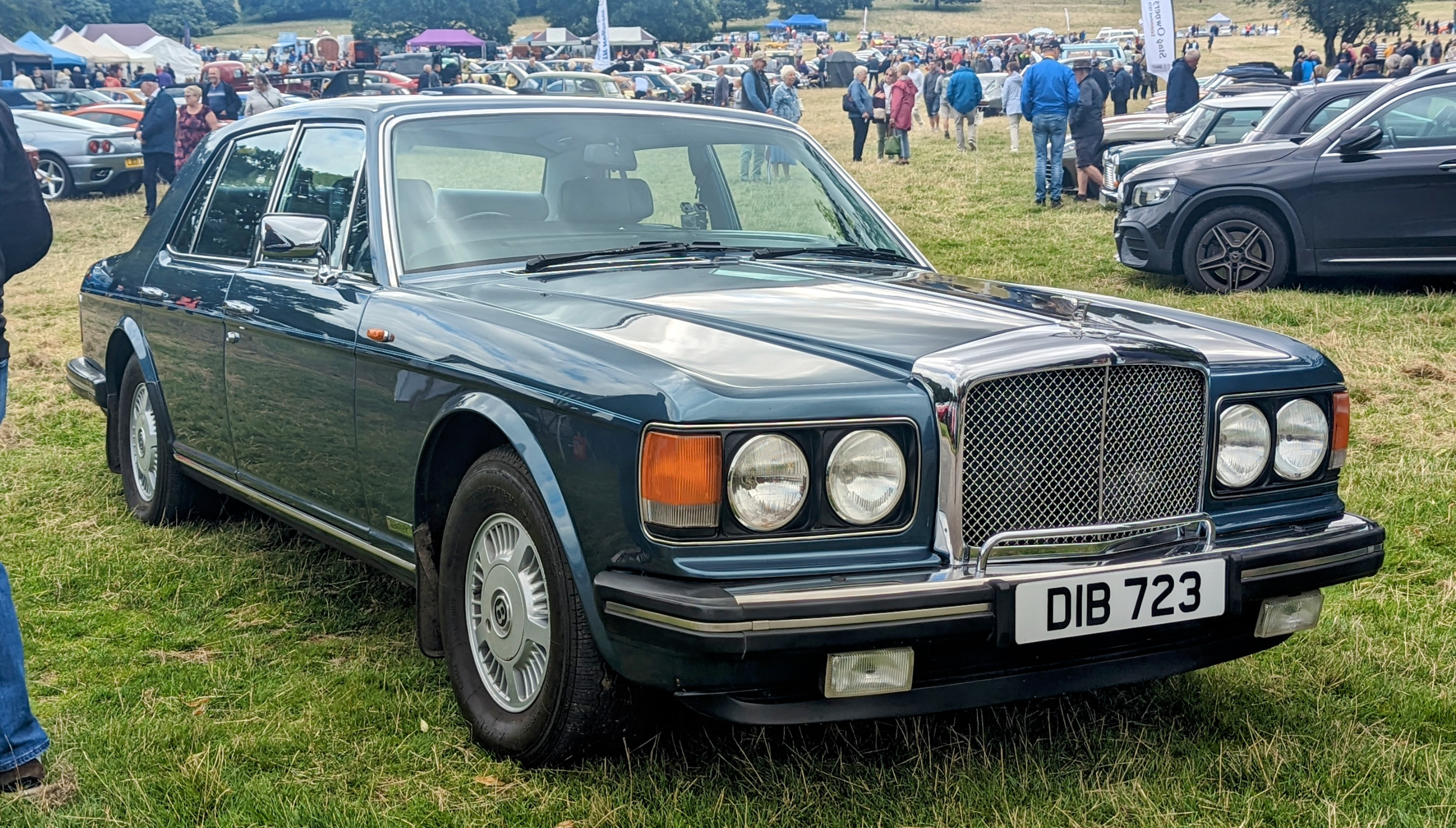

Overview
- Manufacturer: Bentley
- Production: 1980–1992; 2,019 produced
- Assembly: United Kingdom: Crewe (Bentley Crewe)

Body and chassis
- Class: Full-size luxury car
- Body style: 4-door saloon
- Layout: FR layout
- Related: Bentley Eight; Rolls-Royce Silver Spirit; Rolls-Royce Silver Spur

Powertrain
- Engine: 6.75 L Bentley V8; 6.75 L turbo Bentley V8 (1982–1985)
- Transmission: 3-speed THM 400 automatic

Dimensions
- Wheelbase: 3,061 mm (120.5 in); 3,162 mm (124.5 in)

Chronology
- Predecessor: Bentley T2
- Successor: Bentley Brooklands (Mulsanne S); Bentley Turbo R (Mulsanne Turbo)

The Bentley Mulsanne is a large (performance) luxury saloon produced by Bentley Motors from 1980 until 1992, though derivative models including the Continental T and Azure continued in production into the 2000s.

Contrary to its predecessors, the Bentley Mulsanne was given an actual name instead of a letter, but otherwise started as another standard rebadged Rolls-Royce, the Silver Spirit. However, with the launch of the 'Brooklands' version, and the 1982 Mulsanne Turbo – with 50 percent more horsepower – the Mulsanne began the rebuild of an appealing individual Bentley brand image.

== Name ==
The Mulsanne was named after the Mulsanne straight, a section at the Circuit de la Sarthe in which refers to the Bentley's success at the 24 Hours of Le Mans between 1924 and 1930.

== Models ==
=== Mulsanne ===
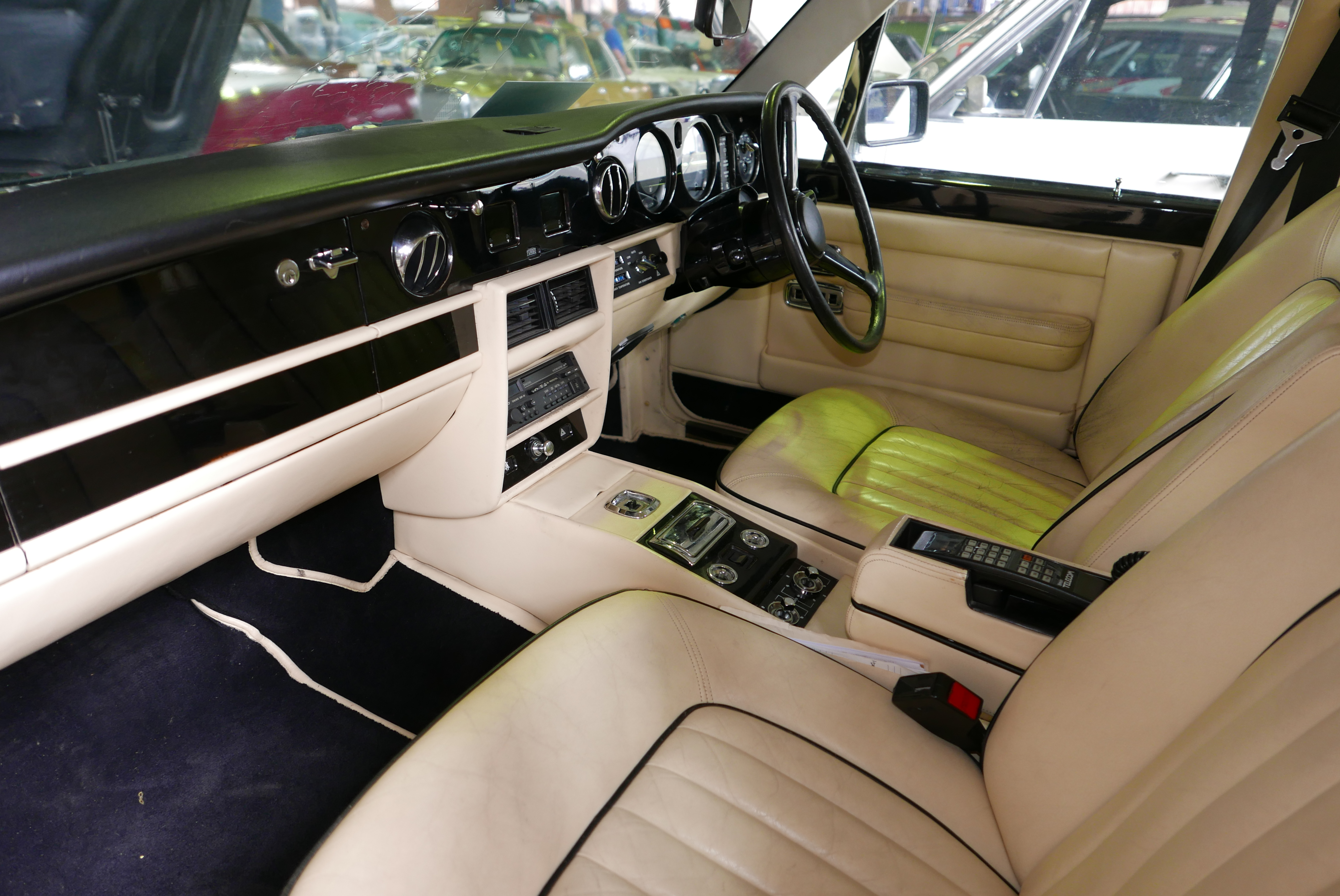
1985 Bentley Mulsanne Turbo interior

In 1980, the Rolls-Royce Silver Shadow and the Bentley T-series were replaced by the RR Silver Spirit and, as with prior models, a Bentley-badged equivalent. This time however, it was given a name: the "Mulsanne". This was derived from Bentley's motorsport history, which included five victories at the 24 Hours of Le Mans between 1924 and 1930. The 'Mulsanne Straight' is the stretch of Le Mans' race-course where cars reach their highest speeds.

The Mulsanne initially shared the same carburetted 6 3/4-litre (6,750 cc; 412 cu in) Rolls-Royce V8 engine with aluminium alloy cylinder heads with the Silver Spirit, carried over from the Silver Shadow II and Bentley T2. In 1982 however, a turbocharged version with much more power and torque was also introduced – for Bentley only – in the Mulsanne Turbo.

From 1986, the two SU carburettors were replaced by Bosch fuel injection on all cars. All Mulsannes use a 3-speed automatic transmission.

=== Mulsanne Turbo ===
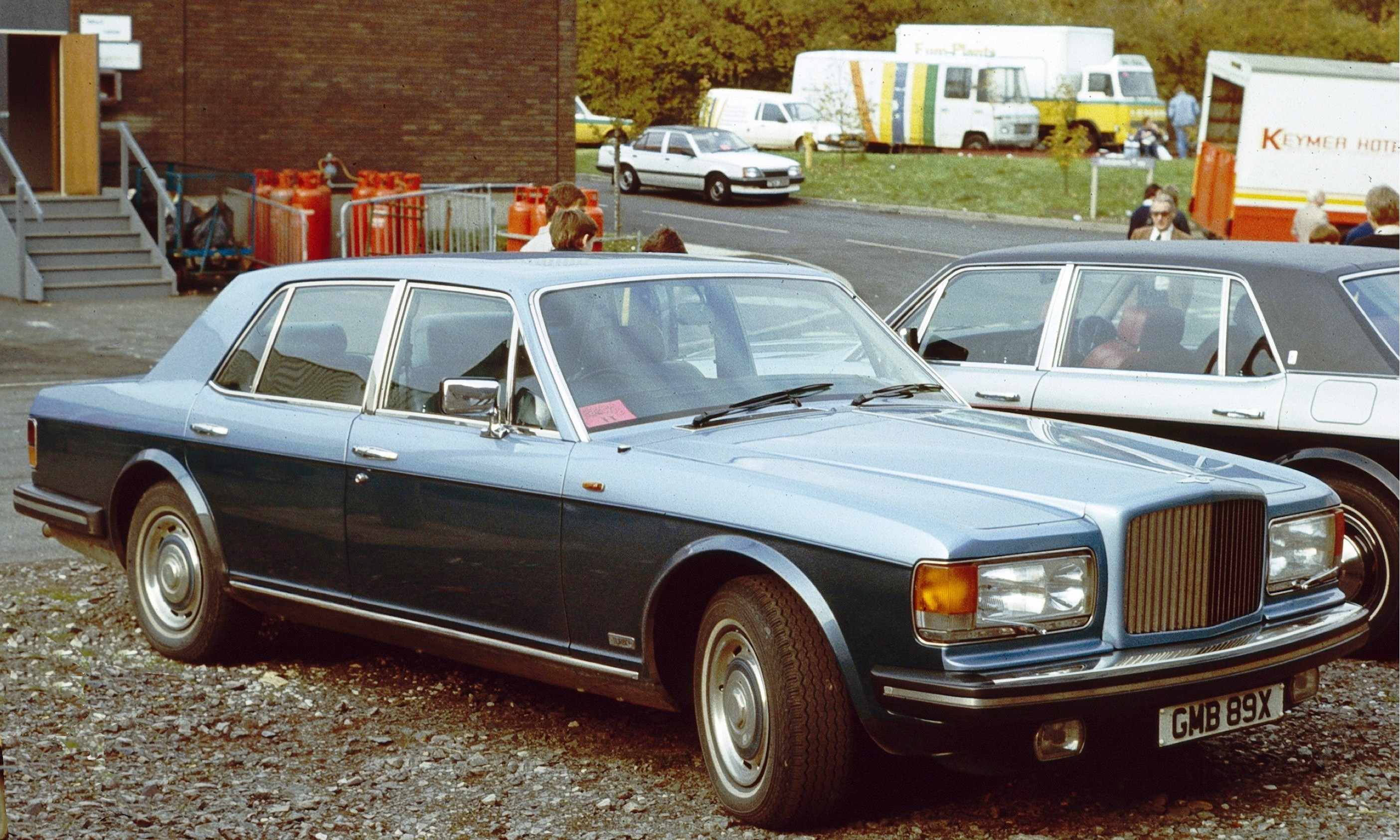
Bentley Mulsanne Turbo (1984)

The Mulsanne Turbo was launched at the Geneva Motor Show in 1982 and produced until 1985. A Garrett AiResearch turbocharger provided a 50% increase in engine power – something not seen on a Bentley in half a century. The interior sported the usual highly polished, walnut veneered fascia, blemish-free leather upholstery, and pure wool for the carpets and headlining.

A total of 498 standard wheelbase and 18 long-wheelbase Mulsanne Turbos were built, until they were replaced by the Bentley Turbo R in 1985, which used a fuel injected version of the same 6 3/4 litre V8 engine since 1987.

A British racing green Turbo has been used in the two James Bond novels Role of Honour and Nobody Lives for Ever by John Gardner.

=== Mulsanne S ===
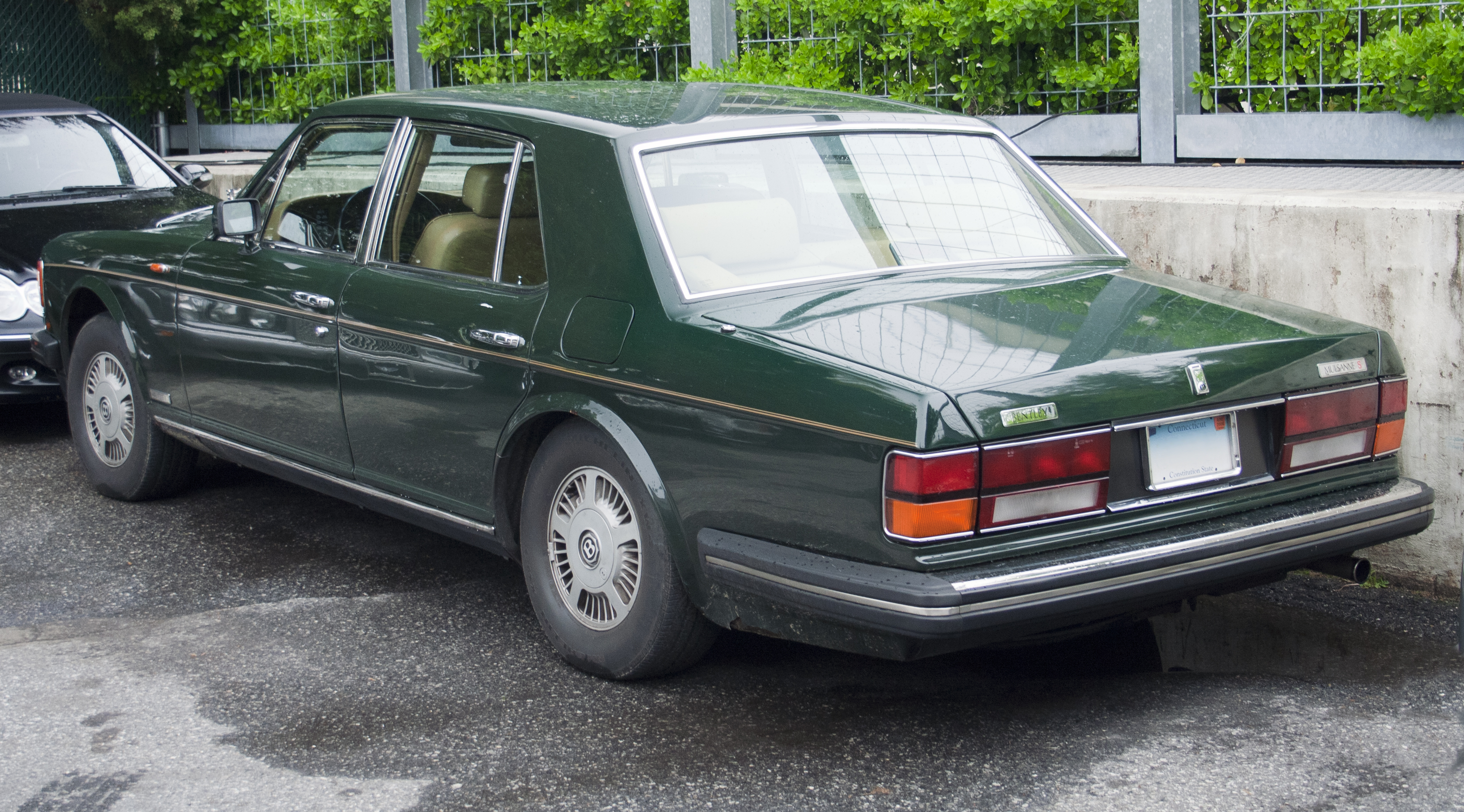
Bentley Mulsanne S

The Mulsanne S was introduced in 1987. Although this model lacked its turbocharger, many of its other details were similar to the Turbo R, including that car's alloy wheels and interior, and the suspension was firmed up for a more sporting ride. The rectangular headlamps from the 1980s gave way to quad round units for 1989, and the model was produced until 1992.

=== Mulsanne V16 ===
The BMW Goldfisch V16 engine was tested in the Bentley Mulsanne as a potential "upgrade" from the turbocharged V8 engine. Unlike the BMW 7 Series, the engine fit in the bay with room for radiator and ancillaries but it was never sold to the public.

== Derivative models ==
The Mulsanne was based on the Rolls-Royce Silver Spirit/Silver Spur introduced at the same time. It would be the basis for all Bentley models until the 1998 introduction of the Arnage.

== Specifications ==
| Model | Engine & Displacement | Horsepower | Torque | 0-100 km/h (0-62 mph) | Top Speed | Kerb Weight |
|---|---|---|---|---|---|---|
| Mulsanne | 6.75 L (6,750 cc) V8 | 170 hp (172 PS; 127 kW) | 500 N·m (369 lb·ft) | 10.2 seconds (10.9 seconds on certain models) | 192 km/h (119 mph) (202 km/h (126 mph) on certain models) | 2,245 kg. (4,949 lbs.); 2,259 kg (4,980 lbs.) for American models |
| Mulsanne S | 6.75 L (6,750 cc) V8 | 205 hp (208 PS; 156 kW) | 540 N·m (398 lb·ft) | 10.6 seconds | 202 km/h (126 mph) | 2,320 kg (5,115 lbs.) (2,290 kg. (5,049 lbs.) for American models |
| Mulsanne Turbo | 6.75 L (6,750 cc) V8 | 300 hp (304 PS; 224 kW) | 660 N·m (487 lb·ft) | 8.1 seconds | 217 km/h (135 mph) | 2,291 kg (5,051 lbs.) |

== Production ==
| Model | Years | Total Production | Short wheelbase | Long wheelbase | Limousine |
|---|---|---|---|---|---|
| Mulsanne | 1980–1987 | 533 | 482 | 49 | 2 |
| Mulsanne Turbo | 1980–1987 | 516 | 498 | 18 | |
| Mulsanne S | 1987–1992 | 970 | 909 | 61 | |
| Total | | 2,019 | 1,889 | 128 | 2 |
