= Rolls-Royce Silver Spirit =

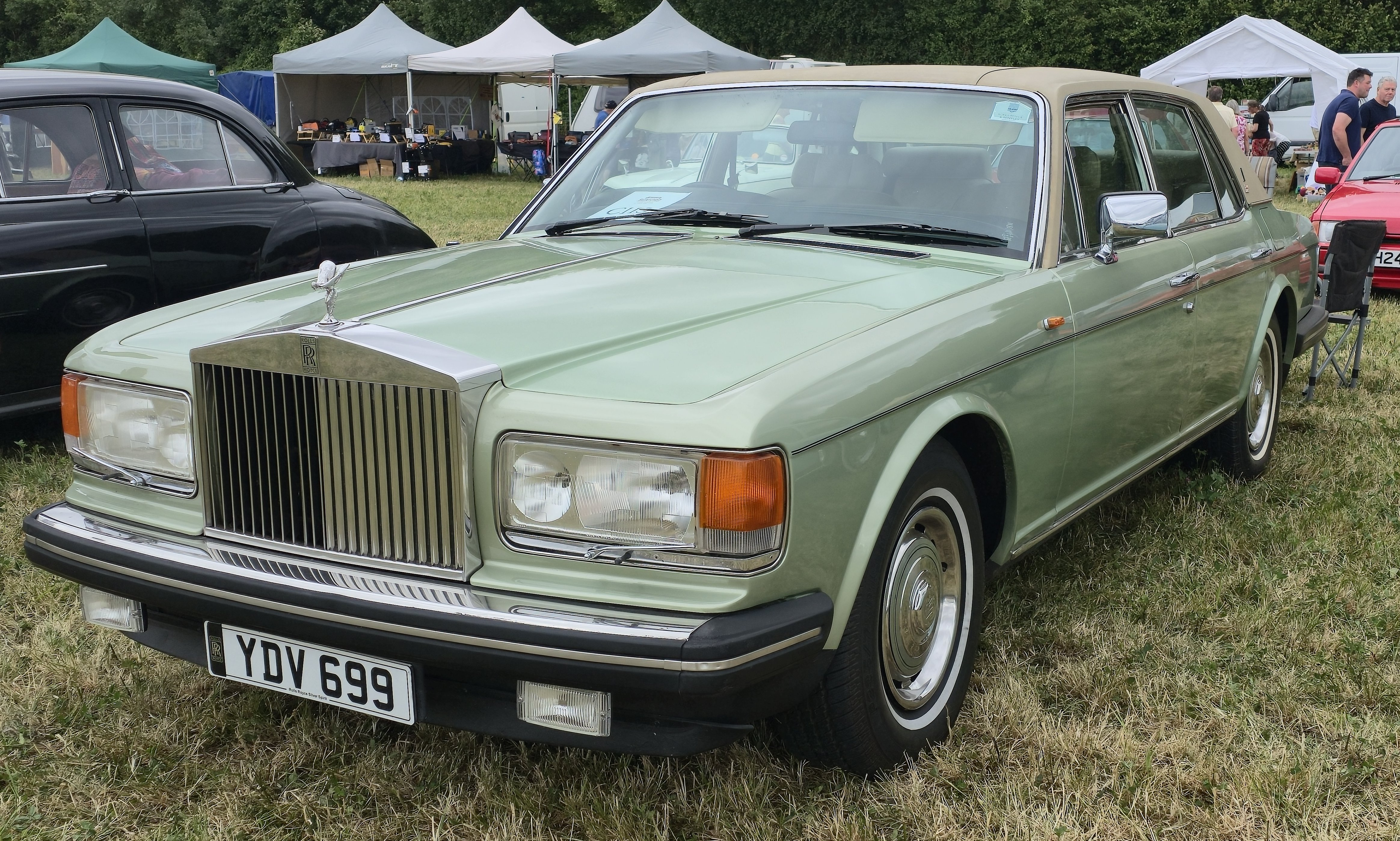
- 1982 Rolls-Royce Silver Spirit

Overview
- Manufacturer: Rolls-Royce Motors
- Also called: Silver Spur; Flying Spur; Silver Dawn
- Production: 1980–1997 (Silver Spirit); 1980–2000 (Silver Spur)
- Assembly: United Kingdom: Crewe, England
- Designer: Fritz Feller (1974)

Body and chassis
- Class: Full-size luxury car
- Body style: 4-door saloon
- Layout: FR layout
- Related: Bentley Eight; Bentley Mulsanne Bentley Turbo R Bentley Brooklands

Chronology
- Predecessor: Rolls-Royce Silver Shadow II (SWB); Rolls-Royce Silver Wraith II (LWB)
- Successor: Rolls-Royce Silver Seraph (SWB); Rolls Royce Park Ward (LWB)

The Rolls-Royce Silver Spirit is a full-size luxury car produced by Rolls-Royce Motors, in Crewe, England, from 1980 to 1997. It was the first model in the SZ series. The Silver Spur is a long-wheelbase version of the Silver Spirit, produced from 1980 to 2000. It was the first car to feature a retractable Spirit of Ecstasy: the spring-loaded mascot sank into the radiator shell if dislodged from its position.

== Mark I ==
Mark I
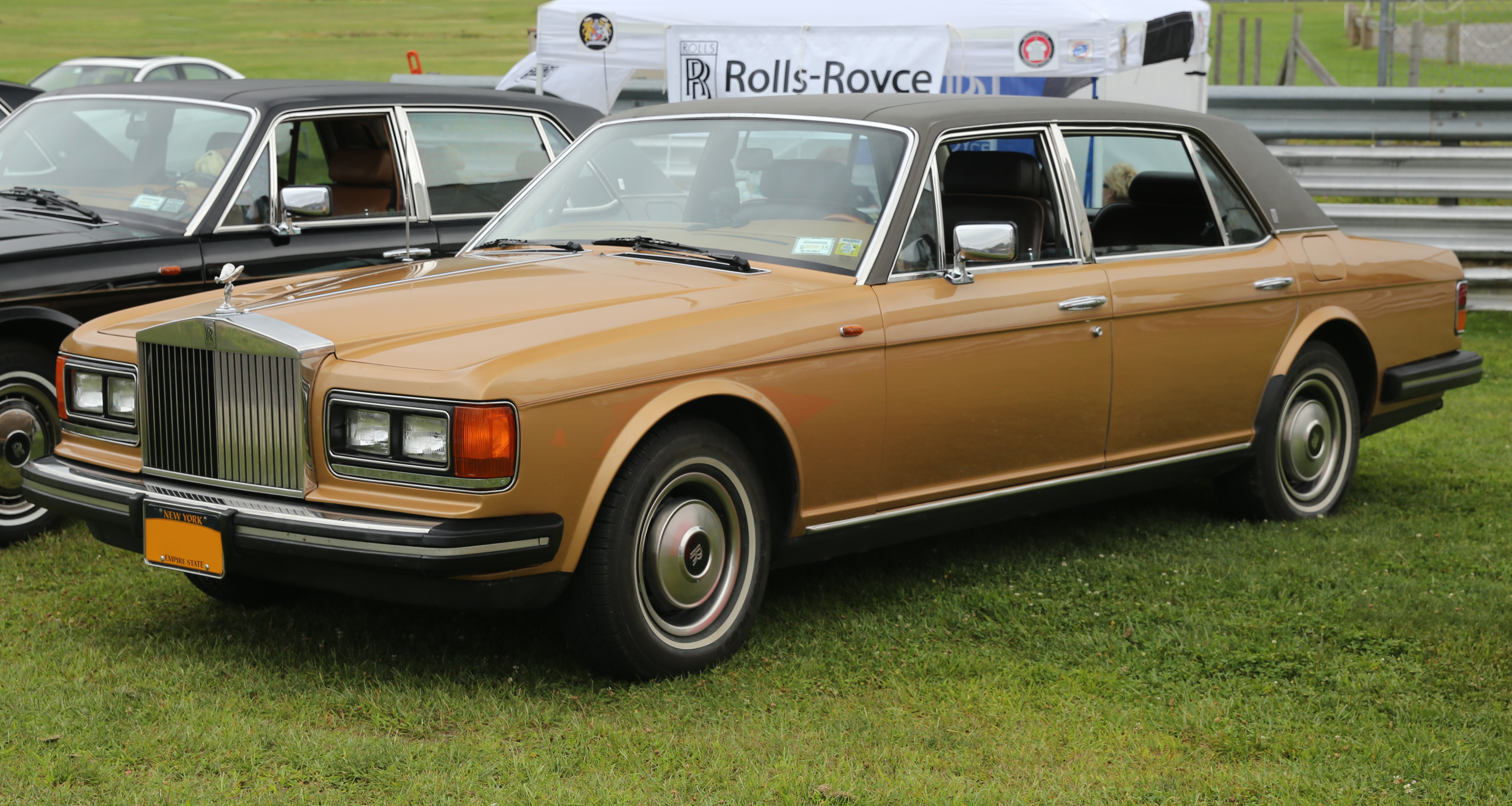
- 1982 Rolls-Royce Silver Spur (U.S.)

Overview
- Also called: Silver Spirit; Silver Spur
- Production: 1980–1988

Body and chassis
- Related: Bentley Mulsanne; Bentley Turbo R Bentley Mulsanne Turbo

Powertrain
- Engine: 6.75 L Rolls-Royce L410 V8
- Transmission: 3-speed GM THM400 automatic

Dimensions
- Wheelbase: 120.5 in (3,061 mm) (Silver Spirit); 124.5 in (3,162 mm) (Silver Spur)
- Length: 207.8 in (5,278 mm) (Silver Spirit); 211.8 in (5,380 mm) (Silver Spur)
- Width: 74.3 in (1,887 mm)
- Height: 58.5 in (1,486 mm)
- Curb weight: 4,980 lb (2,259 kg) (Silver Spirit); 5,040 lb (2,286 kg) (Silver Spur)

The Silver Spirit was introduced by Rolls-Royce in 1980 as the first of a new generation of company models. It formed the basis for the Flying Spur, Silver Dawn, Touring Limousine, Park Ward, and Bentley Mulsanne/Eight series. The Spirit/Spur carried over the basic design of the Silver Shadow, its 6.75 L L410 V8 engine and GM-sourced THM400 3-speed automatic gearbox, and unitary bodywork manufactured at Pressed Steel, which followed the styling of the Pininfarina designed Camargue.

The Spur/Spirit continued the Silver Shadow's emphasis on ride quality by utilising its hydropneumatic self-levelling suspension, modified with Girling automatic hydraulic ride height control system and gas-charged shock absorbers. Sealed beam headlamps were fitted in the United States due to longstanding regulations, while European laws allowed for the fitment of more modern composite units.

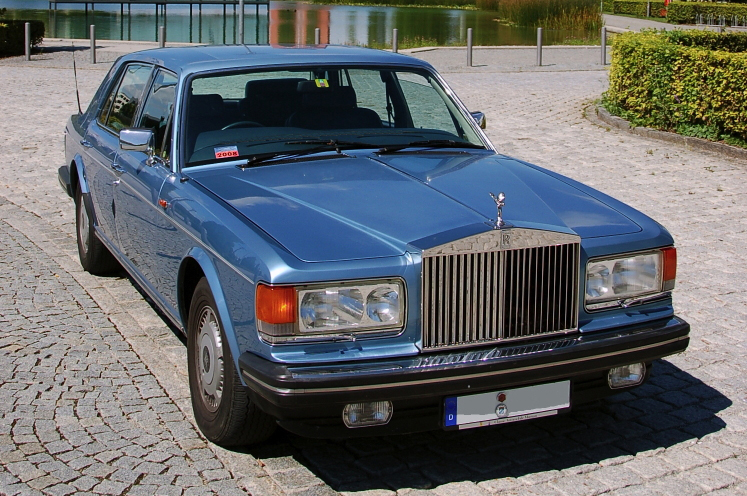
1982 Rolls-Royce Silver Spur (Europe)

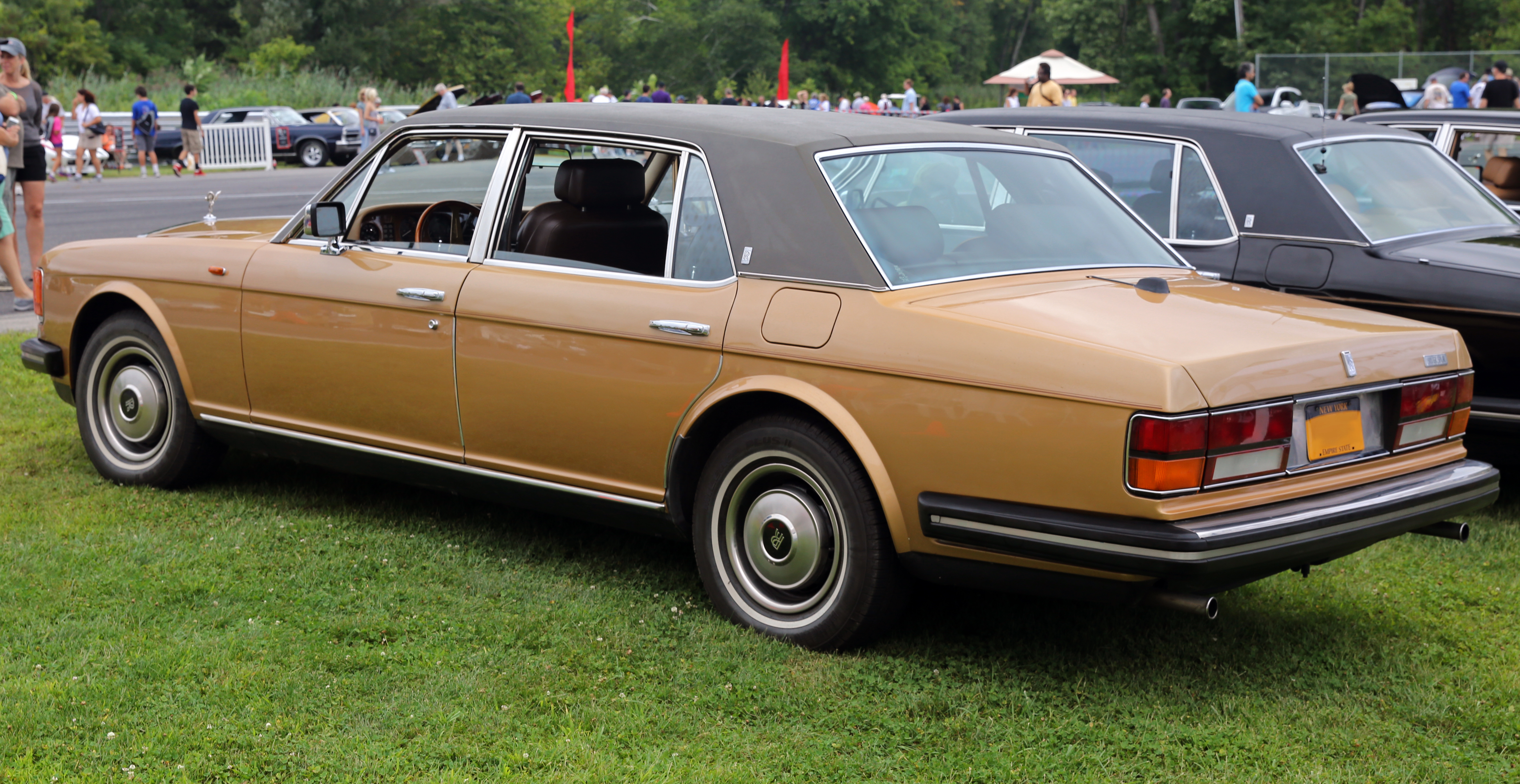
1982 Rolls-Royce Silver Spur (U.S.)

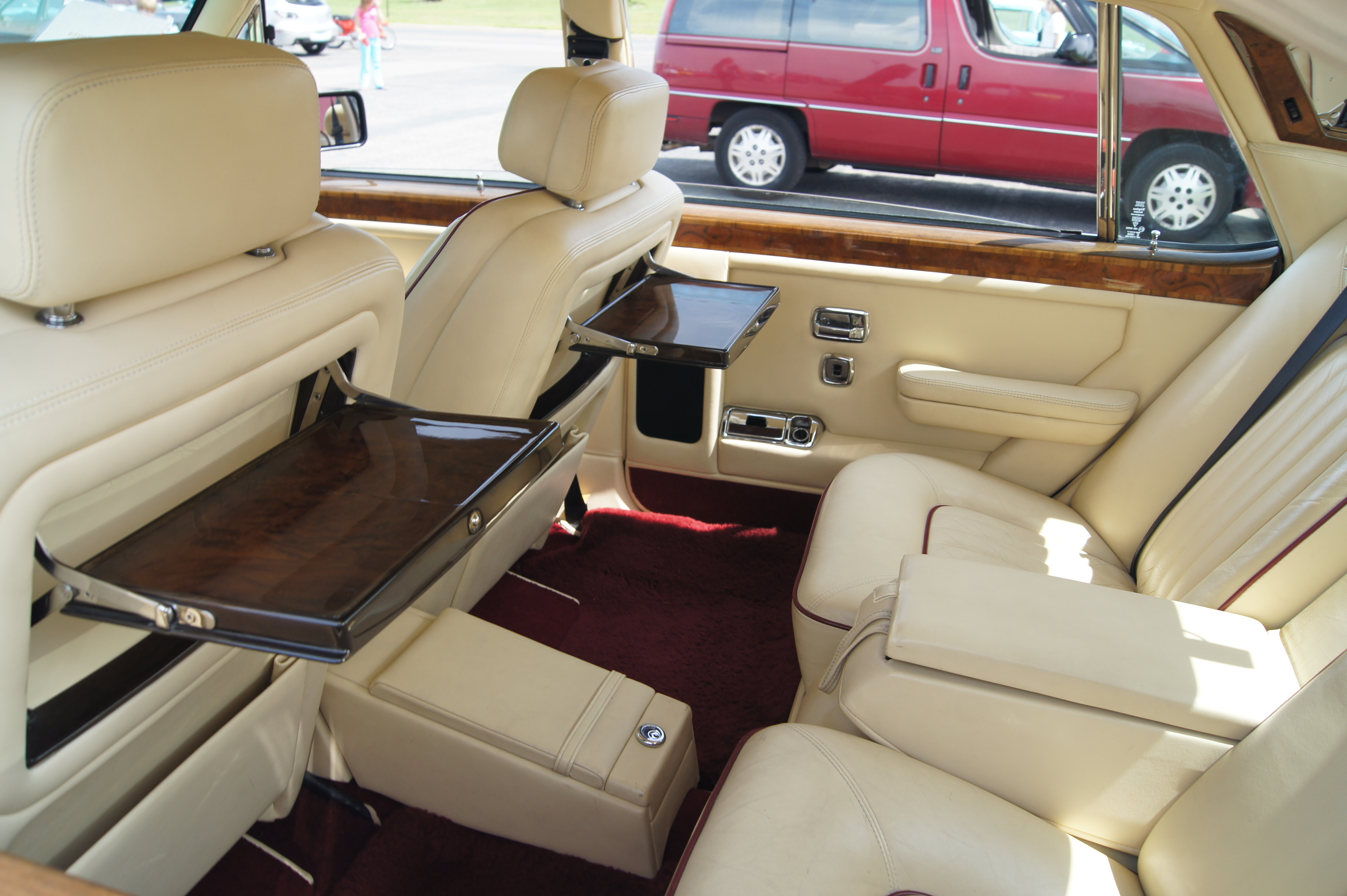
1985 Silver Spur rear seats

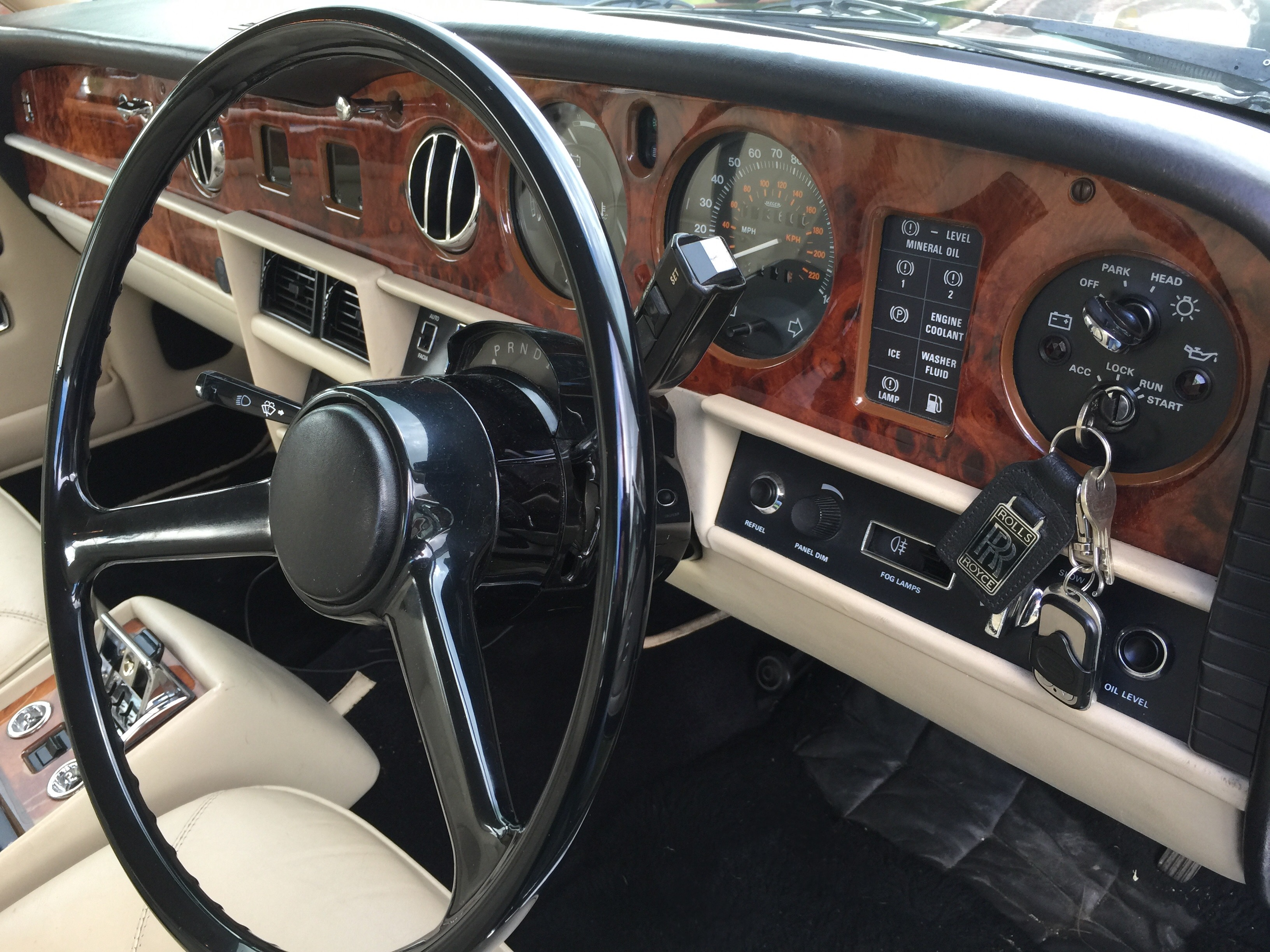
1986 Silver Spirit with RHD dash

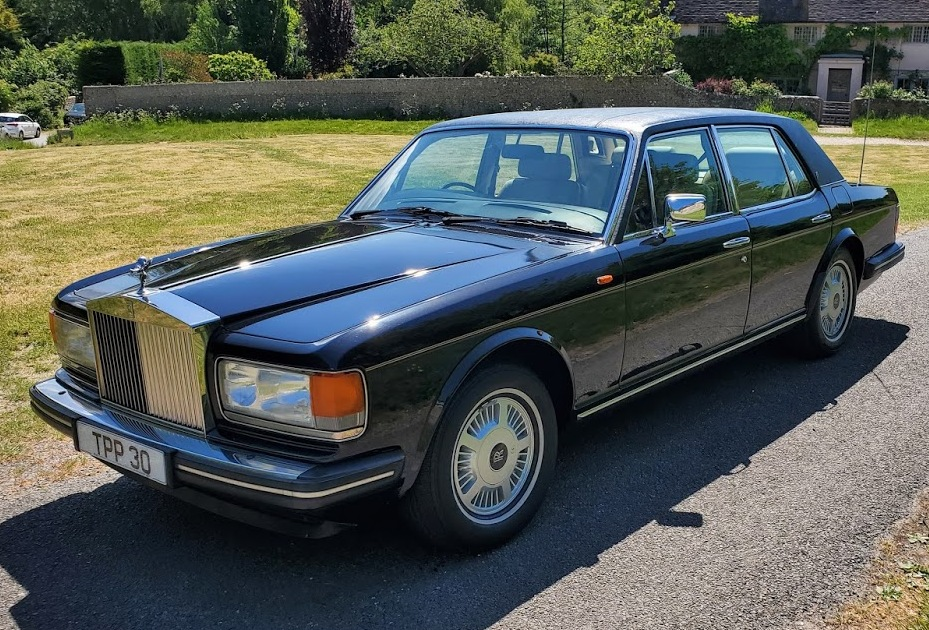
1986 Silver Spirit

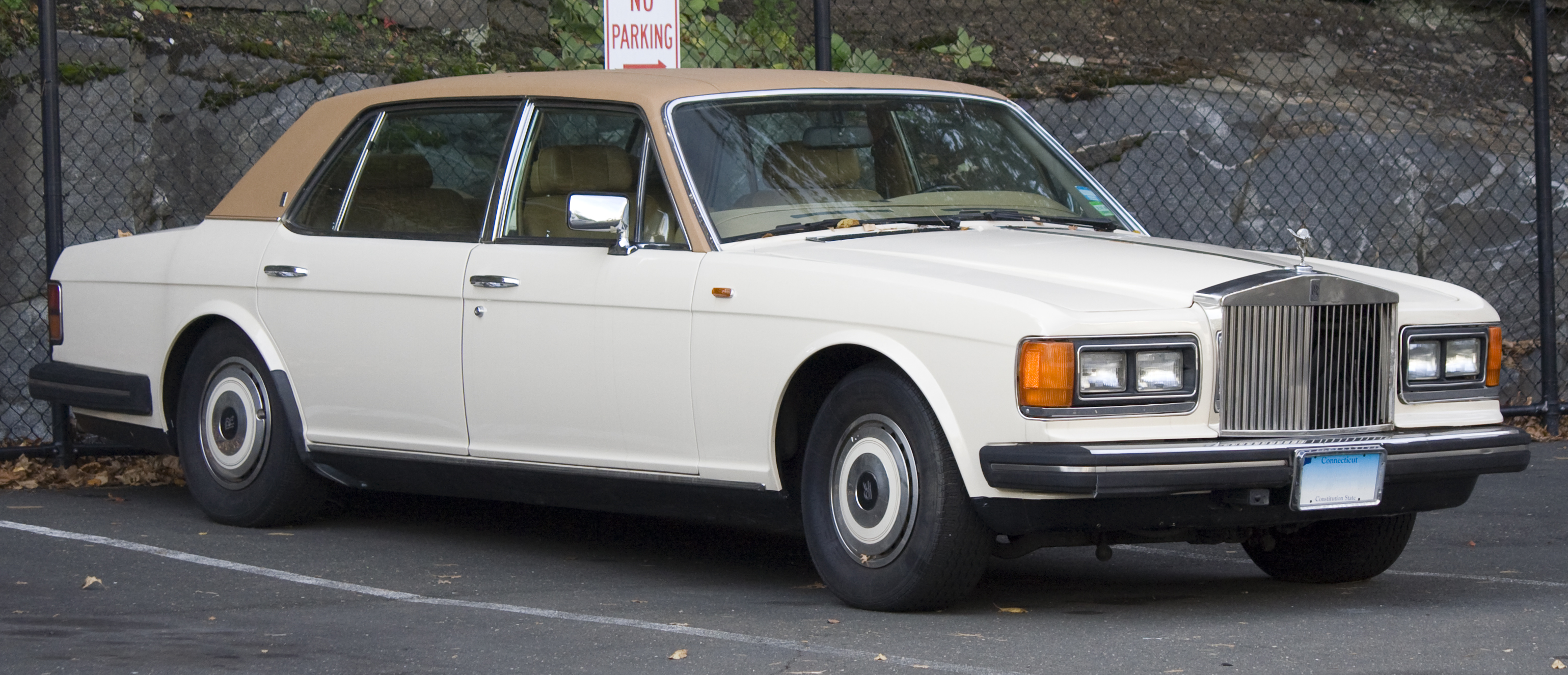
1987 Silver Spirit with U.S. headlights

== Mark II ==
Mark II
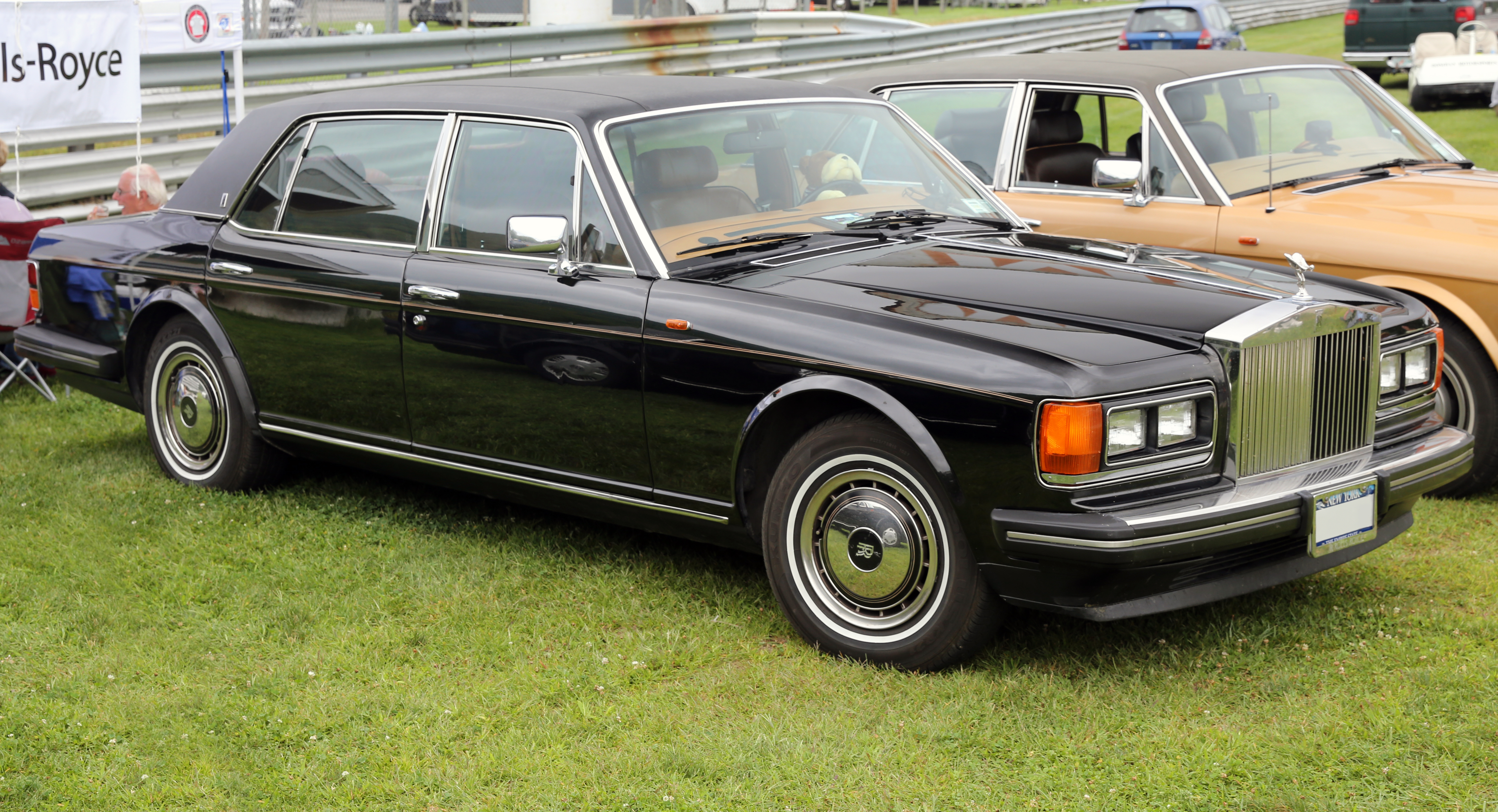
- 1990 Rolls-Royce Silver Spur II (U.S.)

Overview
- Also called: Silver Spirit II; Silver Spur II
- Production: 1988–1992

Body and chassis
- Related: Bentley Eight; Bentley Mulsanne S; Bentley Turbo R

Powertrain
- Engine: 6.75 L Rolls-Royce L410I V8
- Transmission: 3-speed GM THM400 automatic (1988–Winter 1991); 4-speed GM 4L80E automatic (Winter 1991–1992)

Dimensions
- Wheelbase: 120.5 in (3,061 mm) (Silver Spirit); 124.5 in (3,162 mm) (Silver Spur)
- Length: 207.8 in (5,278 mm) (Silver Spirit); 211.8 in (5,380 mm) (Silver Spur)
- Width: 74.3 in (1,887 mm)
- Height: 58.5 in (1,486 mm)
- Curb weight: 5,181 lb (2,350 kg) (Silver Spirit); 5,247 lb (2,380 kg) (Silver Spur)

The Silver Spirit II and Silver Spur II were refinements of the original models, introduced at the 1989 Frankfurt Motor Show. Suspension design saw the most change, with "Automatic Ride Control" introduced, a fully automatic system that adjusted dampers at all four wheels in real time. Other updates included the adoption of ABS and fuel injection as standard for all models and markets. The last Mark I Silver Spirit/Spur was chassis no KCH27798, with Mark II cars starting with 29001. The fuel injection system was now Bosch's MK-Motronic.

Originally retaining the three-speed Turbo Hydramatic GM400 transmission from earlier Spirits/Spurs, a four-speed unit (the GM 4L80E) was introduced in the winter of 1991. The size of the petrol tank was also increased, up to 107 L (23.5 imp gal), meaning that the car's range was now in excess of 310 miles (500 km).

Exterior and interior changes were minimal, with a considerably smaller steering wheel and two additional ventilation outlets added to the fascia mildly modernising the look up front.

== Mark III ==
Mark III
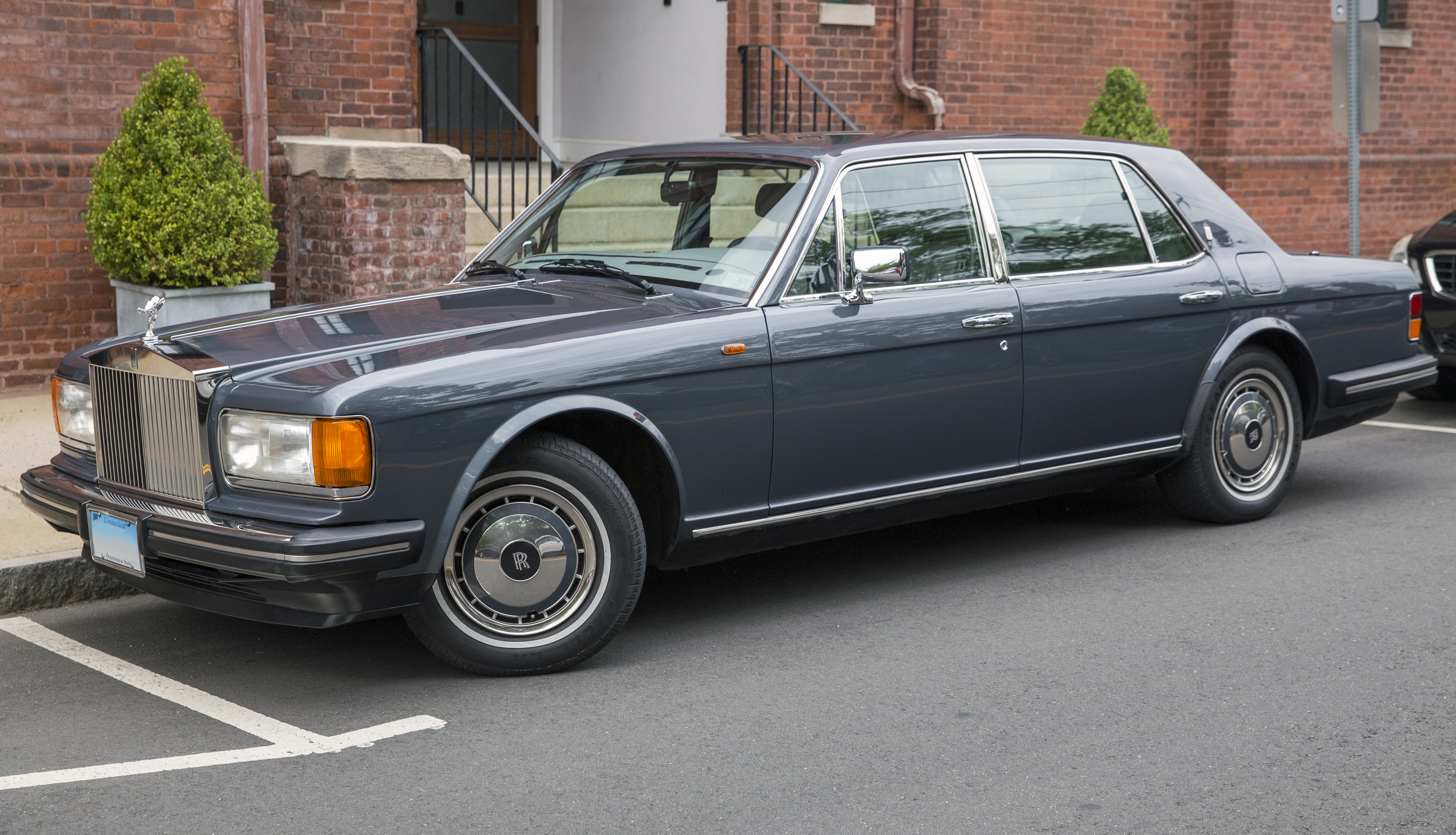
- 1994 Rolls-Royce Silver Spur III (U.S.)

Overview
- Also called: Silver Spirit III; Silver Spur III; Flying Spur; Silver Dawn
- Production: 1992–1995

Body and chassis
- Related: Bentley Brooklands; Bentley Turbo RT; Bentley Turbo S

Powertrain
- Engine: 6.75 L Rolls-Royce L410 V8
- Transmission: 4-speed GM 4L80E automatic

Dimensions
- Wheelbase: 120.5 in (3,061 mm) (Spirit); 124.5 in (3,162 mm) (Spur); 148.5 in (3,772 mm) (Touring Limousine)
- Length: 207.4 in (5,268 mm) (Spirit); 211.4 in (5,370 mm) (Flying Spur); 211.8 in (5,380 mm) (Silver Spur); 235.4 in (5,979 mm) (Touring Limousine)
- Width: 74.3 in (1,887 mm)
- Height: 58.5 in (1,486 mm) (Spirit/Spur/Dawn); 60.4 in (1,534 mm) (Touring Limousine)

The Silver Spirit III and Silver Spur III were introduced in 1993, featuring engine improvements and some cosmetic updates. A new design of intake manifold and cylinder heads increased power output. The parameters of the semi-active suspension system were modified so that shock absorbers would default into "soft" ride mode when they wore out (rather than "hard" in the previous Mark II, noticeably impacting ride quality). Dual airbags were introduced inside, along with independent adjustment of the rear seats.

=== Flying Spur ===
The 1994–1995 Flying Spur was a turbocharged, higher performance version of the Silver Spur III. 134 cars were produced.

=== Silver Dawn ===
The Silver Dawn is a special edition of the Silver Spur III with several additional options, such as Electronic Traction Assistance System and rear seat heaters. The radiator height is reduced by 2 inches (51 mm) and the size of the Spirit of Ecstasy was reduced by 20 per cent. The new front was later inherited by the Mark IV series. This model appeared one year earlier on the American market before becoming available to the rest of the world.

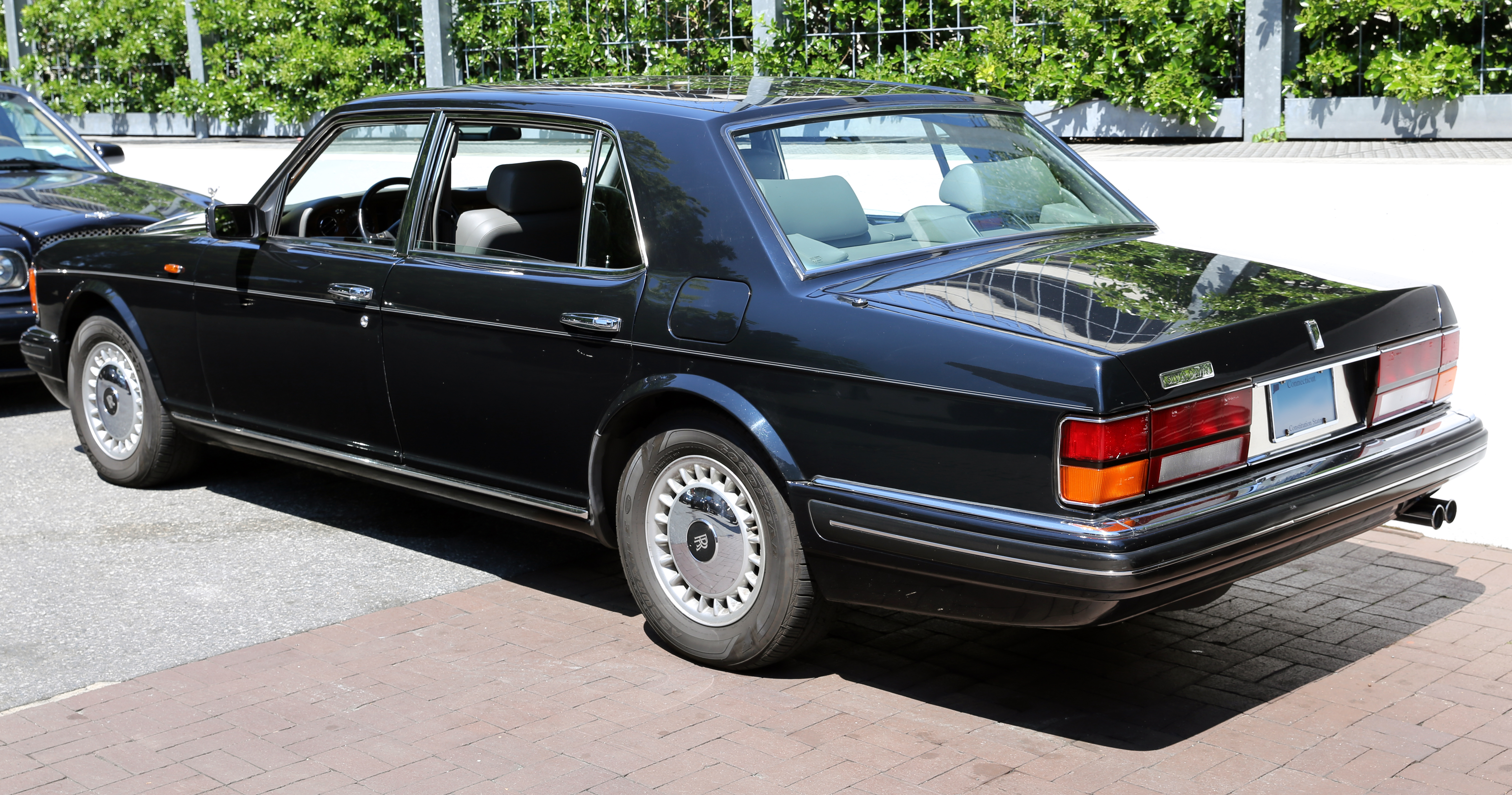
Rolls-Royce Silver Dawn (U.S.)

== Mark IV ==
Mark IV
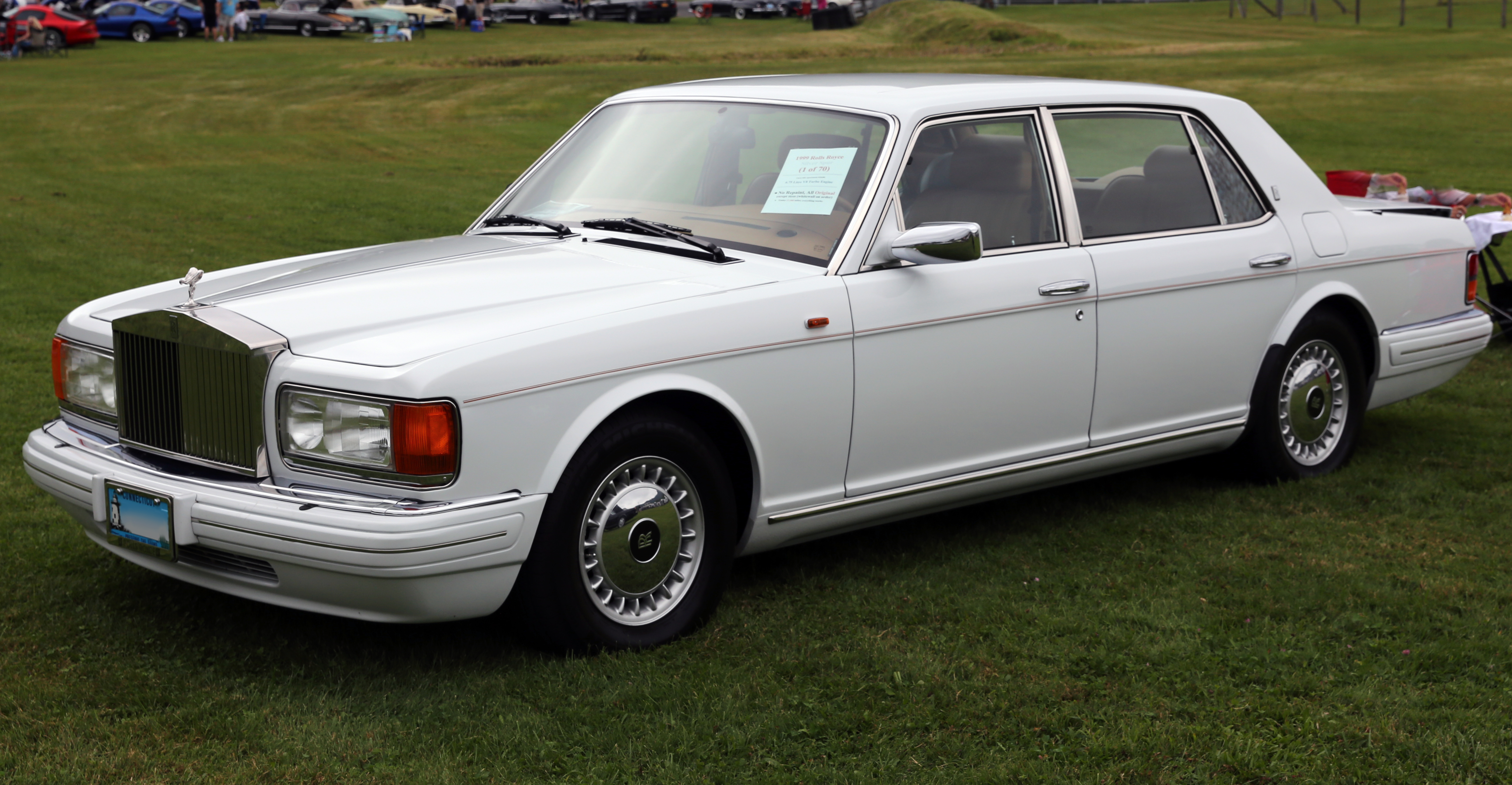
- 1999 Rolls-Royce Silver Spur (U.S.)

Overview
- Also called: Rolls-Royce Silver Spur; Rolls-Royce Silver Spirit IV; Rolls-Royce Silver Spur IV; Rolls-Royce Park Ward Limousine
- Production: 1995–2000

Body and chassis
- Related: Bentley Brooklands; Bentley Turbo RT

Powertrain
- Engine: 6.75 L Rolls-Royce L410 turbo V8
- Transmission: 4-speed automatic

Dimensions
- Wheelbase: 3,061 mm (120.5 in) (Silver Spirit); 3,162 mm (124.5 in) (Silver Spur); 3,772 mm (148.5 in) (Touring Limousine); 4,382 mm (172.5 in) (Touring Limousine Extended)
- Length: 5,295 mm (208.5 in) (Silver Spirit); 5,375 mm (211.6 in) (Silver Spur, early); 5,395 mm (212.4 in) (Silver Spur, late); 5,990 mm (235.8 in) (Touring Limousine); 6,620 mm (260.6 in) (Touring Limousine Extended)
- Width: 1,887 mm (74.3 in)
- Height: 1,486 mm (58.5 in)

Designed beginning in the autumn of 1992, the New Silver Spirit/New Silver Spur was the final revision of the Silver Spirit and Silver Spur, introduced late in 1995 as a 1996 model.

A marketing decision was made that the cars should not get an official "series IV" designation because the number four is a homonym for death in some Far Eastern languages.

Major changes included the introduction of a Garrett turbocharger on all models and the replacement of the previous Bosch engine management systems with one by Zytec. Also new were updated integrated front and rear bumpers and sixteen-inch wheels. As of 1997, the long wheelbase became standard, with limousine models offered in extra-long only. Inside, a wooden column running down the centre of the dashboard was added.

Silver Spirit production ended during the 1997 model year, although occasional vehicles continued to be produced through the year 2000 to use up bodies and parts remaining in stock.

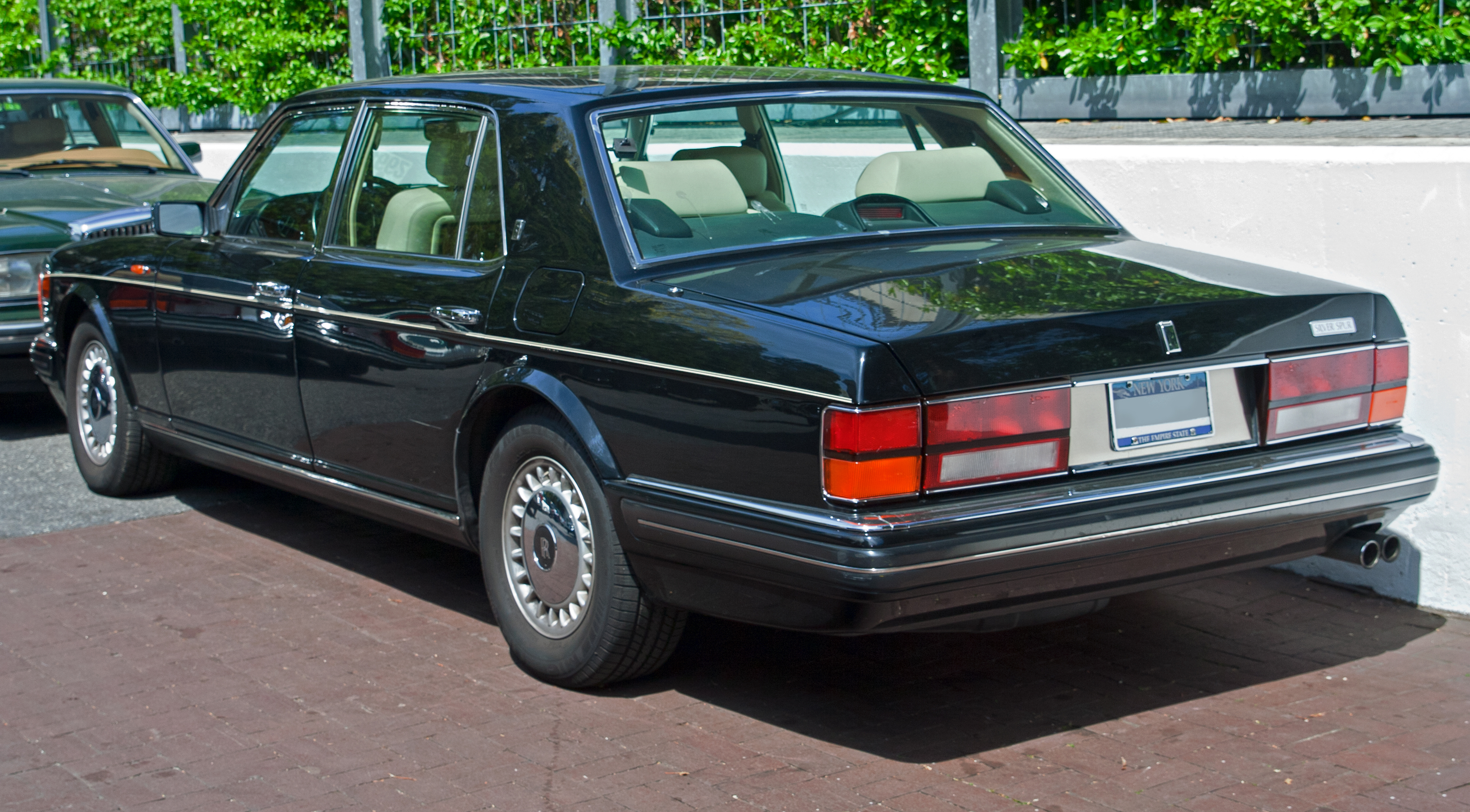
1996 Silver Spur

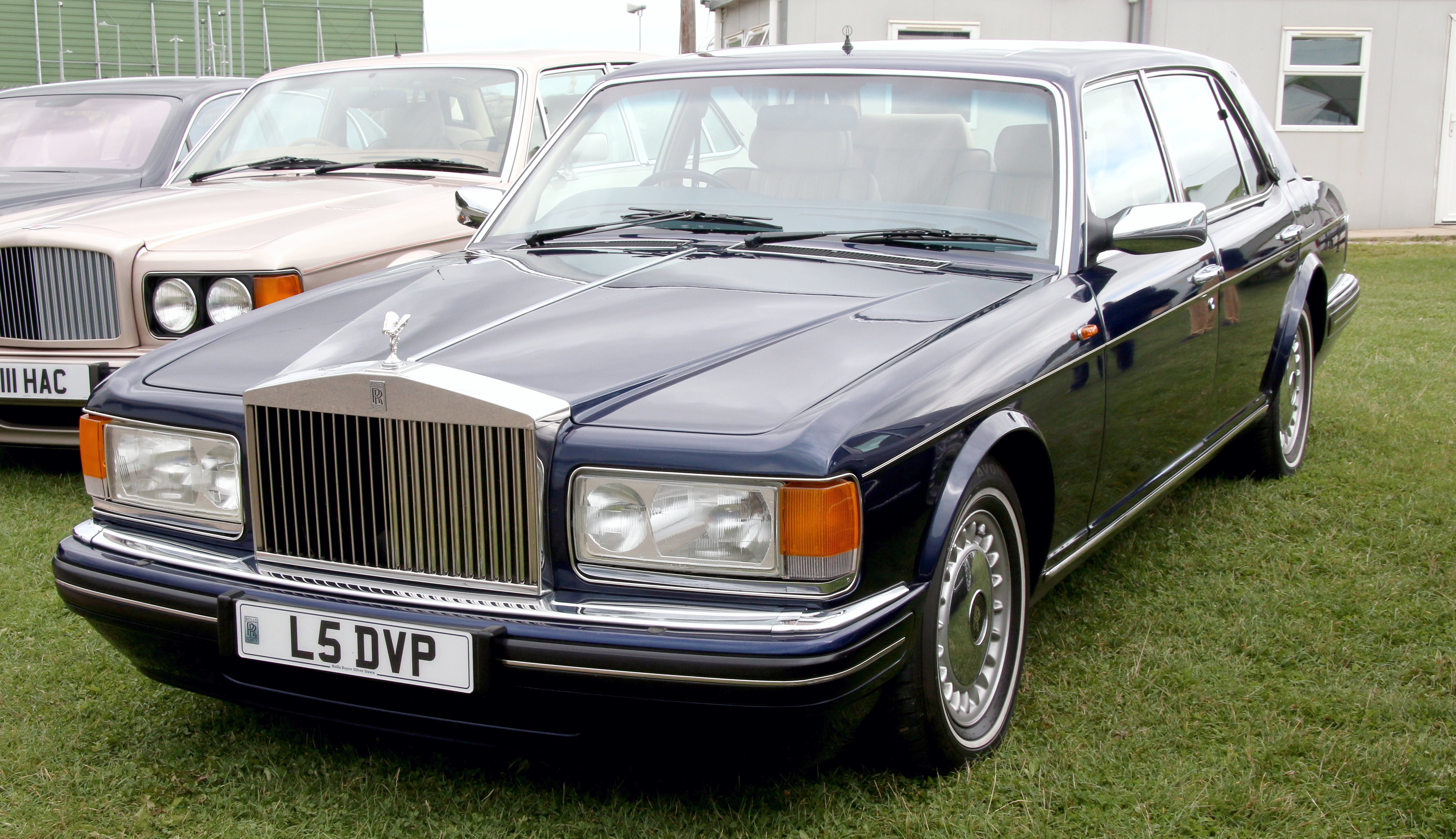
1997 Silver Dawn

=== Park Ward Limousine ===
The Rolls-Royce Park Ward Limousine is a limited edition Silver Spur/Spirit mark IV with a 24-inch (610 mm) extended wheelbase and a 2 in (51 mm) taller roof. The Park Ward replaced the Silver Spur/Spirit Touring Limousine. In the middle of the 1998 model year the name was changed to Rolls-Royce Silver Spur Park Ward. The model nomenclature on the badge on the rear of the car says Park Ward. Standard equipment on this model included a bar cabinet with crystal decanters and goblets, intercom, an electrically operated division and a backseat sunroof.

The Rolls-Royce Park Ward Limousine should not be confused with succeeding stretched Rolls-Royce Silver Seraph Park Ward, which was based on the car that replaced the Silver Spirit and was available from 2000–2002.

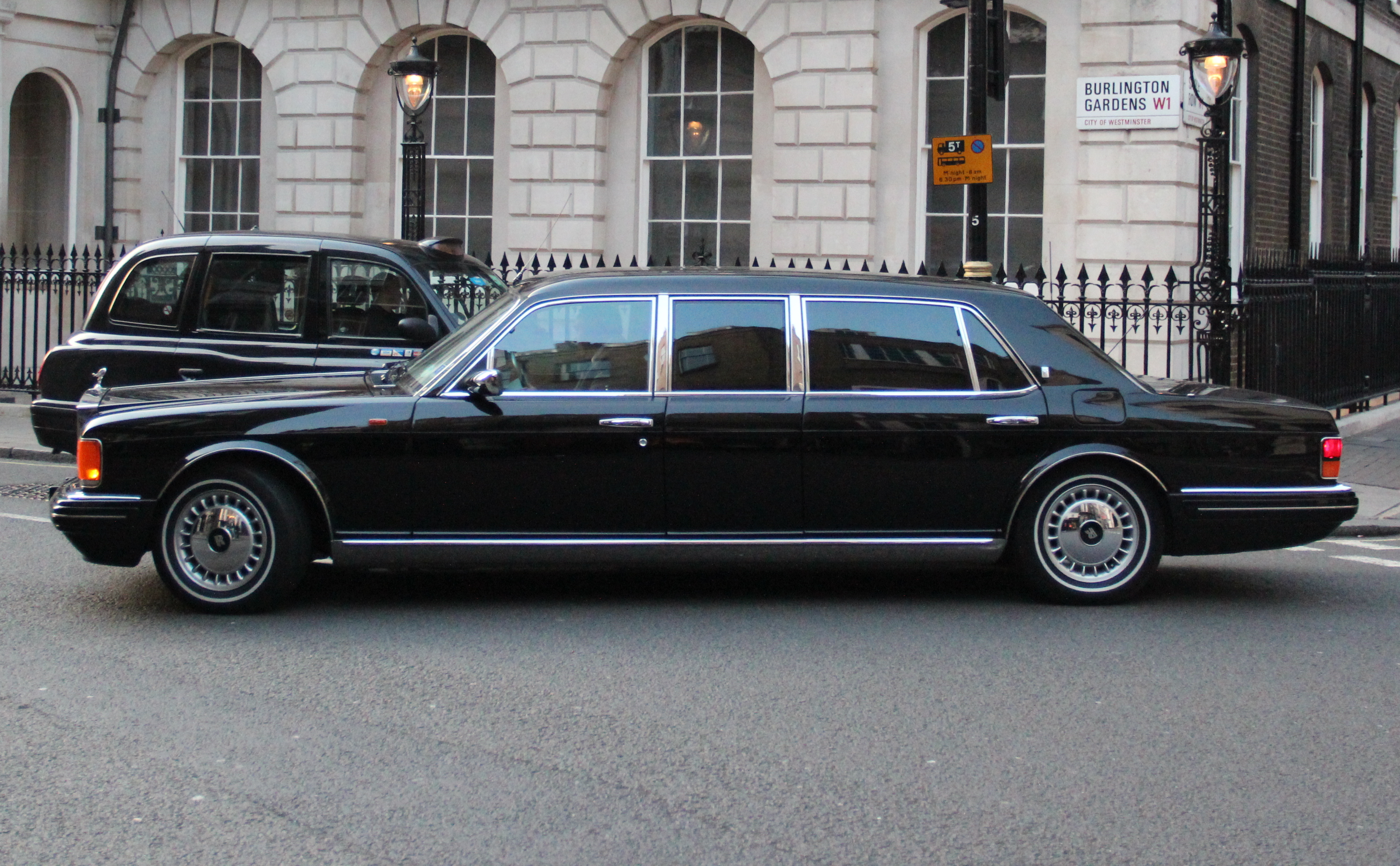
Left side

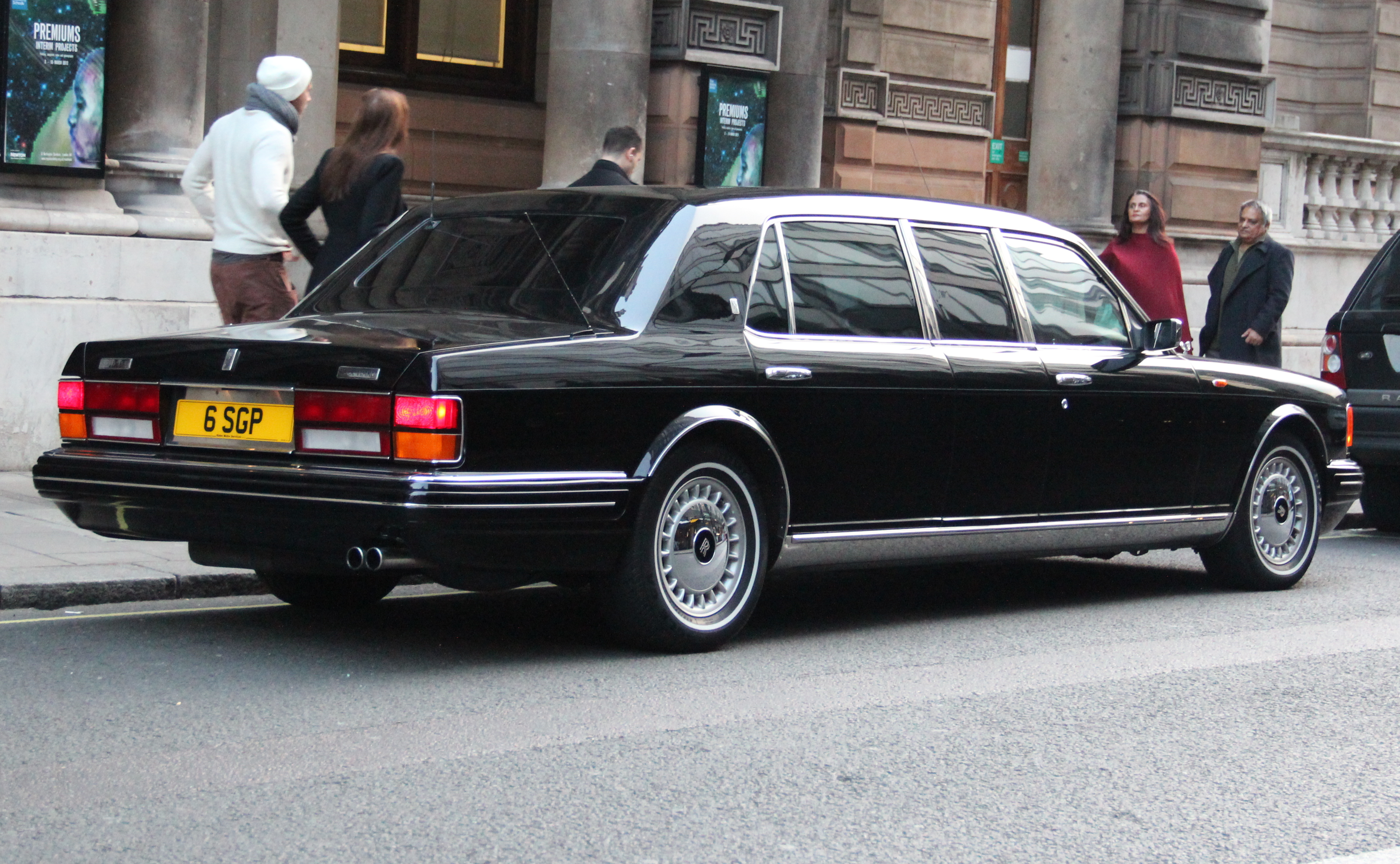
Rear 3/4 view

== Touring Limousines ==
Rolls-Royce Touring Limousines were built to a Robert Jankel design in cooperation with coach builder Mulliner Park Ward in London.

The first Silver Spur Limousine was produced in 1982. 16 cars had the 36-inch (914 mm) extended wheelbase, and 84 cars with 42-inch (1,067 mm) extended wheelbase were produced in 1984 and later. One car had a 14-inch (356 mm) wheelbase extension. These cars were extended at the B-pillar, between the front and rear doors.

From 1991 on, 99 units of the Touring Limousine with a 24-inch (610 mm) wheelbase extension were produced. The car was lengthened at the C-pillar with an opera window added. Like these earlier models, most of the cars had fold-down occasional seats in the rear passenger area.

The Park Ward Limousine was the last one to be officially extended, by 24 inches (610 mm), again at the C-pillar, with 70 vehicles produced from 1996 to 1999.

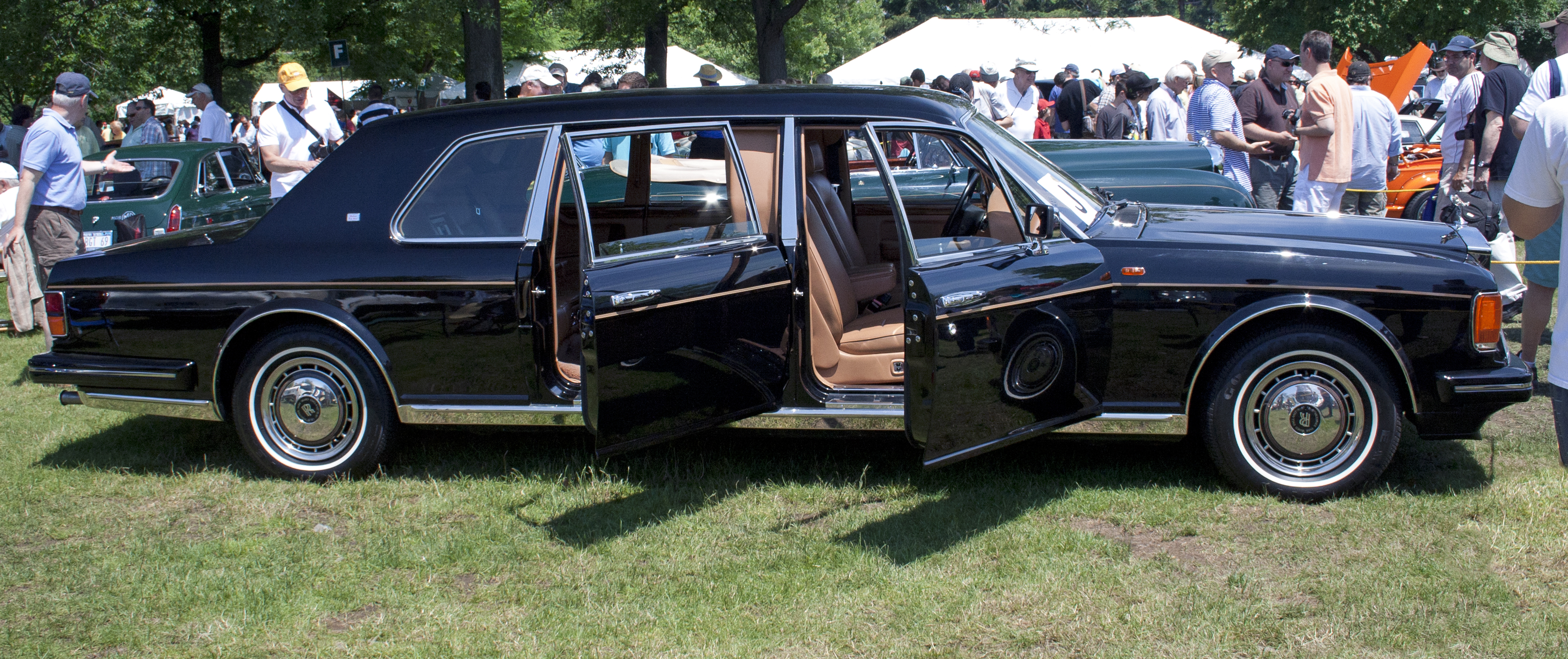
1993 Rolls-Royce Silver Spur II Touring Limousine

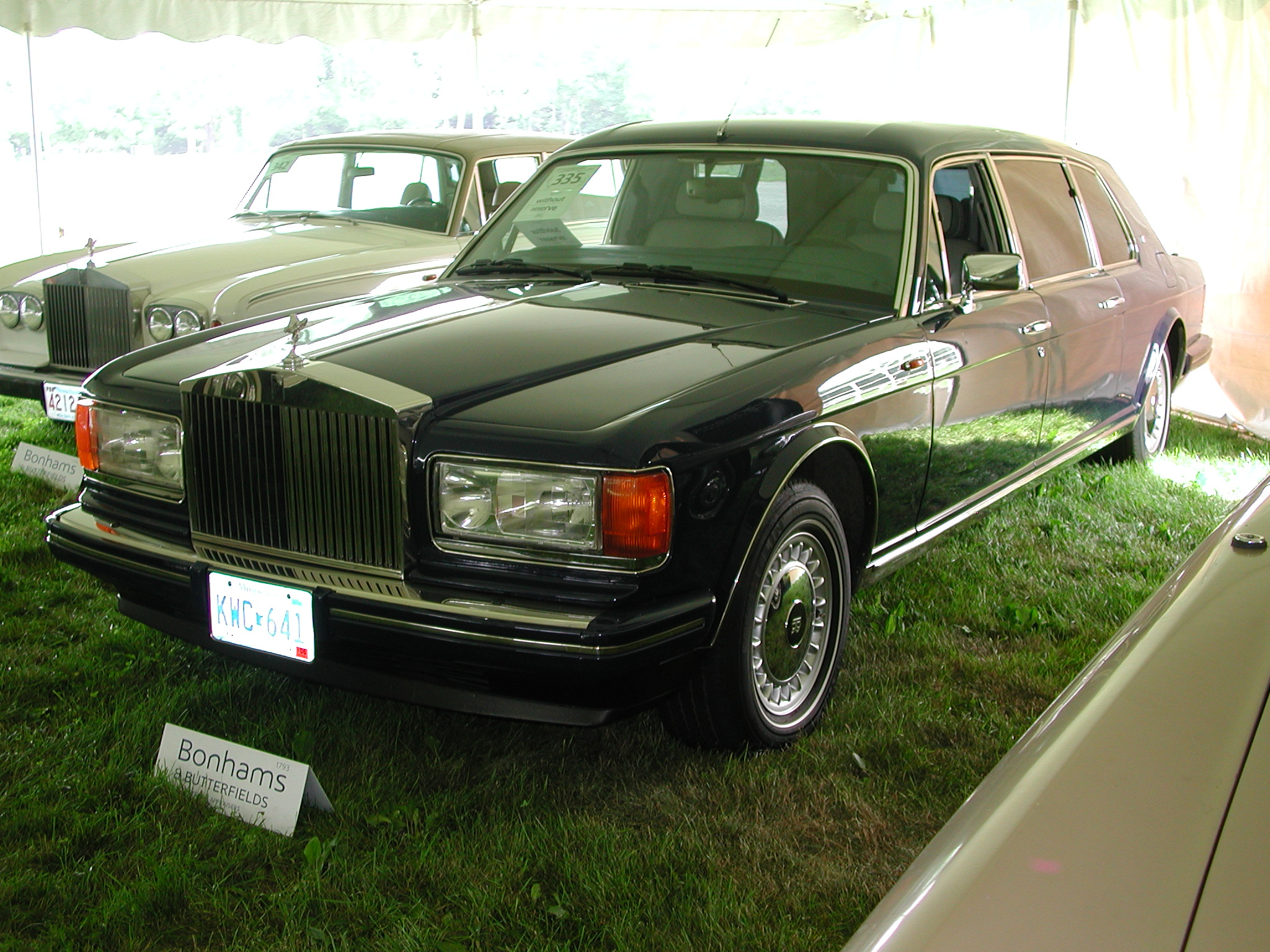
1994 Rolls-Royce Silver Spur III Armoured Touring Limousine

== Production ==
Years are the model years based on the VIN (not the years of manufacturing).

=== Mark I ===
- 1980–1989 Silver Spirit: 8126
- 1980–1989 Silver Spur: 6240
  - 1985 Silver Spur Centenary: 26
  - 1982–1985 Silver Spur Extended 910 mm (36 in): 16
  - 1984 Silver Spur Extended 360 mm (14 in): 1
  - 1984–1988 Silver Spur Extended 1,100 mm (42 in): 84

=== Mark II ===
- 1989–1993 Silver Spirit II: 1152
- 1990–1993 Silver Spur II: 1658
  - 1990–1991 Mulliner Spur: 71
  - 1992–1993 Silver Spur II Touring Limousine: 56

=== Mark III ===
- 1994–1995 Silver Spirit III: 234
- 1994–1995 Silver Spur III: 465
  - 1994–1995 Silver Spur III Touring Limousine: 36
  - 1995 Flying Spur: 134
  - 1995–1998 Silver Dawn: 237
  - 1996, 1998 Silver Spur Touring Limousine: 9

=== Mark IV ===
- 1996–1997 New Silver Spirit: 145
- 1996–2000 New Silver Spur: 802
  - 1996–1999 Park Ward Limousine: 49
  - 1997–1998 Touring Limousine Extended 1,200 mm (48 in): 3
  - 1997–1999 Silver Spur Division: 38
  - 1998 Silver Spur Non-Division: 20
