= Dirk van Braeckel =

Belgian automobile designer

- Born: 19 February 1958 (age 68)
- Education: Royal College of Art
- Occupation: Car designer
- Employer: Audi

Dirk van Braeckel (born 19 February 1958 in Deinze), is a Belgian car designer. He is known for the designing of various models for Volkswagen Group, especially for the Bentley brand.

== Career ==
Born in Deinze, after leaving school, van Braeckel studied electrical engineering, before joining Ford as an apprentice car designer in Cologne, West Germany. Ford then agreed to sponsor him undertake a degree in car design at the Royal College of Art, London.

On graduation, he joined Audi in 1984, working on external design including the Audi A8 concept and Audi A3. In 1993, Volkswagen Group boss Ferdinand Piëch personally chose him to be the design head for Volkswagen's newly purchased Škoda Auto division, where he revised the entire model line-up, designing the Octavia and Fabia models.

After Volkswagen purchased Bentley in 1998 from Vickers plc, van Braeckel joined the British-based company in August 1999 as Director of Design and Styling. His brief was to design a car that could sell in higher volumes than the $240,000 Bentley Arnage model. Van Braeckel designed the Bentley Continental GT, which in 2004 sold 5,983 units, exceeding forecasts by 62%, and in 2009 the Bentley Mulsanne which was designed by him was launched.

== Cars ==
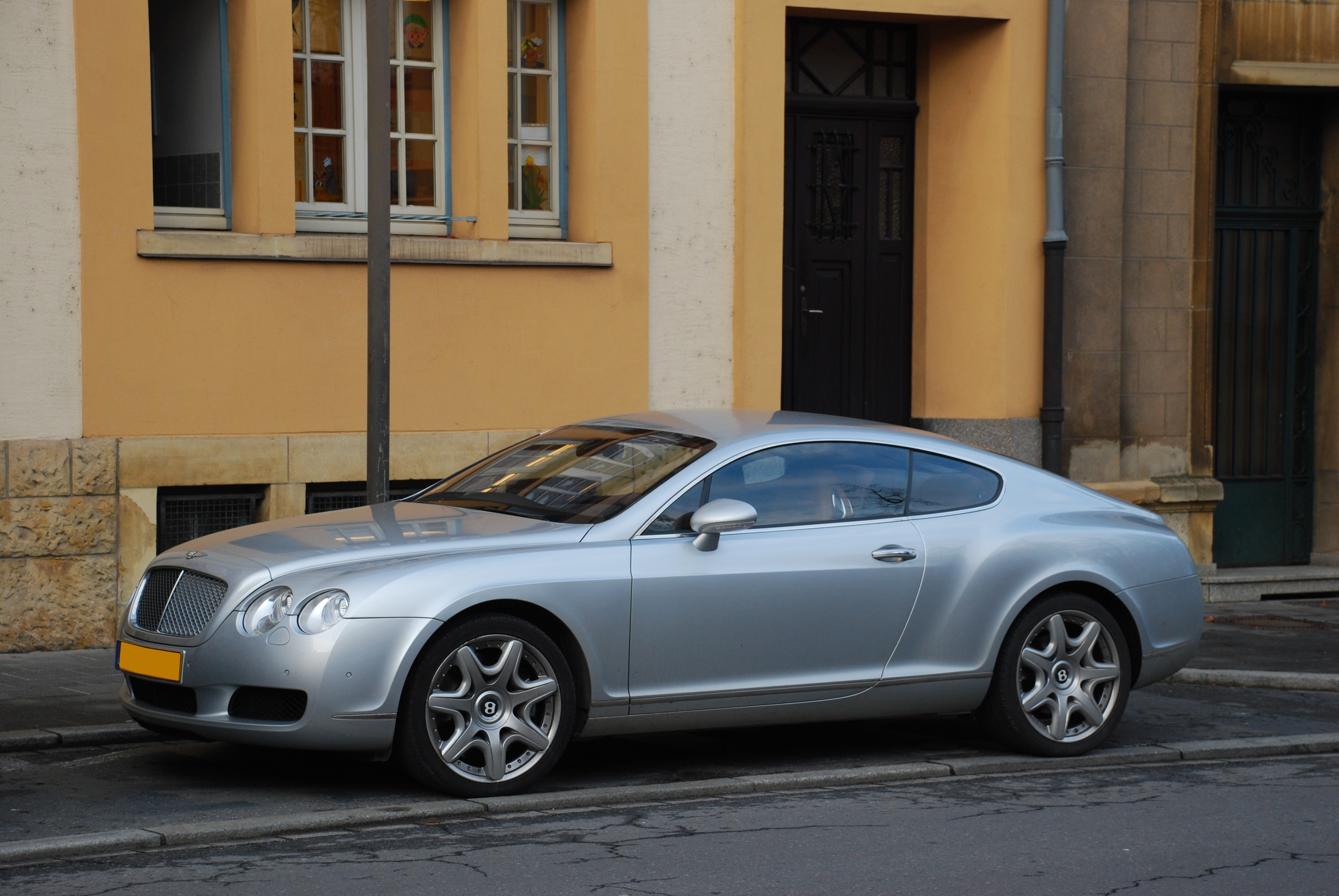
Bentley Continental GT

- Audi A8 concept, 1994
- Audi A3, 1996
- Škoda Octavia, 1996
- Škoda Fabia, 1999
- Škoda Octavia, 2004
- Bentley Continental GT, 2004
- Bentley Flying Spur, 2005
- Bentley Azure, 2006
- Bentley Brooklands, 2007
- Bentley Mulsanne, 2009
- Bentley EXP 9 F, 2012

== Awards ==
In 2007, van Braeckel was awarded the laureate of Antwerp's Christophe Plantin Prize, which honours Belgian citizens whose cultural, artistic or scientific activities contribute to the country's prestige abroad. In 2008, van Braeckel was awarded the European Automotive Design Award by Designers (Europe).
