= Bentley Mulsanne (2010) =

British full-size luxury car

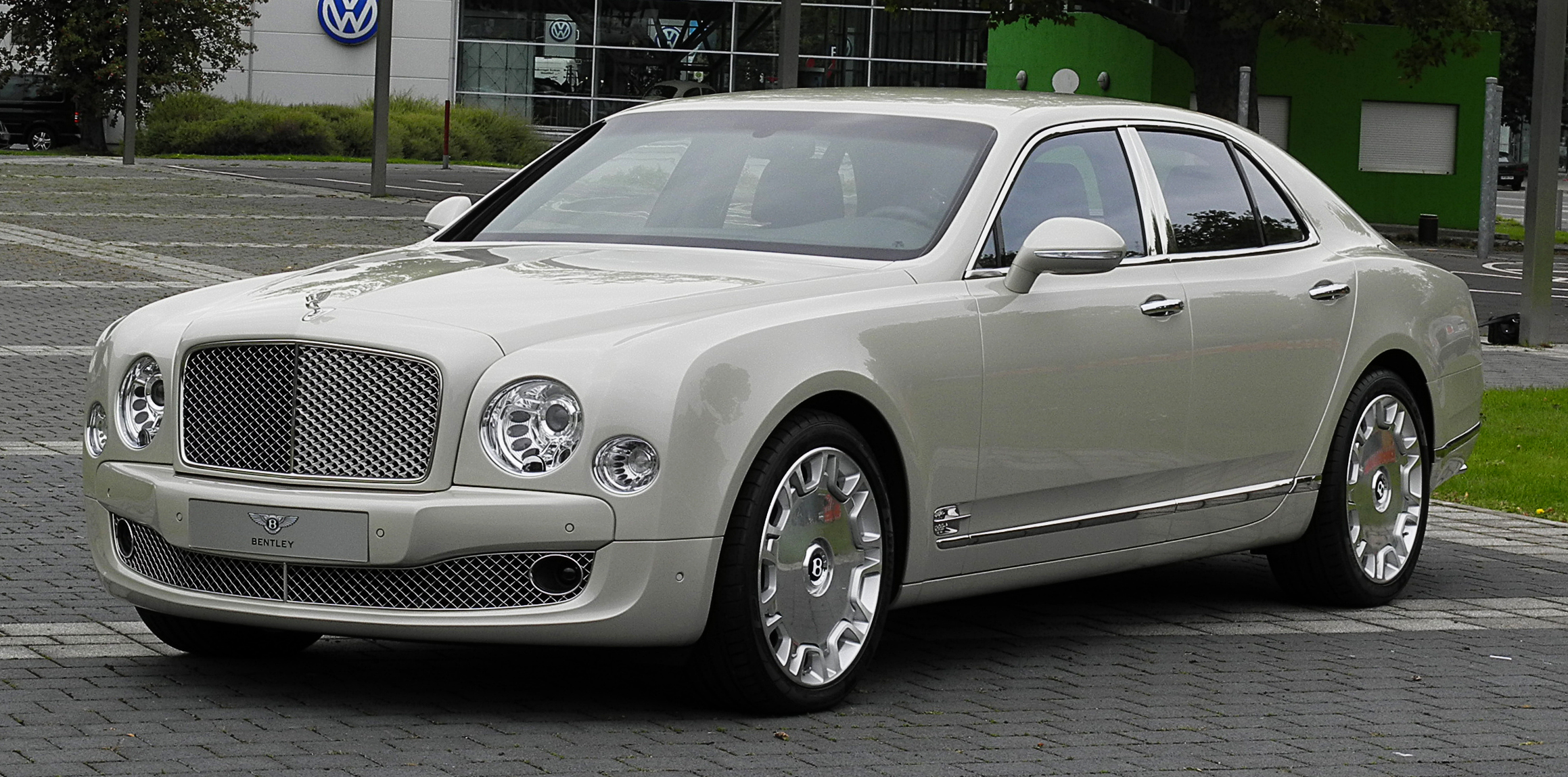

Overview
- Manufacturer: Bentley Motors
- Production: March 2010 – June 2020
- Model years: 2011–2020
- Assembly: United Kingdom: Crewe (Bentley Crewe)
- Designer: Dirk van Braeckel (2007); Robin Page (interior)

Body and chassis
- Class: Full-size luxury car (F)
- Body style: 4-door saloon
- Layout: Front-engine, rear-wheel-drive

Powertrain
- Engine: 6.75 L twin-turbocharged Rolls-Royce–Bentley L-series V8 engine
- Transmission: 8-speed ZF 8HP automatic

Dimensions
- Wheelbase: 3,266 mm (128.6 in); 3,516 mm (138.4 in) (EWB); 4,266 mm (168.0 in) (Grand Limousine)
- Length: 5,575 mm (219.5 in); 5,825 mm (229.3 in) (EWB); 6,575 mm (258.9 in) (Grand Limousine)
- Width: 1,926 mm (75.8 in)
- Height: 1,521 mm (59.9 in); 1,541 mm (60.7 in) (EWB)
- Kerb weight: 2,650 kg (5,840 lb); 2,730–2,751 kg (6,019–6,064 lb) (EWB)

Chronology
- Predecessor: Bentley Arnage

The Bentley Mulsanne is a full-size luxury car that was manufactured and marketed by British automaker Bentley Motors from March 2010 to June 2020. It was the flagship automobile for the company during its production run. Internal to Bentley, the Mulsanne was referred to as "The Grand Bentley" during its development.

Replacing the Rolls-Royce-based Arnage, the Mulsanne was Bentley's first independently-built automobile since the 8 Litre, which W. O. Bentley conceived. Unveiled initially at the Pebble Beach Concours d'Elegance, the Mulsanne retained two key elements from the Arnage—rear-wheel drive with the front axle centerline optimally positioned forward, and a 6.75-litre push-rod V8 engine equipped with twin-turbochargers. The individualistic headlamps were designed to resemble those of the Jaguar S-Type from the 1960s. Throughout its ten-year manufacturing period, Bentley produced approximately 7,900 examples at the Crewe facility. The Mulsanne has generally been well received, with Jeremy Clarkson claiming that the ride is quiet and the torques were great while criticising the number of switches and the fact that it was less "tasteful" than a Rolls-Royce Ghost.

In 2005, development work on the Mulsanne officially commenced under the codename "Project Kimberley", the name of which was inspired by the Kimberley diamond originating from South Africa. Styled by Belgian automobile designer Dirk van Braeckel, the Mulsanne is a four-door sedan which was offered in two body lengths: short- and extended-wheelbase. Incorporating various internal and external elements from the Arnage, it employs a blend of high-strength steel and lightweight aluminium. The team that assembles the Mulsanne is composed of 298 Bentley employees. The interior was designed under the direction of British automobile designer Robin Page, who also led that of the second-generation Continental GT. Each individual unit undergoes a meticulous process that takes 400 hours (2 weeks), of which 136 hours (five days) are dedicated to interior trimming.

Production of the Mulsanne concluded on 25 June 2020, signifying not only the end of its ten-year manufacture but also the end of Bentley's 6¾-litre engine after a consecutive 61-year production period. The 6¾-litre V8 engine, introduced in 1959 and heavily revised and updated in 2010, could not be updated any further to meet the increasingly stringent emission regulations, namely CO_{2} emissions. No replacement for either Mulsanne or 6¾-litre V8 engine is planned. Instead, the third generation Flying Spur would succeed the Mulsanne as Bentley's flagship model.

== History ==
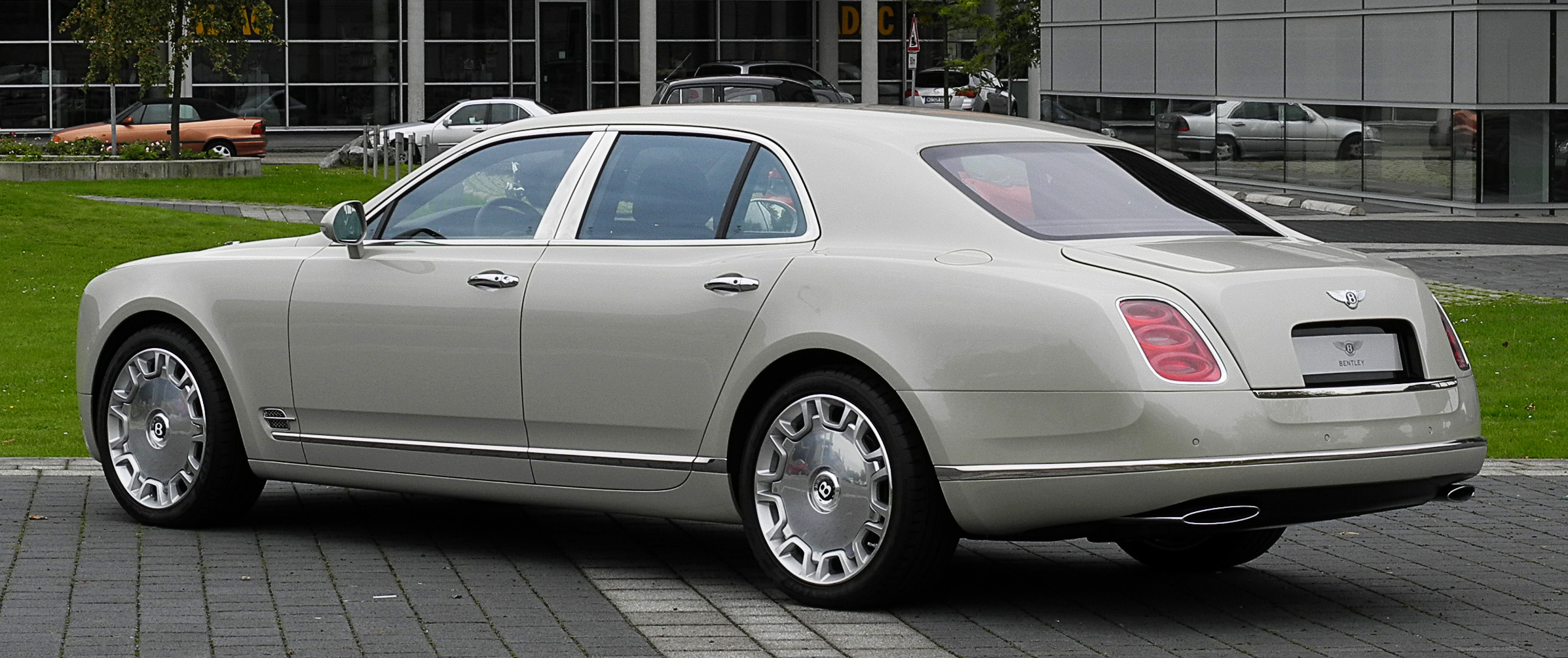
2011 Bentley Mulsanne pre-facelift (Düsseldorf, Germany)

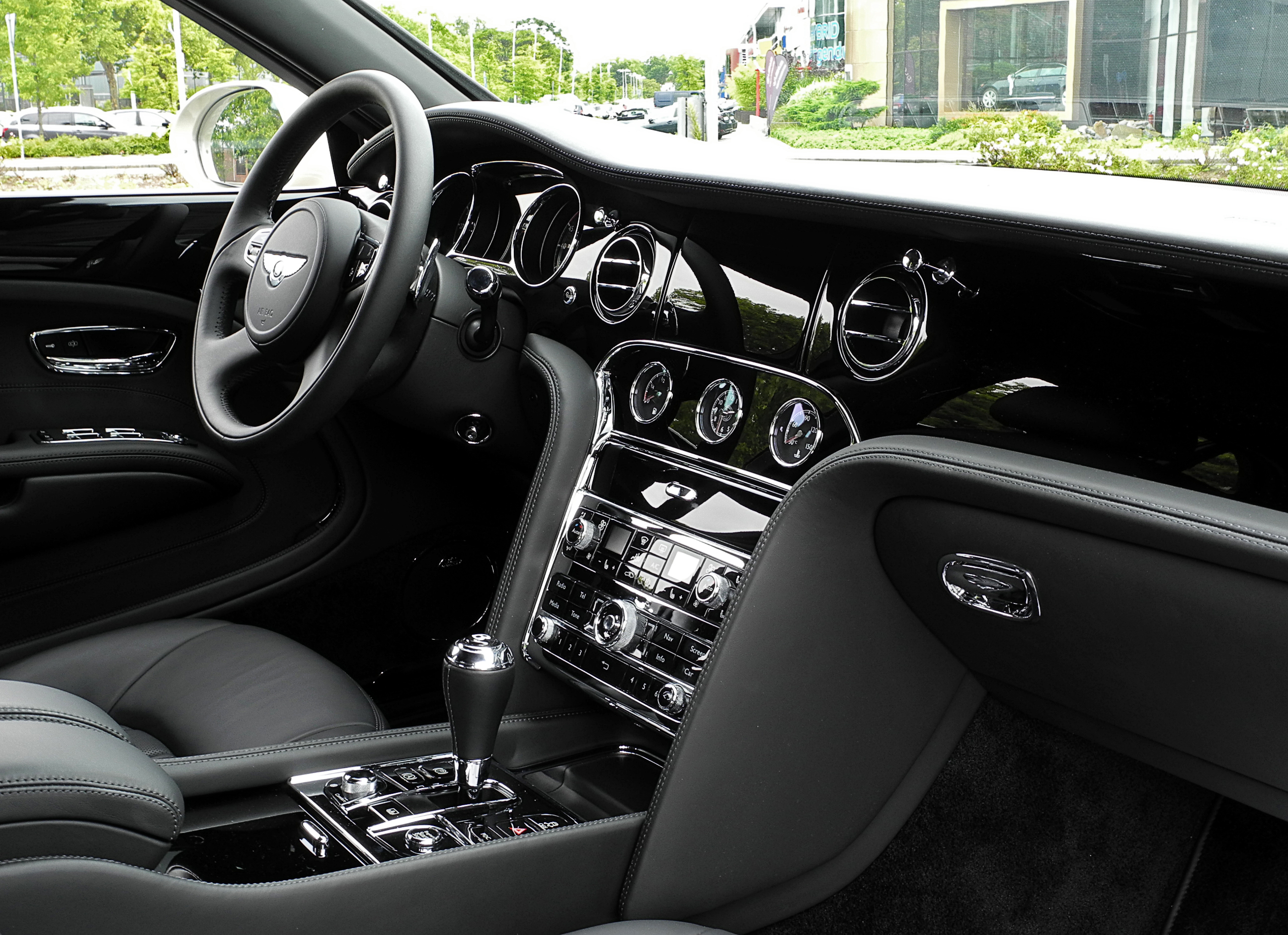
Interior

=== 2005–2009: Development and design ===
The development and design phase of the forthcoming flagship began in June 2005, with initial design concepts written at the Bentley Design studio in Crewe. Developed under the internal codename "Project Kimberley", the name of which was inspired by a diamond found in South Africa, the Mulsanne project represented Bentley's first independently designed and developed car since W. O. Bentley's conception of the 8 Litre in 1930. The car was also the company's first model developed wholly at the Crewe design facility. The inception of the Mulsanne was an unforeseen project, as efforts were initially focused on preserving the Arnage following Volkswagen Group's acquisition of Bentley. At that juncture, there was neither a formalised strategy nor sufficient funding for the replacement of Bentley's flagship with an entirely new vehicle. Originally, (Note: 2005, before the development of the Mulsanne and before the 2005 Continental Flying Spur was released) the upcoming Continental Flying Spur was slated as the successor, but dissatisfaction with this concept prompted Bentley chairman Franz-Josef Paefgen to abruptly discontinue it. He advocated for the development of an entirely new vehicle, preserving two integral elements of the Arnage's design: rear-wheel drive with the front axle centreline optimally positioned forward, and a 6.75-litre push-rod V8 with a twin-turbo system.

In the winter of 2005, three design concepts were selected and transformed into digital form. Alias models were then created, and one-third-scale clay models were milled from the three designs. A presentation to the Bentley board in March 2006 led to two proposals being chosen for full-scale clay models, with the final design freeze occurring in winter 2007. The design team, including senior designer Crispin Marshfield, designer Gareth Thomas, and junior designer Vitalis Enns, spent a year refining the design through a combination of clay and digital iterations. Hand clay modelling was crucial for achieving the desired sculptural quality. Extensive work in CFG and the wind tunnel, along with input from suppliers, led to design tweaks and the creation of full-size GKN data control models. The final selection process by the board in September 2007 resulted in a design freeze, with the two full-scale clays sharing similar features like a shallow V-shaped hood and distinctive locomotive-style shoulders inherited from the 2008 Brooklands coupe.

Throughout its development, one of the team's goals was to construct a heavy vehicle, as part of Bentley's philosophy that the weight of a car is intrinsically linked to its identity, as perceived by customers. Bentley believed that a lighter vehicle would "spoil the driving experience," which British magazine Evo described as a "strange thing to hear from a car company these days". Nevertheless, Paefgen instructed engineers not to surpass the kerb weight of the preceding Arnage. The exterior styling was overseen by a team directed by Belgian designer Dirk van Braeckel, who articulated that the styling drew inspiration from the tradition of historical grand touring Bentleys. Van Braeckel stated that, "from the very first-hand sketches in the styling studio [...] we have sought to evolve this story for a new generation of Bentley enthusiasts". Heading the interior design was British designer Robin Page, who also supervised that of the second-generation Continental GT. Despite being a new model developed and engineered wholly at the Bentley Crewe facility, its engine, the 6¾-litre unit developed with Rolls-Royce, was predominantly carried over from the Arnage. However, modifications were implemented to reduce weight, increase horsepower, and optimise fuel efficiency. The engine revision resulted in a weight loss of 6 kilograms (13 lb) by using a new crankshaft, 130 grams (4.6 oz) per piston and 100 grams (3.5 oz) per conrod. The pistons and gudgeon pins received a coating of diamond-like carbon (DLC), and the piston skirts were coated with graphite. These coatings served to minimise friction and fuel consumption, while also optimising the durability of the components under high engine loads.

=== 2009–2010: Launch ===
Before the launch of the 2009 model, the Mulsanne designation was most recently employed by Bentley to denote a four-door saloon manufactured from 1980 to 1992. Subsequently, it was reinstated as the nomenclature for the successor to the Arnage, which served as Bentley's flagship model at the time. It made its first appearance at the Pebble Beach Concours d'Elegance in 2009, its second at the 2009 Frankfurt Motor Show, its third at the 2010 North American International Auto Show, and its fourth and final at the 2012 Qatar Motor Show. The first Mulsanne produced, with chassis number 00001, was sold in 2009 at the Gooding & Company Pebble Beach auction for US$500,000 (US$550,000 after buyer premium) to an undisclosed bidder. Deliveries in England began in September 2010.

=== Assembly ===
Each individual Mulsanne is hand-built and undergoes a meticulous process spanning approximately 200 hours (16 days). A total of 298 employees are dedicated to each unit, with the collective effort of about 4,000 employees contributing to the completion of all 7,300 Mulsannes. The assembly area covers an extensive 521,111 m^{2} (5,609,190 sq ft), serving as the centre for all aspects of car production. This includes design, research and development, engineering, manufacturing, quality control, as well as operations related to sales and marketing. The first stage of the Mulsanne's assembly process involves its body in white, where Bentley metalworkers perform 5,800 individual welds, joining hundreds of meters of steel and aluminium. Bentley's objective was to render all traces of welds entirely imperceptible, creating the illusion that the body seamlessly originated from a single piece of metal. In specific areas, such as where the roof merges into the rear haunch through the deep D-pillar, a team brazes the joint by hand until it becomes entirely invisible to the human eye, particularly once the vehicle is painted. Customers are offered a choice from a palette of over 120 exterior paint colours from Bentley, or they can opt to create a custom colour, matching it to a precious object if desired. Due to the body's curvature, the paint application requires precise hand spraying at various depths to achieve a smooth and even appearance. Following the lacquering process, each car undergoes fine sanding and is polished with lamb's wool for 12 hours, resulting in a reflective finish, dubbed by Bentley as the "Mirror Finish".

Wood plays a crucial role, forming a foundation of solid walnut, cherry, or oak that runs through the dashboard and doors of the Mulsanne. Exclusive to this model, a solid wood substrate is overlaid with a selection of a dozen different veneers, sourced from sustainable origins globally, with colours ranging from red to brown and black. These veneers often come from century-old exotic trees, including vavona from the US, madrona from the US, olive ash from Europe and Southwest Asia, tamo ash from China, or birds-eye maple from North America. Customers were progressively shifting from curly wood grains to straight grains like eucalyptus from Australia and Spain, koa from or liquid amber from the US. Stone veneers from stone mined in India, formed over 200 million years ago, are often used. Each sheet of wood, derived from the same tree, undergoes a process where the root burl is steamed and cut into 0.6 mm (0.024 in) slices. This ensures that the pattern and colour remain consistent throughout the entire car and age uniformly. Laser-cut veneers are mirror-matched to create 33 separate components. Following sanding, each part receives five layers of lacquer, undergoes a 72-hour curing process, is then sanded and polished again before being fitted to the car.

The Mulsanne undergoes a hand-assembly process in a dedicated build area staffed by 120 employees, distinct from the main assembly hall operating lines for the Bentayga, Continental GT, and Flying Spur models. This intricate process involves connecting 2 mi (3.2 km), 50 kilograms (110 lb) wiring looms, fitting dashboards and steering wheels, marrying engines, adding brake fluids and coolants, assembling matrix grills with front fenders, attaching wheels, bonding windscreens, and installing doors and seats. Every artisan working on a Mulsanne must memorise and possess the skills to complete over 6.5 work hours on the car. With a production rate of nine cars per week, the Mulsanne production line comprises 12 workstations fed by seven sub-assembly/trim areas. Each workstation spends 203 minutes per car, compared to the nine minutes per station for the Continental GT. The Mulsanne is manually moved along the production line. Following this assembly, each vehicle undergoes a visual inspection for quality against a 500 to 650-point checklist before receiving final sign-off.

== Design and features ==
Standard features include 20-inch wheels, air suspension, soft-close doors and trunk, keyless entry and ignition, a sunroof, and parking sensors. Interior highlights include four-zone automatic climate control, heated 14-way power-adjustable front seats, eight-way adjustable rear seats, power rear-window privacy glass, an eight-inch touchscreen infotainment system, and a 14-speaker stereo. Bentley provides a range of packages that adorn the interior of the Mulsanne, along with various customisation options. Exclusive additions, such as a drink cabinet with a bottle cooler, additional vanity mirrors, power curtains, and unique features like special colours, veneers, embroidery, and jewellery boxes, are available for individual preferences. Notable package highlights include: Comfort Specification with massage ventilation, comfort headrests with faux suede pads and two extra loose cushions and reclining seats with footrests similar to those of an aeroplane. The Premier Specification adds the flying B decoration, two umbrellas, a valet key, and a remote-control garage door opener. The Entertainment Specification adds 10.4-inch rear-seating tablets, veneered picnic tables and a Naim sound system. The range-topping Mulliner Driving Specification adds exclusive 21-inch wheels, sport-tuned suspension, perforated seats and door panels and leather trimming.

The Mulsanne offers 443–446 L (15.6–15.8 cu ft) of boot space, a capacity criticised by Motor Trend as below expectations for a vehicle of its size. Safety features include anti-lock brakes (ABS), electronic stability control (ESC), front, side and overhead airbags, seat belt pretensioners, and a vehicle intrusion security system. Its coefficient of drag is 0.33.

== Models ==
=== Mulsanne Speed (2014) ===
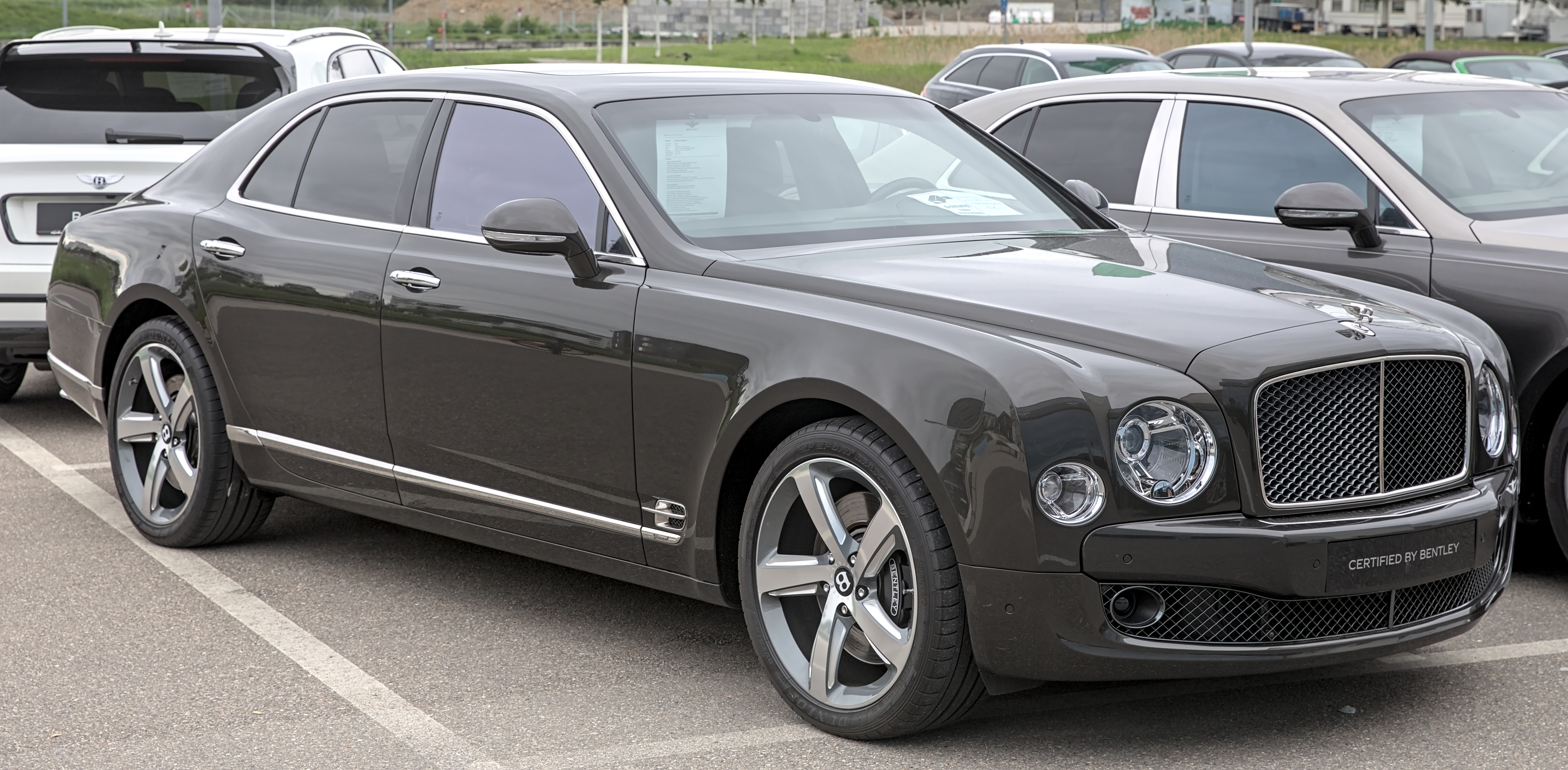

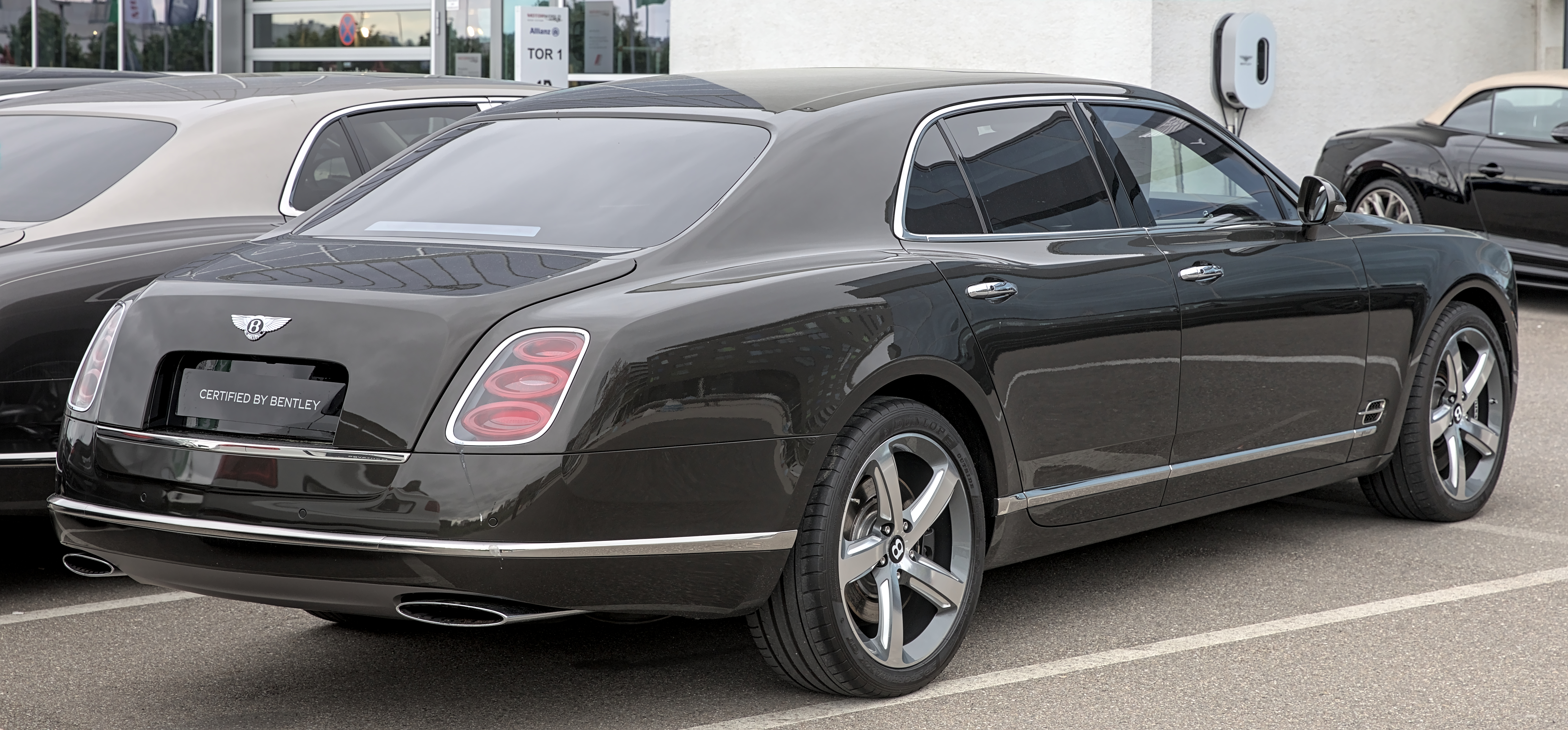
Bentley Mulsanne Speed (pre-facelift, Germany)

The Speed variant of the Mulsanne offers enhanced performance and more features compared to the standard model. Its 6.75-litre twin-turbocharged V8 petrol engine underwent modifications, resulting in an output of 395 kW; 530 hp (537 PS) and 1,100 N⋅m (811 lb⋅ft), in comparison to the standard model's 377 kW; 505 hp (512 PS) and 1,020 N⋅m (752 lb⋅ft).

It benefits from a 13% increase in efficiency as a result of a newly redesigned combustion system that promotes a faster and more controlled combustion process. This gives the Speed a 0–97 km/h (60 mph) acceleration time of 4.8 seconds, which is 0.3 seconds faster than the standard model. Meanwhile, the top speed is increased by about 3.4%, from 296 to 306 km/h (184 to 190 mph). Other features exclusive to the Speed include a Sports mode in the suspension system settings, exterior enhancements like a dark tint finish applied to the stainless steel matrix grille, distinctive headlights, a "floating ellipse" design on the rear taillights, Bentley's first directional-style wheel and tire set, and twin rifled exhaust tailpipes.

Interior features include a "colour split" with new stitch lines that balance diamond quilted light-colour hide with darker, smooth hide, a 60 GB onboard hard drive, electrically-operated tables with recesses and connections for iPads and matching keyboards and a Wi-Fi hotspot.

=== Mulsanne Extended Wheelbase (2016) ===
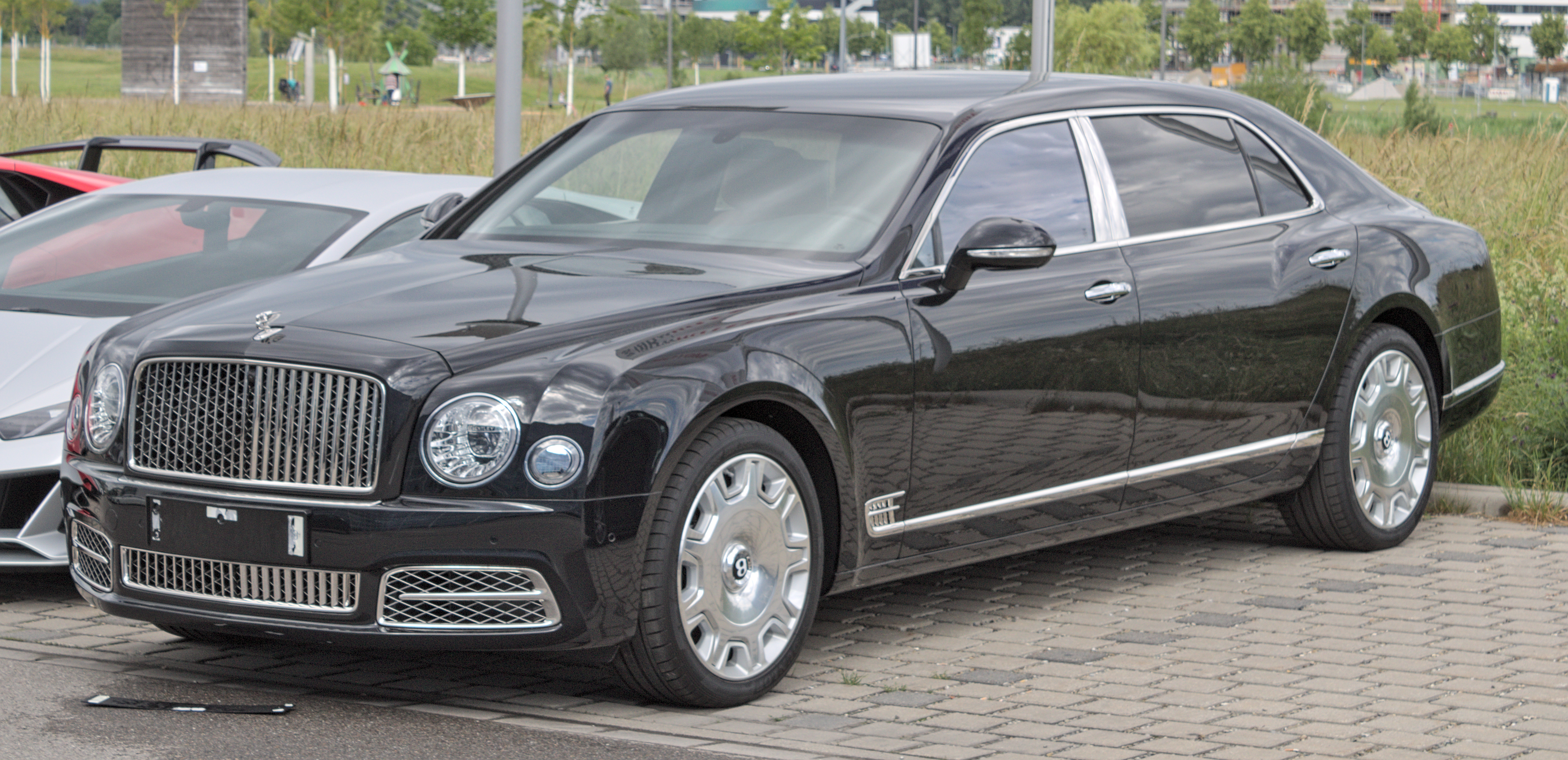
Bentley Mulsanne EWB (facelift; Germany)

Unveiled at the 2016 Geneva Motor Show, the Bentley Mulsanne Extended Wheelbase (EWB) prioritises the rear-seat passenger experience. With an additional 250 mm (10 in) of rear legroom compared to the standard model, the EWB introduces airline-style extending legrests and a rear compartment sunroof. Optional electronic leg rests integrated into the rear seats offer various seating positions, including upright, relaxed, and reclined. The EWB comes standard with a large-format sunroof featuring an Alcantara sunblind, controllable by both passengers and the driver.

The large-format sunroof features an Alcantara sunblind, is standard on the EWB, and can be controlled by the passengers or the driver. An optional centre console, made from veneer, metal, glass and leather, can be ordered to divide the rear seats. The rear seats can also be specified with folding picnic tables. Electric privacy curtains are fitted as standard to the EWB and can be tailored with either a black or ivory-coloured lining. Headrests, Alcantara headrest cushions and a powered Alcantara roller blind are additional options unique to the EWB.

=== Mulsanne Grand Limousine by Mulliner (2016) ===
The Mulsanne Grand Limousine was presented at the 2016 Geneva Motor Show. It is 1,000 millimetres (39 in) longer and has 79 millimetres (3.1 in) more headroom in the back than the standard Mulsanne. Accommodating four passengers in the rear with the addition of two rear-facing seats, the front and rear seats are separated by an electrochromic glass, providing the option to toggle between transparency and opacity. Each seat features its own air conditioning system, ensuring individualised comfort. Bentley announced in 2021 that an additional five examples would be available for sale.

== Special models ==
=== Mulsanne Diamond Jubilee Edition (2012) ===
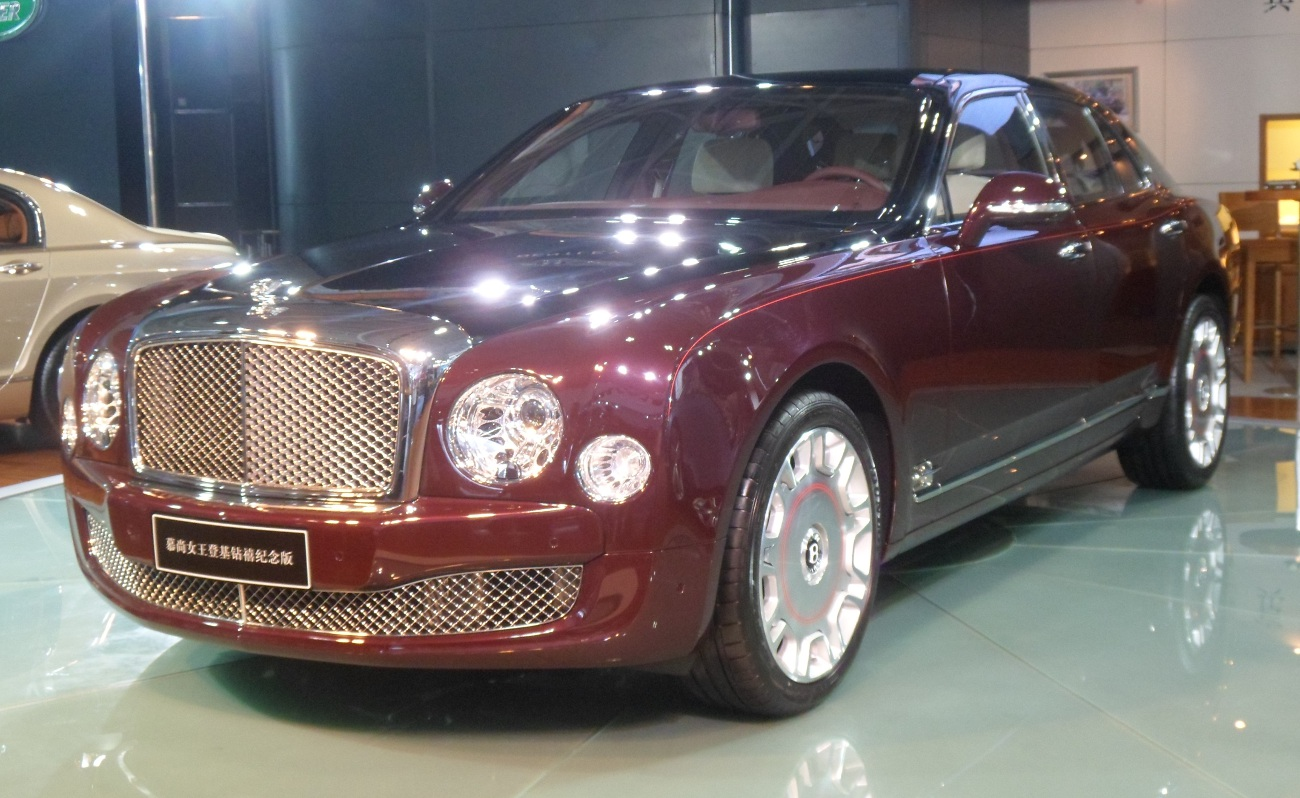
Bentley Mulsanne Diamond Jubilee Edition

The Mulsanne Diamond Jubilee Edition is a limited (60 units) version of the Mulsanne commemorating Queen Elizabeth II's birthday and Diamond Jubilee. Notable changes included bespoke embroidery to all four headrests using gold stitching, veneered picnic tables in the rear cabin decorated with a gold overlay depicting a royal carriage, hide cushions featuring the same motif, polished stainless steel treadplate plaques with 'Bentley Mulliner, England' script and 'Diamond Jubilee Edition'.

The model was unveiled at the Beijing International Automotive Exhibition in Sanlitun district.

=== Mulsanne Executive Interior (2012) ===
The design of the Mulsanne Executive Interior was based on the Mulsanne Executive Interior Concept. The car is offered in two specifications, Theatre and iPad. The iPad Specification includes 2 electrically-deployed veneered picnic tables for rear passengers (colour-matched to the seats of the Mulsanne) and two iPads with wireless keyboards. Mulsanne Theatre Specification includes a 15.6-inch centrally located HD LED screen or 8-inch screens fitted within the front seat headrests and a boot-mounted Apple Mac computer.

The Mulsanne Executive Interior with iPad Specification was unveiled at the 2012 Moscow International Auto Salon.

=== Mulsanne Le Mans Edition (2013) ===
The Mulsanne Le Mans Edition is a limited version (48 units per model) of the Mulsanne for the North American market, commemorating Bentley's six victories at the 24 Hours of Le Mans. Each car included a unique Le Mans Edition numbered badge, Le Mans Edition clock face, embroidered Le Mans badge to each headrest, tread plates with the limited edition name, unique Le Mans Edition wheels and specific interior veneers and exterior colours. The LeMans Edition consisted of six models, named after the winning drivers:

Model	Exterior	Interior	Stitching	Veneer
John Duff	Moonbeam	Two-tone Linen and Beluga	Contrast	Piano Black and Bright Aluminium
Dudley Benjafield	Verdant	Two-tone Linen and Cumbrian Green	Contrast	Dark Stain Burr Walnut and Bright Aluminium
Woolf Barnato	Granite	Hotspur	Beluga	Dark Stain Burr Walnut with Dark Aluminium
Tim Birkin	Glacier White	Beluga	White	Piano Black and Bright Aluminium
Glen Kidston	Dark Sapphire	Two-tone Newmarket Tan and Imperial Blue	Contrast	Dark Stain Burr Walnut and Dark Aluminium
Guy Smith	Beluga	Beluga	Hotspur	Piano Black and Dark Aluminium

The models were unveiled at the 2013 Pebble Beach Concours d'Elegance and went on sale in third quarter of 2013.

=== Mulsanne Shaheen (2013) ===
The Shaheen is a Limited Edition version of the Bentley Mulsanne equipped with the Mulliner Driving Specification as standard. The Shaheen was unveiled at the 2013 Dubai Motor Show and specifically developed for the Middle East market, with design details inspired by the Shaheen eagle, a bird of prey found in the Middle East. Changes include Tungsten over Onyx paintwork inspired by the colourings of the Shaheen eagle, Magnolia and Beluga leather interior upholstery, Dark Stained Burr Walnut Veneer, a bespoke signature Mulsanne Shaheen logo on the rear iPad picnic tables using a gold overlay, iPad picnic tables, a Wi-Fi hotspot, a large tilt-opening tinted glass sunroof, and an electrically operated bottle cooler.

=== Mulsanne Seasons Collector's Editions (2013) ===
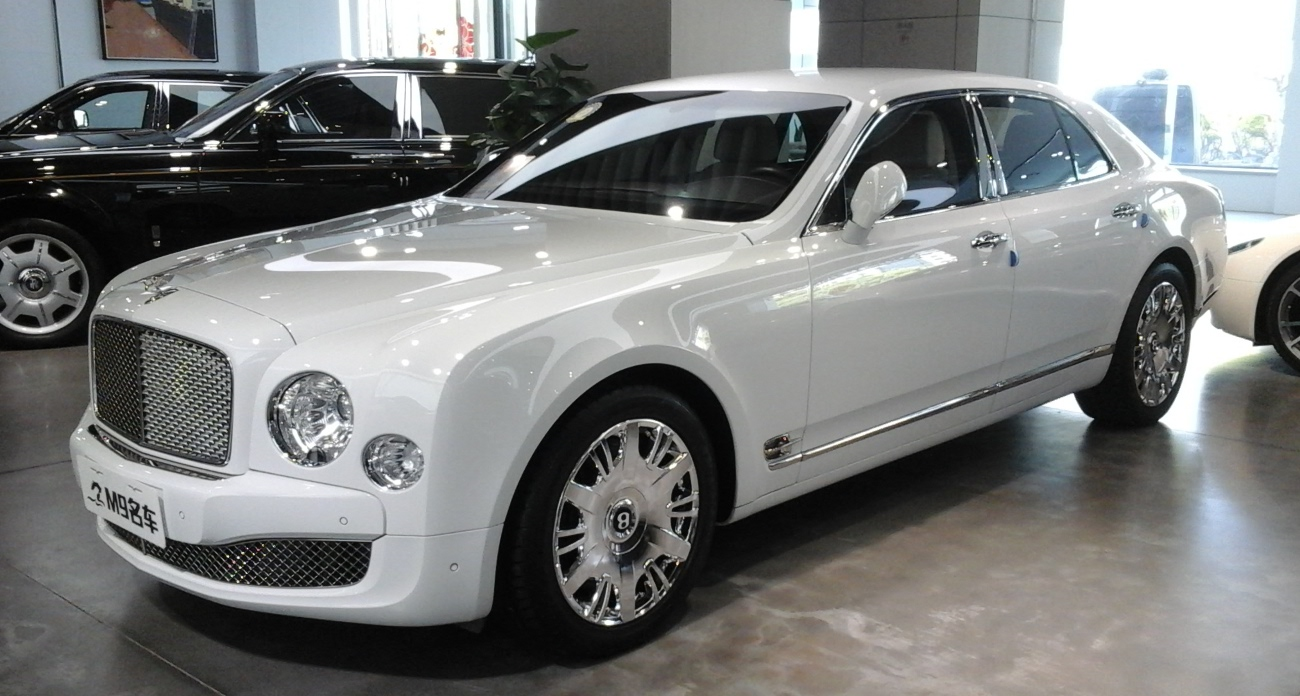
Mulsanne Seasons Collector Editions-Chrysanthemum model

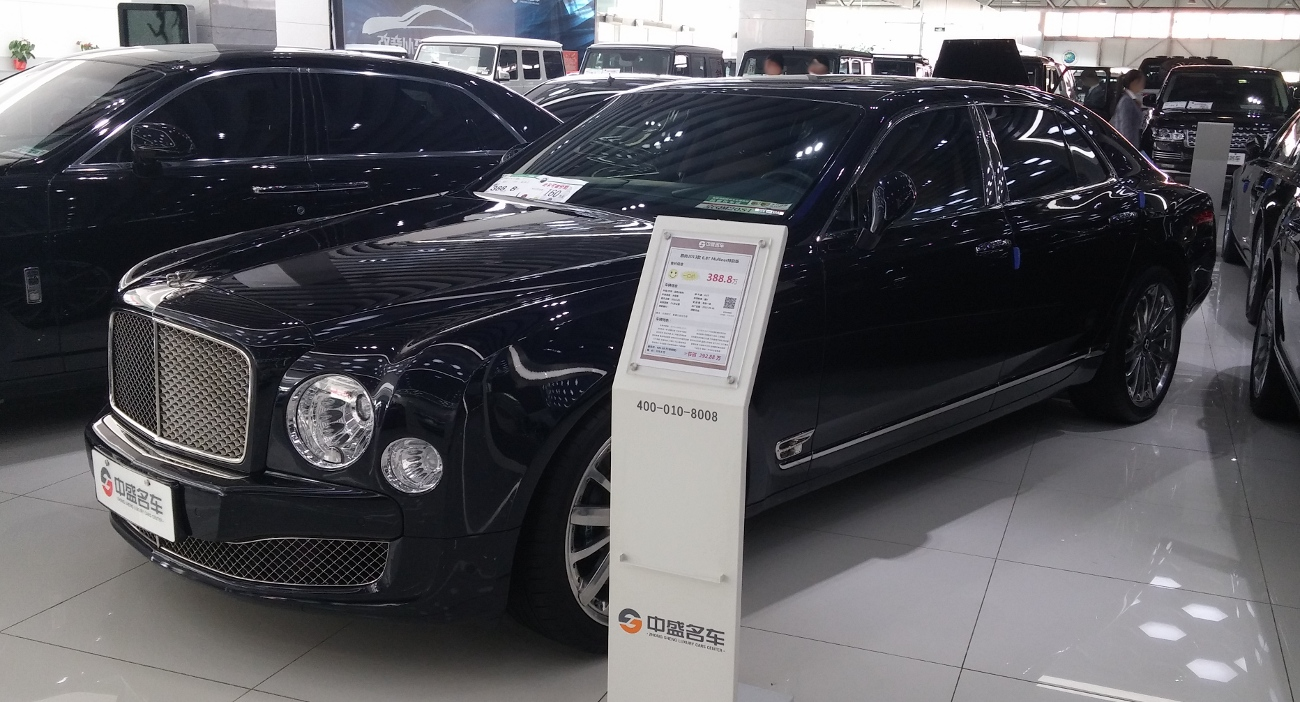
Mulsanne Seasons Collector Editions-Plum blossom model

The Mulsanne Seasons Collector's Editions (慕尚四季臻藏版) are limited (10 units for each of orchids (Spring), bamboo (Summer), chrysanthemums (Autumn), and plum (Winter); 1 unit for Golden Pine (Whole Year Edition)) versions of 2014 Bentley Mulsanne with Mulliner Driving Specification for China market, inspired China's culture. Designed with Lin Xi's interpretation of the Chinese 'Four Seasons', all models include 21-inch Mulliner Polished Wheel, twin picnic tables. Each model includes a season-specific theme (except Golden Pine):

Model	Background veneer	plant	Paint	Main Hide	Secondary Hide	Contrast Cross Stitching	Emblem Stitching	Steering Wheel	Veneer	Marquetry	Treadplate
Golden Pine (Whole Year Edition/四季臻华款)	Cluster Oak + Iridescent Finish (boot), Brown Oak Burr (foliage)	Sword Shape Abalone	Antique Gold over Dark Antique Gold	Shortbread	Damson	Damson	Damson	Duo Tone	Cluster Oak Veneer with Iridescent Finish	'Pine Tree' inlay marquetry to front passenger fascia	'Golden Pine' Treadplate
Orchid (Spring/春沐款)	Cluster Oak + Iridescent Finish	Ripple Sycamore Olive Green & Bolivar Mid Green (leaves), Maple (stem), Swiss Pear (petal), Purple Heart (Petal accents), Boxwood & Ash Burr (Flower Centres)	Windsor Blue	Imperial Blue	Imperial Blue	Kingfisher	Kingfisher	Single tone	Birds Eye Maple	'Orchid' inlay marquetry to front passenger fascia	'Orchid' Treadplates
Bamboo (Summer/夏颂款)	BIRDS EYE MAPLE	Bolivar Mid Green (leaves), Beech Green (Leaf Highlights), Ripple Sycamore Green (Stems)	Rubino Red	Twine	Fireglow	Fireglow	Fireglow	Duotone	Birds Eye Maple	'Bamboo' inlay marquetry to front passenger fascia	'Bamboo' Treadplates
Chrysanthemum (Autumn/秋逸款)	DARK MADRONA	Ripple Sycamore Green + shading (leaves), Ripple Sycamore Green (stem), Ripple sycamore (petal), Birds Eye maple pink (bud)	Ghost White	Beluga	Beluga	Linen	Linen	Singletone	Dark Burr Madrona (special)	'Chrysanthemum' inlay marquetry to front passenger fascia	'Chrysanthemum' Treadplates
Plum blossom (Winter/冬魅款)	DARK MADRONA	Birds eye maple brown (branch), American walnut burr (Branch Shadows), Ripple Sycamore (Blossom), Tulipwood burr (Stamen)	Black Crystal	Damson	Damson	Linen	Linen	Singletone	Dark Burr Madrona (special)	'Plum Blossom' inlay marquetry to front passenger fascia	'Plum Blossom' Treadplates

The vehicles were unveiled at the 2013 Guangzhou International Auto Show. The Golden Pine car was sold for 8,880,000 yuan, while other models were sold for 6,880,000 yuan.

=== Birkin Edition Mulsanne (2014) ===
The Birkin Edition is a Limited Edition model of the Bentley Mulsanne equipped with the Mulliner Driving Specification and Entertainment Specification (twin 8-inch LCD screens in the rear of the seat headrests, a DVD player, a Wi-Fi hotspot, the Naim for Bentley audio system and iPads integrated into the hand-crafted solid wood picnic tables) as standard. The Birkin Edition was inspired by Sir Henry 'Tiger' Tim Birkin and limited to 22 units exclusively for the European market. Other features specific to this model include a choice of 3 body colour schemes (Ghost White, Damson, and a contrast of Fountain Blue and Dark Sapphire), numbered door sill plaques, a 21-inch wheel design inspired by those on the original Mulsanne concept car, a 3D 'Flying B' logo stitched into the vehicle headrests and inlaid into the wood of the front fascia and rear picnic tables, a luggage set individually numbered and hand-crafted to match with the interior of each car.

=== Mulsanne 95 (2014) ===
The 95 is a Limited Edition version of the Bentley Mulsanne developed to celebrate the company's 95th anniversary, and limited to 15 units reserved for the UK market. Exterior colour options unique to the 95 include Britannia Blue, Empire Red or Oxford White over an interior of blue and white two-tone leather divided by red stitching. Other features specific to this model include the words 'Ninety Five' joined by Union Jack Flags on illuminated treadplates, the number '95’ is also embroidered onto the front and rear seats, the Flying 'B' bonnet mascot with a darker tint, and wood veneer that Bentley claims is sourced from a fallen walnut tree aged between 300 and 400 years old.

=== Mulsanne Speed "Blue Train" Edition (2015) ===
The "Blue Train" is a Limited Edition version of the Bentley Mulsanne Speed created to celebrate the 1930 Bentley Speed Six coupé that outran the so-called "Blue Train" Calais-Mediterranée Express from Cannes to Calais, going so far as to return to London four minutes before the train reached the English Channel. A total of four Bentley Mulsanne Speed "Blue Train" models would be built, in celebration of the four-minute victory. Two of the cars were rendered in Beluga (solid black) and the other two cars were open to custom paint schemes. Other features specific to this model include 21-inch black wheels with polished centres, a chrome grille surround with a black square-mesh insert evocative of the original Blue Train, a Bentley Driver's Club badge fixed to the grille, a retractable Flying 'B' engraved with the words "Blue Train 85 Years", Burnt Oak and Camel leather, door stitch patterns that mimic the original car, sill plates and headrests showcasing the original car's silhouette, and a rendering of the original car in the burr walnut passenger-side wood veneer. The first production unit featured a unique picnic set, trimmed with the same two-tone leathers as the interior of the car, containing Robbe & Berking silver cutlery, Haviland Limoges porcelain, 'champagne flutes', and an Angora picnic rug. The Mulliner team handcrafted the leather cutlery holders as well as the leather rug holder which featured "Blue Train" embroidery. The picnic set was offered as an option for the other three cars.

=== Mulsanne W.O. Edition (2018–2020) ===
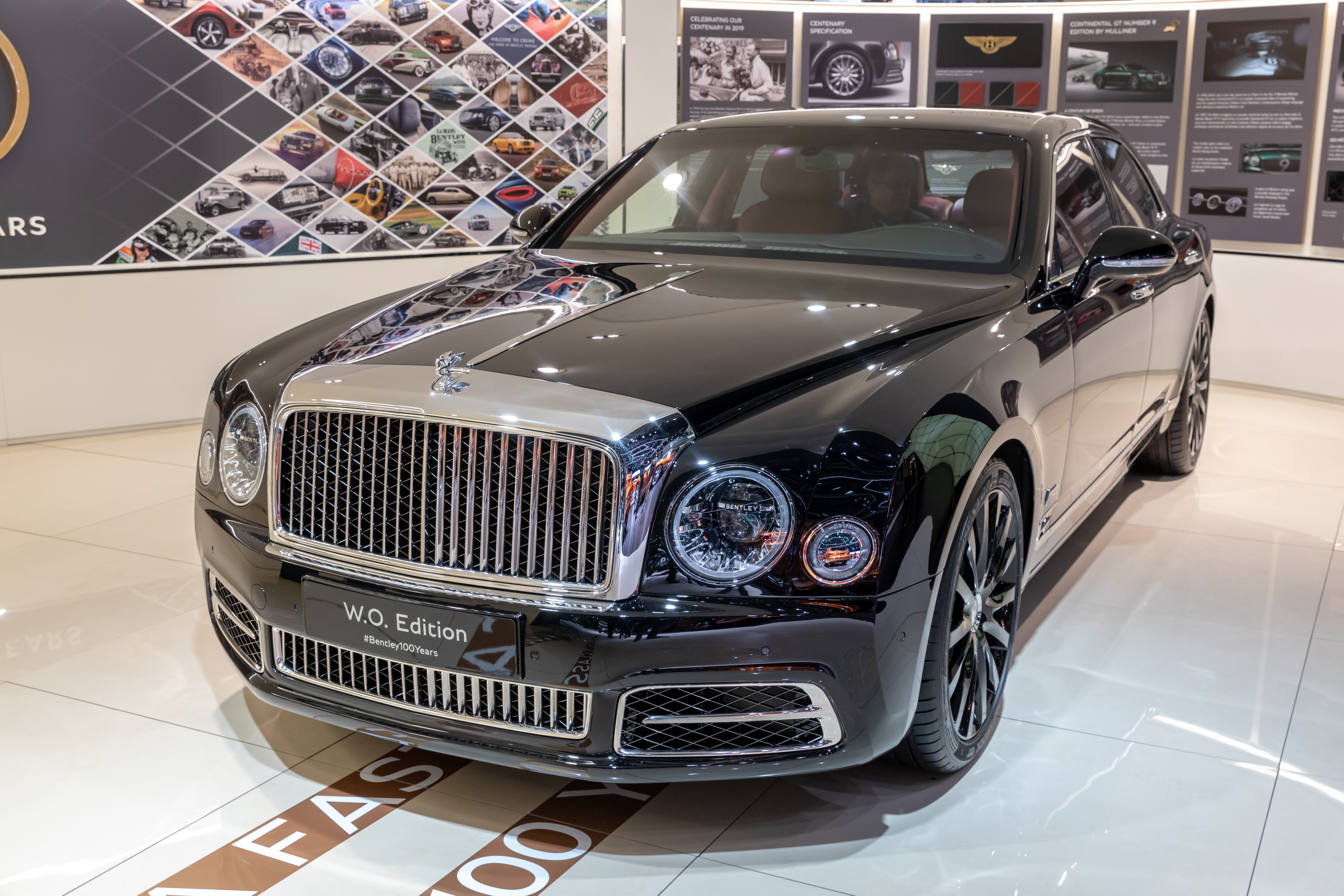
2018 Bentley Mulsanne W.O. Edition

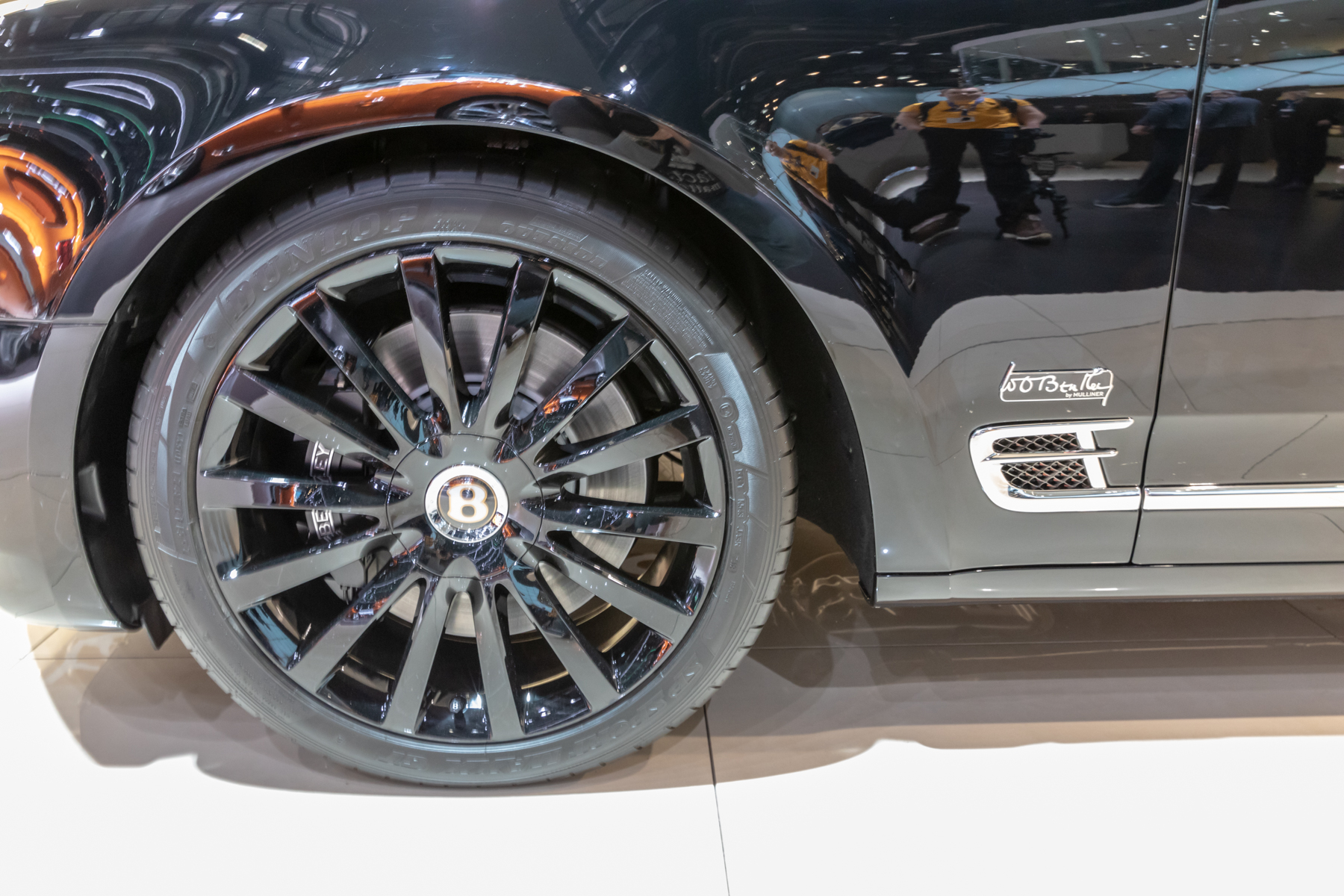
W.O Bentley Signature and the rim system

The Mulsanne W.O. Edition was presented at the 2018 Geneva Motor Show as a 100th anniversary celebration of the founding of Bentley Motors by W.O. Bentley. Designed by Mulliner, each W.O. Edition is claimed to feature a piece of the crankshaft from W.O. Bentley's personal car, displayed in the arm rest in an integrated display case. The interior is upholstered in leather, and the dashboard contains the owner's signature. The signature is also present on the front bumper, and special badges are located on the sills and wheel centres.

The exterior colour scheme is reminiscent of the Bentley 8 Litre, and features a two-tone paint scheme with chrome present on the radiator grille and bonnet strip. Production is limited to 100 units.

=== Mulsanne 6.75 Edition by Mulliner (2020) ===
Bentley unveiled the final edition of the Mulsanne called the "Mulsanne 6.75 Edition by Mulliner" which is limited to 30 units. This model marks the end of the Mulsanne production, the end of the Mulsanne as Bentley's flagship model, and the end of the world's longest continuously produced V8 engine, spanning 60 years.

== Concept cars ==
=== Executive Interior Concept (2011) ===
The Mulsanne Executive Interior Concept is a version of the Mulsanne demonstrating a new multimedia connectivity concept. It included two electric-powered, foldable wood veneer picnic tables in the rear cabin, each with Apple iPad and Apple Bluetooth keyboards; Apple Mac Mini stored in boot compartment, roof console with 15.6 in (396 mm) High Definition LED dropdown monitor, illuminated rear centre console fitted with twin individual armrests, rear console with Apple iPod (control panel), two cup holders, tissue box and large stowage area; Apple iPod controls (Rear Seat Entertainment (RSE) and audio system, Apple Media Centre, plays music and access to internet), 2 USB connectors provided for the Apple system and one Apple interface connector for the iPod, control keys on rear console operate picnic tables, reading lights, control HD LED screen and select video and audio options; Armrest with Tibaldi pen and 'Privacy Telephone handset', bottle cooler in rear centre console with illuminated double-glazed frosted glass door, additional multi-directional reading lights provided for each rear passenger and can be operated with Apple devices, mood lighting in the rear centre console (using multiple soft glowing LEDs), illuminated docking station and cup holders.

The vehicle was unveiled at the 2011 Los Angeles Auto Show.

=== Mulsanne Grand Convertible Concept (2014) ===
The Bentley Grand Convertible is a four-seat, luxury convertible concept car from Bentley Motors. The car debuted at the 2014 LA Auto Show.

== Specifications ==
=== Engines ===
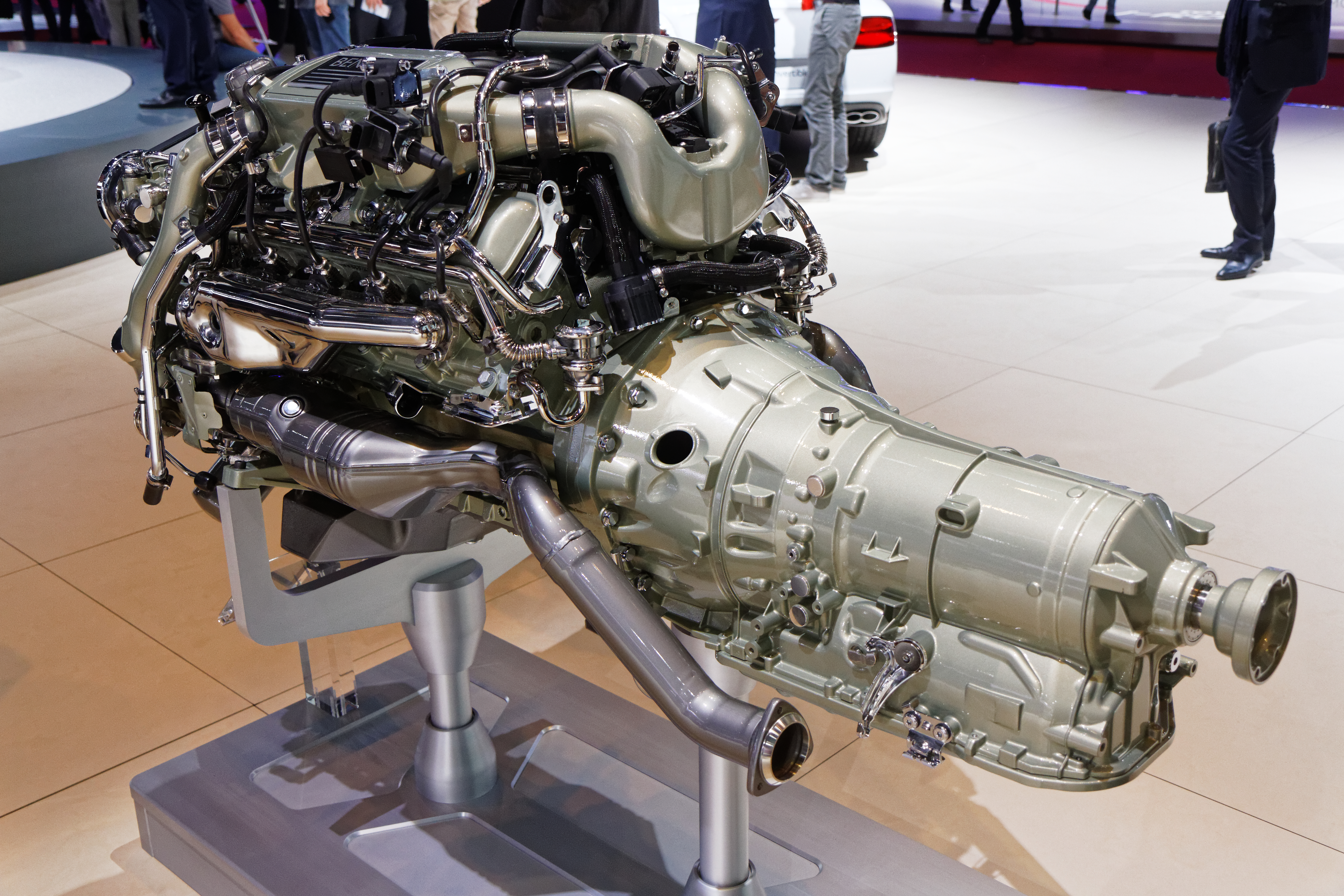
The Bentley Mulsanne's twin turbocharged V8 engine

Petrol engines
Model	Years	Type/code	Power at rpm, Torque at rpm	CO_{2} emission (g/km)
Mulsanne	2010–2020	6,752 cc (412.0 cu in) V8 twin turbo	512 PS (377 kW; 505 hp) at 4,200 rpm, 1,020 N⋅m (752 lb⋅ft) at 1,750 rpm	350
Mulsanne Speed	2014–2020	6,752 cc (412.0 cu in) V8 twin turbo	537 PS (395 kW; 530 hp) at 4,200 rpm, 1,100 N⋅m (811 lb⋅ft) at 1,750 rpm	350

=== Transmissions ===
Petrol engines
Model	Years	Types
Mulsanne	2010–2020	8-speed ZF automatic with electronic shift interface, 'sport mode' and steering wheel mounted paddleshift

== Production and marketing ==
Production of the Mulsanne began at the Crewe plant in spring 2010 and ended in summer 2020. Each car took about 400 hours to produce.

The 6¾-litre V8 engine is built at the Crewe plant, and takes nearly 30 hours to build.

As part of Mulsanne Seasons Collector's Editions launch, Breitling SA produced a Breitling for Bentley B04 GMT Mulsanne wrist watch. During the Mulsanne Seasons Collector's Editions launch in 2013 Guangzhou International Auto Show, the 1000th Chinese customer for Bentley Mulsanne was announced.

Year	Production
2010	354
2011	1,146
2012	1,169
2013	1,117
2014	884
2015	919
2016	628
2017	595
2018	547
2019	443
2020	127
Total	7,929

== Motorsport ==
A Mulsanne competed in the 2012 Goodwood Festival of Speed hill climb.

A Mulsanne was used as the 2012 Nürburgring 24 Hour Race official parade car.
