= Bentley EXP 9 F =

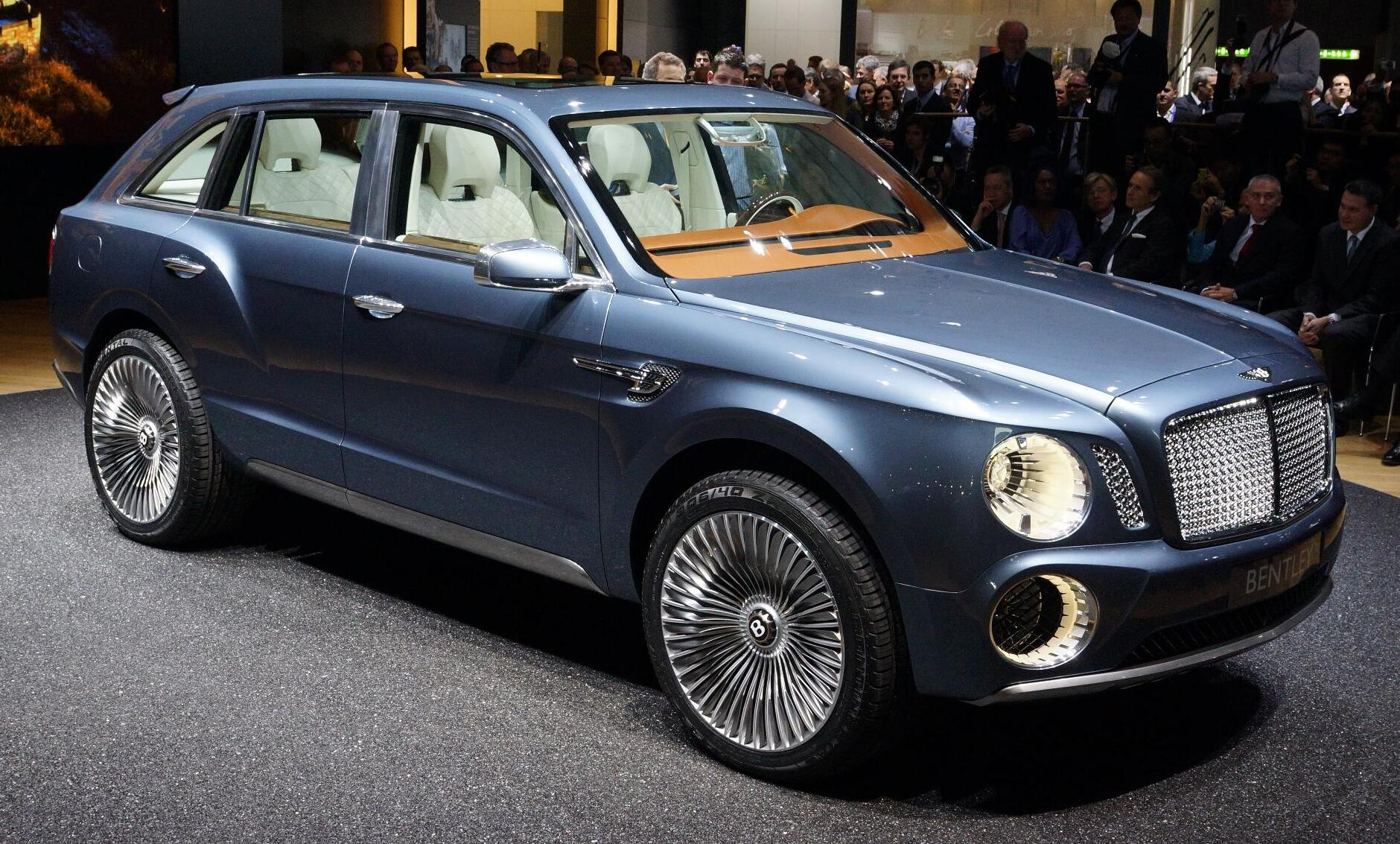

Overview
- Manufacturer: Bentley
- Production: 2012 ( concept car)
- Designer: Dirk van Braeckel

Body and chassis
- Body style: 5-door SUV
- Related: Bentley Bentayga

Powertrain
- Engine: 6.0 L twin-turbo W12

The Bentley EXP 9 F is a concept car produced by Bentley and first shown to the public at the 2012 Geneva Motor Show. It evolved into the production Bentayga SUV.

A luxury SUV capable of seating four adults, the concept was designed by Dirk van Braeckel and developed by Bentley Crewe's based design department. The concept is powered by a re-engineered version of the existing 6.0-litre petrol W12 engine, but in production could also be available with a V8 diesel engine or a V6-based plug-in hybrid powertrain. It is based on the Volkswagen Group PL71 platform, the same platform used in the other Volkswagen Group large SUVs including the Audi Q7, Porsche Cayenne and Volkswagen Touareg.

In July 2013, Bentley announced the production of an SUV model for 2016, based on the next-generation Volkswagen Group large SUV platform. Called Bentayga, Bentley's first production SUV was the company's fourth model alongside the Continental GT, Flying Spur, and the Mulsanne.

== Gallery ==
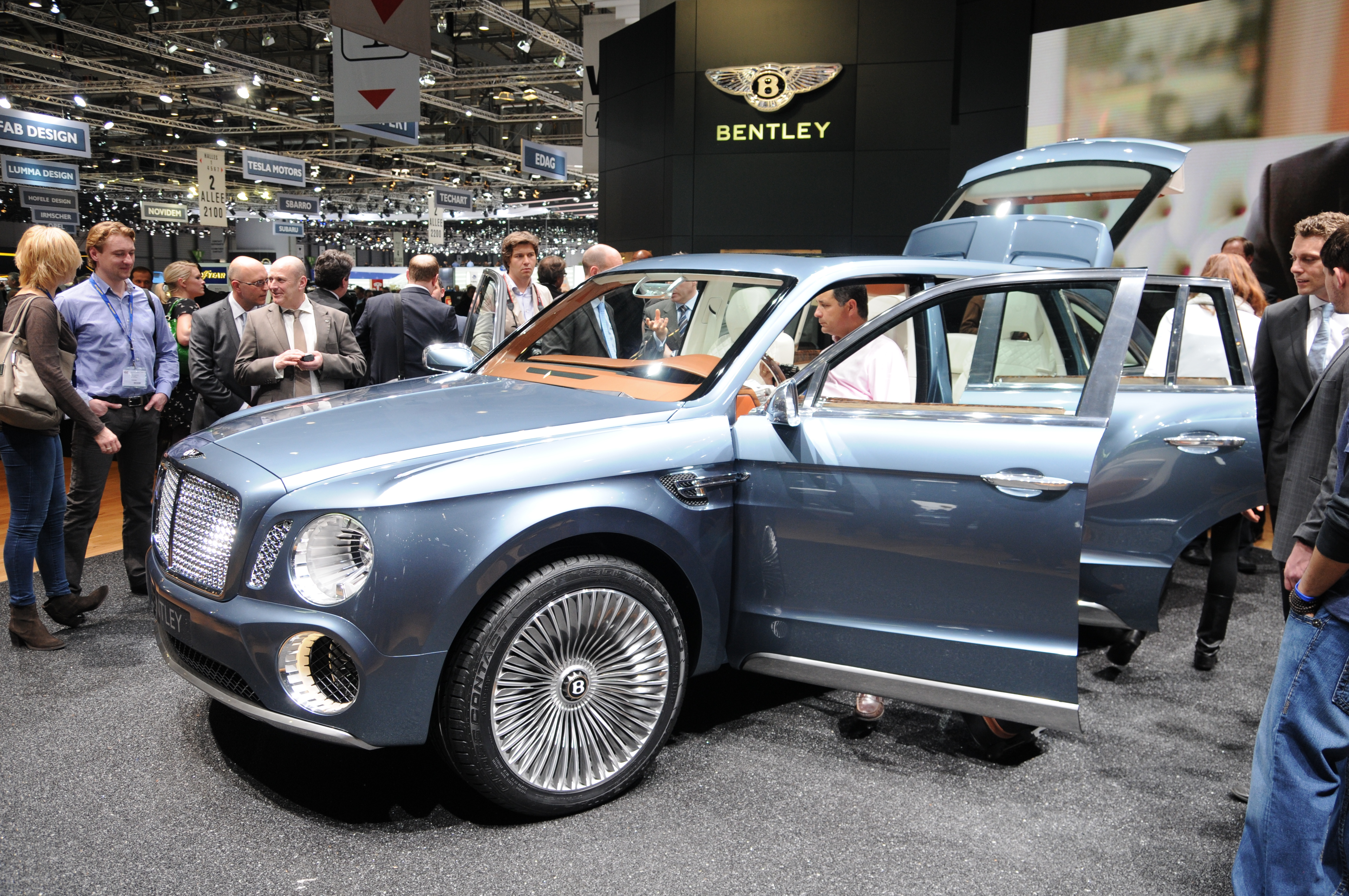
EXP 9 F at the 2012 Geneva Motor Show
