= Bentley Arnage =

British luxury car

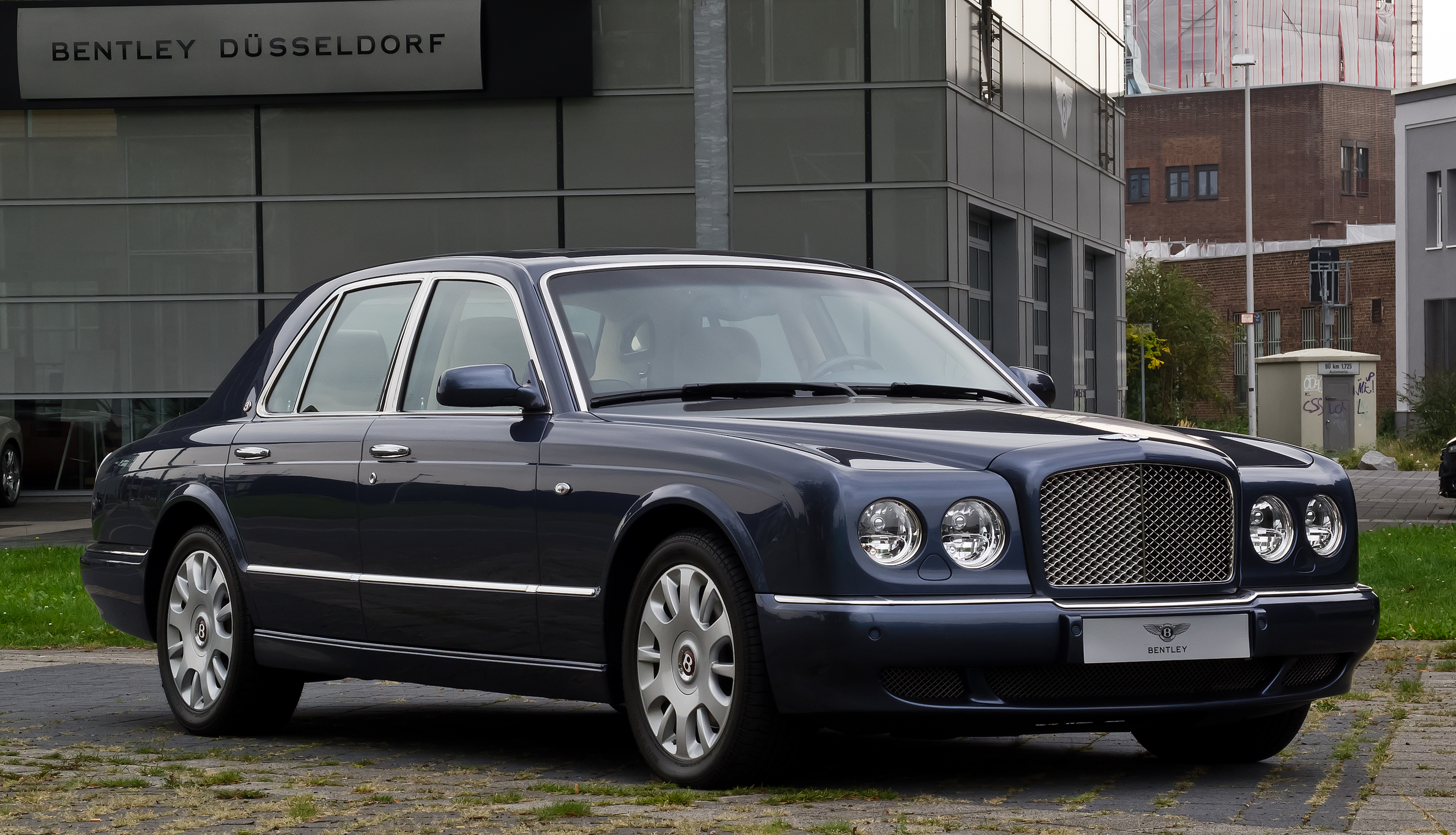
- Bentley Arnage R (facelift)

Overview
- Manufacturer: Bentley Motors
- Production: 1998–2009
- Model years: 1999–2010 (according to late Final Series VINs)
- Assembly: United Kingdom: Crewe (Bentley Crewe)
- Designer: Steve Harper under Graham Hull (1991)

Body and chassis
- Class: Full-size luxury car (F)
- Body style: 4-door saloon/sedan
- Layout: Front-engine, rear-wheel-drive
- Related: Rolls-Royce Silver Seraph; Bentley Azure; Bentley Brooklands Coupé; Bentley State Limousine

Powertrain
- Engine: 4.4 L BMW M62 twin-turbo V8 (1998–2000); 6.75 L L-series turbo/twin-turbo V8 (1999–2006); 6.75 L L-series twin-turbo V8 (2006–2010)
- Transmission: 1999–2006: 4-speed GM 4L80-E automatic; 1998–2000: 5-speed ZF 5HP30 automatic; 2006–2010: 6-speed ZF 6HP-26 automatic

Dimensions
- Wheelbase: 3,116 mm (122.7 in) (Pre-facelift models); 3,116–3,366 mm (122.7–132.5 in) (Post-facelift models)
- Length: 5,394 mm (212.4 in) (Pre-facelift models); 5,400–5,640 mm (212.6–222.0 in) (Post-facelift models)
- Width: 1,932 mm (76.1 in) (Pre-facelift models); 1,900 mm (74.8 in) (Post-facelift models)
- Height: 1,516 mm (59.7 in) (Pre-facelift models); 1,515 mm (59.6 in) (Post-facelift models)
- Kerb weight: Green Label: 2,320 kg (5,120 lb); Arnage R: 2,585 kg (5,699 lb); 2007 facelift models: 2,585–2,655 kg (5,699–5,853 lb)

Chronology
- Predecessor: Bentley Brooklands; Bentley Turbo RT
- Successor: Bentley Mulsanne (for Arnage R/T (SWB) / Arnage R/L (EWB) and Arnage "Final Series"); Bentley Flying Spur

The Bentley Arnage is a full-size luxury car manufactured by Bentley Motors in Crewe, England, and marketed from 1998 to 2009. The Arnage and its Rolls-Royce-branded sibling, the Silver Seraph, were introduced in the spring of 1998. They were the first entirely new designs for the two marques since 1980.

In September 2008, Bentley announced that production of the model would end during 2009. A replacement model, the Bentley Mulsanne was launched in August 2009 at the Pebble Beach Concours d'Elegance.

== Development ==
Following an uplift in sales for all of Rolls-Royce, and a resurgence of the Bentley marque, the then-owner, Vickers, set about developing a new model to replace the derivatives of the Rolls-Royce Silver Spirit/Bentley Mulsanne which it had been selling since 1980. In a complete switch from tradition, these new cars would have engines provided by a third-party vendor, and bodies built at the Crewe factory.

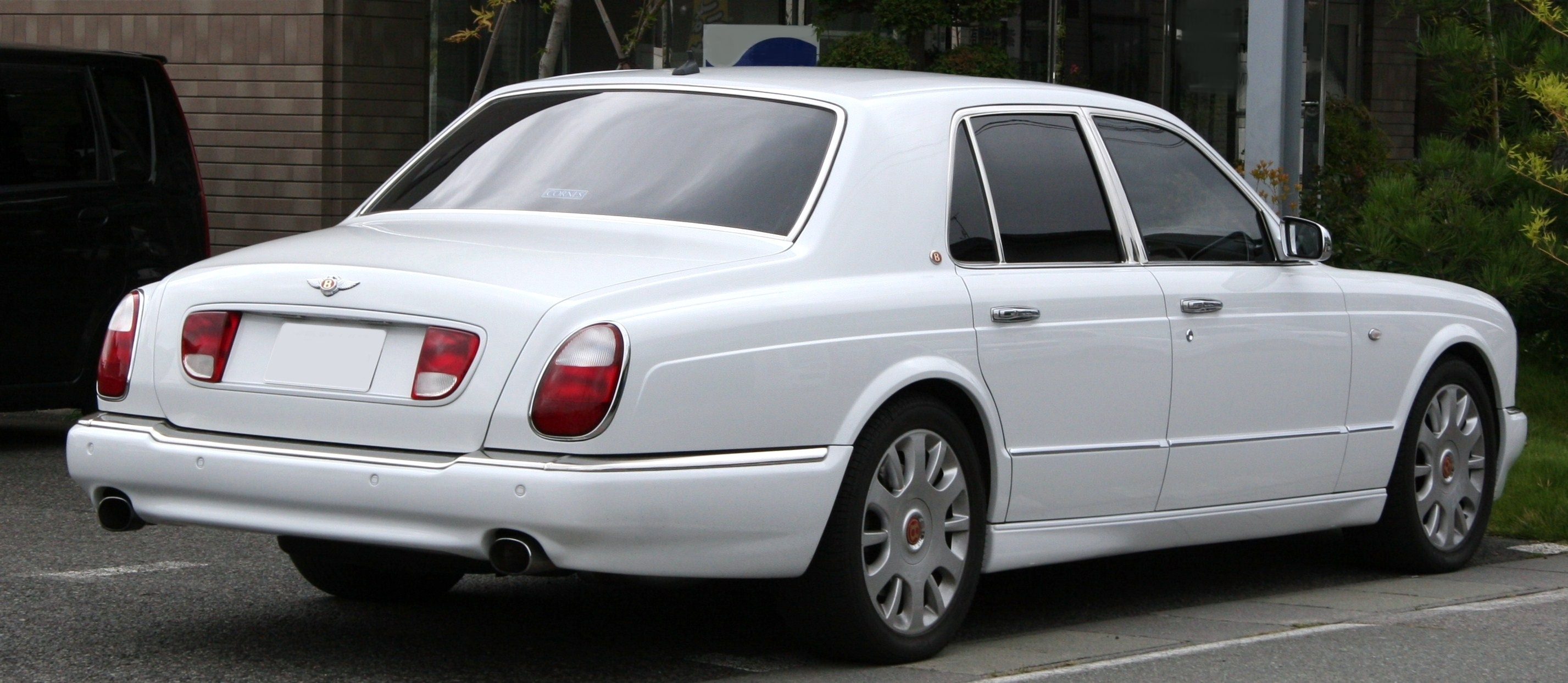
Rear 3/4 view

A number of potential engines were examined, including the Cadillac Northstar engine and the Mercedes-Benz M119 engine. By late 1994, Vickers had selected a pair of BMW power plants. It was decided that the Rolls-Royce model, to be called the Silver Seraph, would use BMW's M73 V12 engine while the more-sporty Bentley model would use a twin-turbocharged version of the 4.4-litre M62 V8 engine developed by Vickers subsidiary Cosworth Engineering. It produced 354 PS (260 kW; 349 hp) and 420 lb⋅ft (569 N⋅m)

=== Red Label and Green Label ===
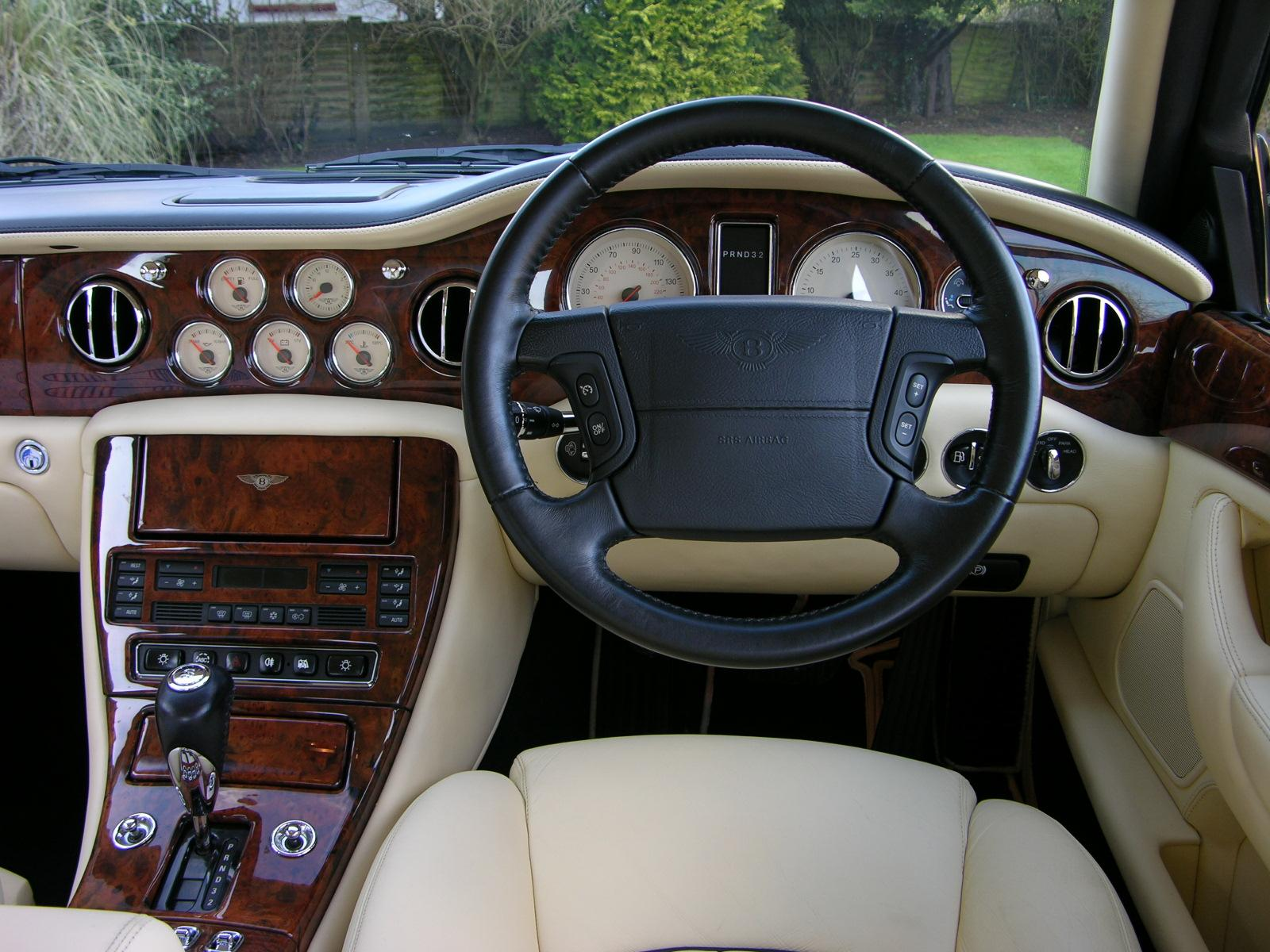
Interior

During the takeover battle in 1998 between BMW and Volkswagen Group for ownership of Rolls-Royce and Bentley Motors, BMW had threatened to stop supply of their engines if Volkswagen Group won. While the threat was later withdrawn in conjunction with BMW acquiring the right to manufacture Rolls-Royce automobiles at a new location, it was clear that Volkswagen could not accept the business and reputation risks associated with having their rival as a long-term business partner. Furthermore, customers were uncertain about engine and part availability (of which there turned out to be no issue) and orders for new cars dropped precipitously.

Volkswagen's response was to adapt the drivetrain from the preceding Turbo R for the Arnage body, which had been designed for the smaller and lighter BMW 32-valve V8. The 6.75 litre Rolls-Royce L410 V8 engine, coupled with a 4-speed 4L80-E automatic gearbox was extremely thirsty, and would not meet government-imposed emissions standards without hasty modifications.

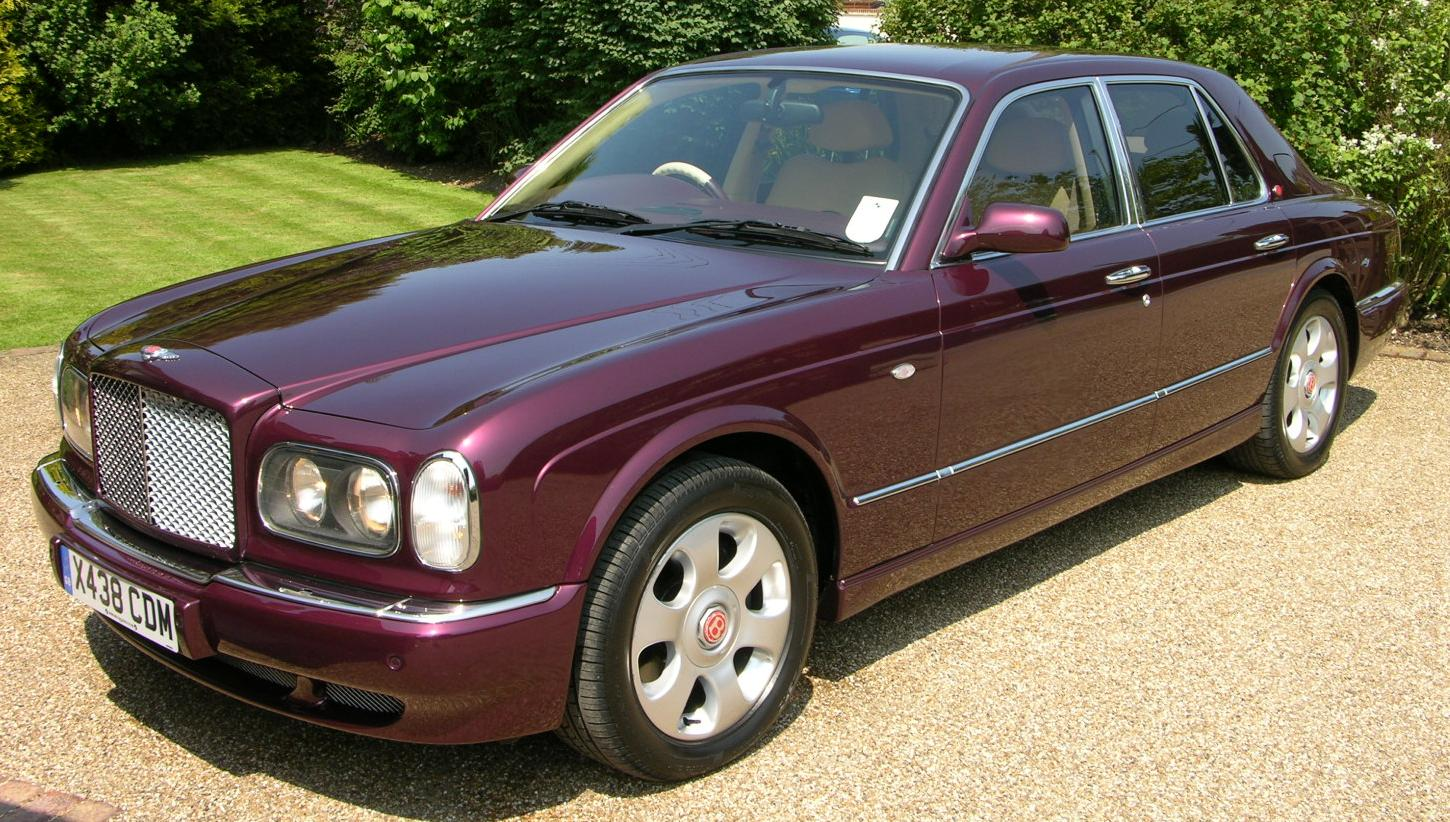
Bentley Arnage Red Label

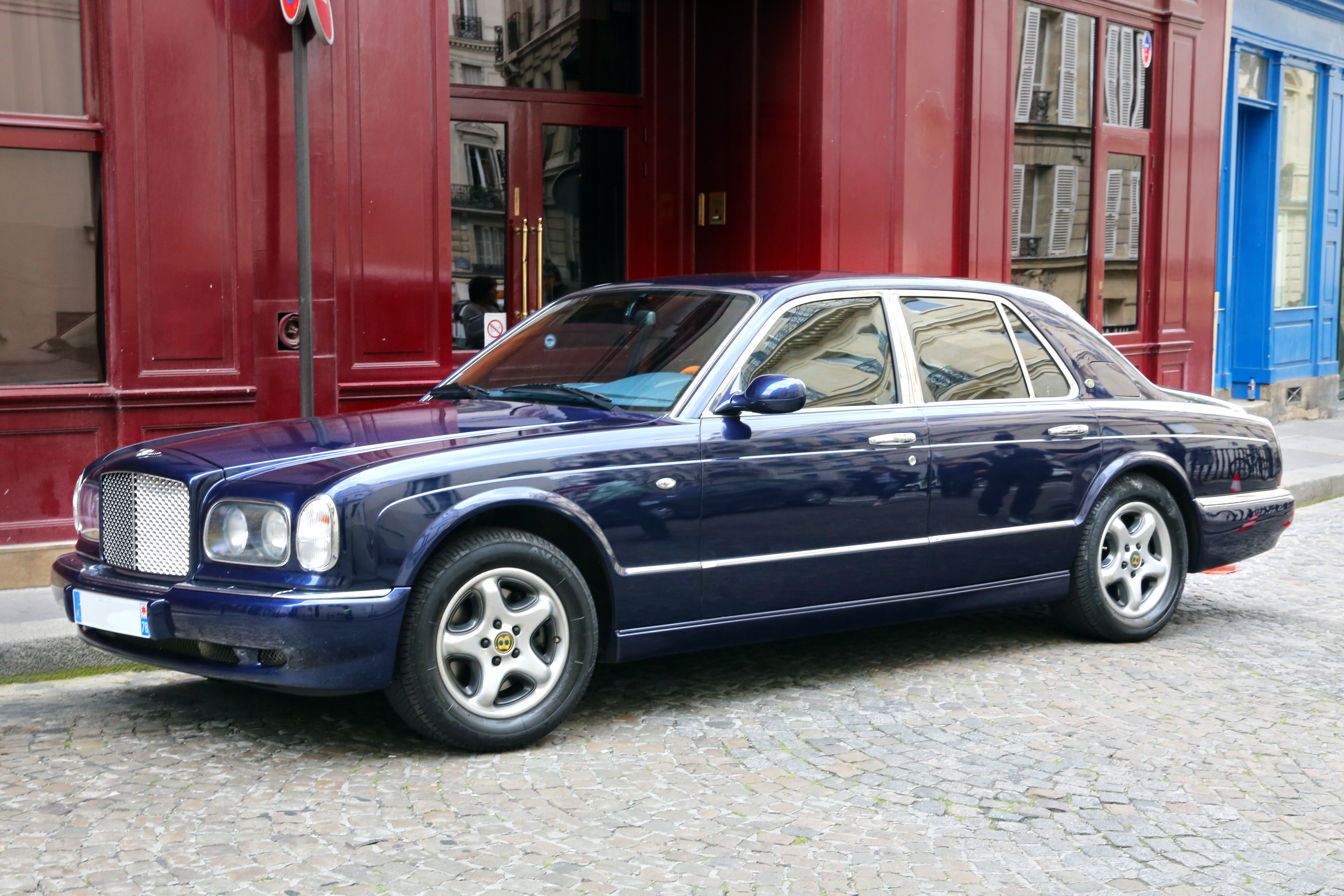
Bentley Arnage Green Label

This version of the car was launched as the Arnage Red Label in October 1999. At the same time Bentley made several minor modifications to the BMW-engined cars, and designated them as the Arnage Green Label for the 2000 model year. Both cars received stiffer body-shells, and larger wheels and brakes. Both changes were necessitated by the larger size and weight of the older British engine. Despite the larger brakes, braking performance worsened. The braking performance of the 1999 Green Label from 113–0 km/h was 172 feet (52 m) while the later Arnage T's performance was 182 feet (55 m) from the same speed. Other revisions included:

- Standard Alpine pop up navigation system.
- Park distance control to the front and rear.
- Increased rear seat leg room (by modifying the design of the front seatbacks).
- Power folding exterior mirrors.
- Modifications to the steering rack to reduce steering effort at low speeds.

The glass headlight lens covers (1998–99) were revised to plastic (2000 on).

Bentley cited customer demand as driving the reversion to the older 6.75-litre engine for the Red Label. The older engine was more biased towards providing low-end torque, and customers preferred that characteristic over the higher-revving BMW engine.

The outgoing BMW-powered Arnage was technically more modern, more fuel efficient and had 32 valves with double overhead camshafts, twin-turbochargers and Bosch engine management technology – as opposed to the 16-valve single-turbocharged pushrod engine with less advanced engine management. The Red Label's increase in motive power shaved less than a second of the 0 to 97 km/h (60 mph) acceleration time. However, the BMW twin-turbocharged unit remained noticeably more agile and responsive from a driver's perspective, due to its more responsive character, better weight balance (maintaining a 51.1/48.9 weight distribution) and almost 272 kg (600 lb) lower curb weight. Ultimately the Green Label was more reliable and significantly less expensive to service in the long term. The key limiting factor of the BMW engine's output was the ZF 5HP30 transmission which was not rated to handle more than the 560 N⋅m (413 lb⋅ft) of torque that the twin-turbocharged engine was tuned to produce.

Vickers had outsourced the production of the old 6.75-litre Rolls-Royce engine for use in the contemporary Continental R and Azure models to Cosworth, so reverting to the old standby engine was a natural choice for the company.

The Red Label model boasted torque of 835 N⋅m (616 lbf⋅ft) with a single Garrett T4 turbocharger. This was the greatest amount of torque for a four-door car at the time.

In total only seven Arnage Green Label units were built, all of which were left-hand-drive versions. There was a final series of cars built in 2000 with the 4.4-litre BMW engine designated the Arnage Birkin, celebrating Tim Birkin of the "Bentley Boys." 52 units were produced and are distinguishable by their three-dial as opposed to five-dial instrument center dashboard configuration.

== Model year updates ==
=== Le Mans series ===
In 2001, Bentley launched a limited-production Le Mans edition to celebrate the occasion of Bentley's return after 71 years to racing at Le Mans. A specially enhanced edition of the Arnage Red label, 150 copies of the Bentley Arnage Le Mans were planned to be produced, but 153 units were produced instead.

Exterior Le Mans Series Options

- Exclusive quad exhaust pipes.
- Ducting vents in the front wing.
- Wide wheel arches and sports bumpers.
- Red brake calipers.
- "Le Mans Series" badges on the front quarter panel.
- 5-spoke sport wheels with red brake calipers.

Interior Le Mans Series Options

- Unique instruments with a dark Racing Green background colour.
- "Le Mans Series" lettering on the speedometer and rev counter.
- Dark finished burr walnut with the Bentley wings etched in intricate detail and inlaid into the waist rails of the doors as well as into the dashboard.
- Winged B motifs embroidered into the headrests of the two-tone, perforated hide upholstery.
- Exclusive chrome and leather design of the gear lever.
- Drilled pedals.
- Unique door sill plaques.
- Three unique colours: Silver Storm, Black Oriole, and Le Mans Racing Green, although any Arnage colour may have been selected.

Identification of the chassis number

The Bentley Arnage Le Mans chassis number follows the same identification as the Bentley Arnage Red label model:

- the letter L on the fourth position,
- the letter C on the fifth position, and
- a number between 6341 and 8375.

=== Arnage LWB and RL ===
In 2001, the Arnage LWB (renamed the RL from MY 2003) was launched at the North American International Auto Show. A long-wheelbase model, the extra length is added to the car at both its front and rear doors (and for ~20 units its C-pillar) to maintain its proportions with the standard Arnage model. Available only as a bespoke ("Mulliner") model, each LWB/RL model is customised to the desires of the buyer. The RL would also present a credible challenge to BMW's revival of the Rolls-Royce brand with its new model, the Phantom.

Wheelbases ranged from 3,336 mm (131.3 in) (or only slightly longer than the standard Arnage) to 3,566 mm (140.4 in), and even 3,844 mm (151.3 in), the latter two including a 100 mm (3.9 in) increase in the height of the roof. The suspension was retuned for the added weight, allowing the larger car to still handle well.

RL models were available with armoured elements, reflecting the car's clientele. A full B6 package was available for $243,000 to $300,000, offering protection from assault weapons and grenades.

The LWB/RL was also the first of a new series of models which would finally cure the Bentley Arnage of the performance deficiencies experienced following the discontinuation of the BMW engines. Though not particularly well advertised for reasons stated above, the LWB/RL's also saw the introduction of an entirely reworked version of the 6.75-litre V8 engine. More than half of the engine's parts were completely new, with Bosch Motronic engine management replacing the old Zytek system and two small Garrett T3 turbochargers replacing the single large T4. This new engine was rated at 405 PS (298 kW; 399 hp) and 835 N⋅m (616 lb⋅ft) of torque and was said to be capable of meeting all future emissions requirements.

=== Arnage R and T ===
In 2002, Bentley updated the Red Label and renamed it the Arnage R and also introduced the Arnage T. The Arnage R was the more luxurious model, while the Arnage T was meant to be more sporty. The Arnage T was claimed to be the most powerful roadgoing Bentley at its launch at the Detroit Motor Show. As with the Arnage R, there were twin-turbochargers, but the engine was tuned and rated at a higher power output of 456 PS (335 kW; 450 hp) and 875 N⋅m (645 lbf⋅ft) of torque. The Arnage T's 0–97 km/h (60 mph) time is 5.5 seconds and it has a claimed top speed of 274 km/h (170 mph). All Arnage R and T models share the same 3,116 mm (122.7 in) wheelbase.

=== UK State Limousine ===
The Bentley State Limousine is an official state car developed by Bentley Motors Limited for Queen Elizabeth II on the occasion of her Golden Jubilee in 2002. Two were built. The car's twin-turbocharged, 6.75-litre V8 engine was modified and rated at 402 PS (296 kW; 397 hp) and 835 N⋅m (616 lb⋅ft) of torque.

=== Updates ===
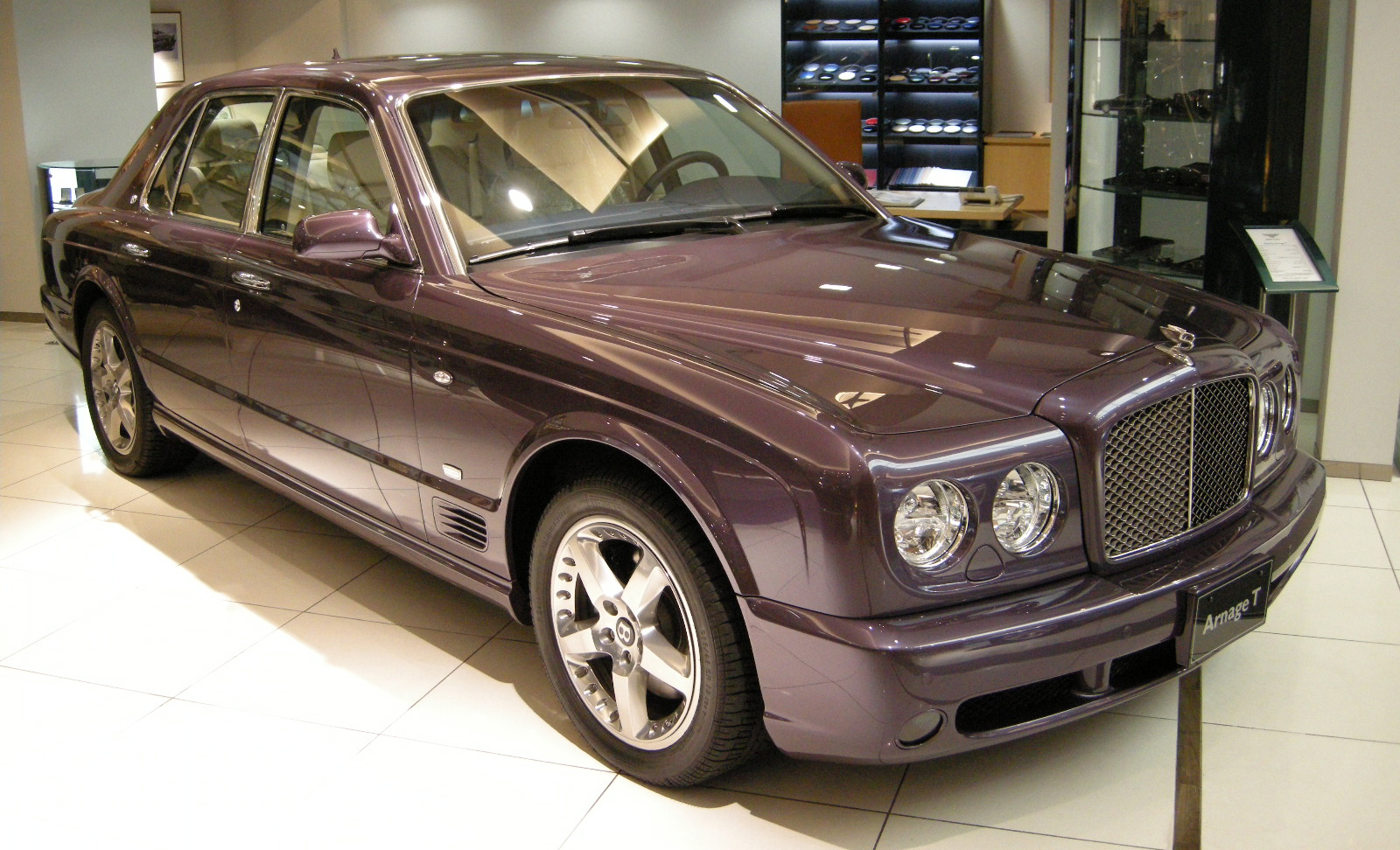
Bentley Arnage T (post 2007 update)

The Arnage range was facelifted in 2005, with a new front end featuring four separate round headlights, resembling the Continental GT. The BMW switchgear used for the climate controls was replaced with new switchgear from the Bentley Azure, and the power window switch placement was changed.

For the 2007 model year, the Garrett turbochargers were replaced with low-inertia Mitsubishi units designed to improve engine response, the outdated 4-speed automatic gearbox was replaced with a 6-speed ZF 6HP26 transmission also found in the Continental GT range and the dot-matrix instrument cluster display used since 1990 was replaced with a full-color screen, also from the Azure.

Power output for the Arnage T was increased to 507 PS (373 kW; 500 hp) and 1,000 N⋅m (738 lbf⋅ft) of torque, while the milder Arnage R was 456 PS (335 kW; 450 hp) and 875 N⋅m (645 lbf⋅ft) of torque. For the Arnage T, the factory stated a 0–97 km/h (60 mph) acceleration time of 5.2 seconds, and a top speed of 288 km/h (179 mph).

=== Diamond series ===
Bentley marked its 60 years of production at the Crewe factory with a special Diamond Series Arnage model in 2006. 60 cars were planned, the majority for the United States, with diamond wood inlays, diamond quilted leather seats, a stainless steel front bumper, special 19 inch alloy wheels, and Union Jack badges on the front wings.

=== Final series ===
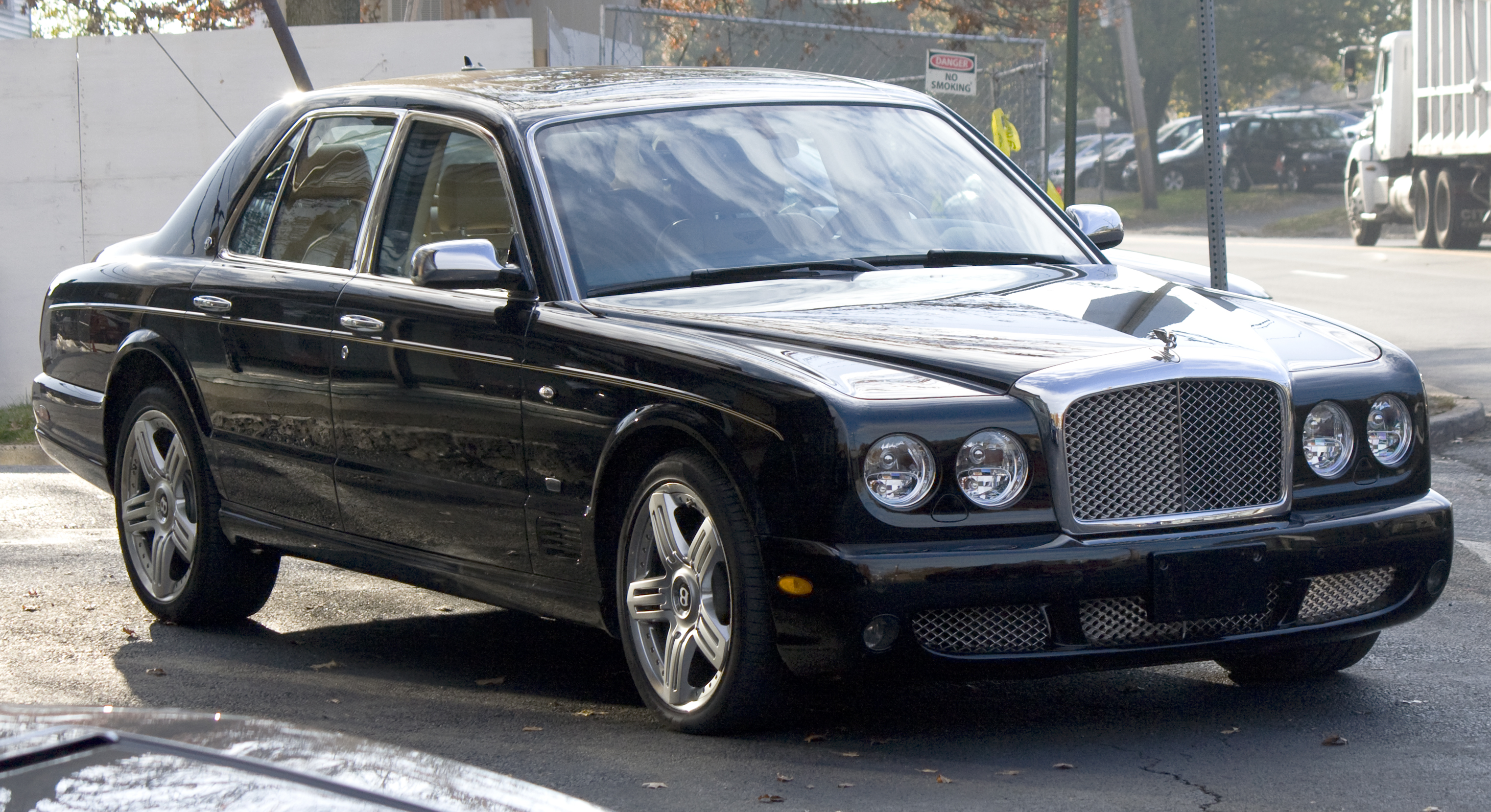
Bentley Arnage "Final Series"

In September 2008, Bentley announced that Arnage production would cease in 2009, with a final run of 150 "Final Series" models (only 96 would be produced until production ceased) .

On the exterior, the Final Series features unique 20 inch alloy wheels, a retractable 'Flying B' hood ornament, body-coloured headlamp bezels, dark tint mesh upper and lower grilles, lower front wing vents, a 'Jewel-style' fuel filler cap and special badging.

The interior, designed by Mulliner, features Final Series kick plates, drilled alloy pedals, unique chrome trim, a rear cocktail cabinet and two picnic tables. The model also comes with four special umbrellas and a premium 1,000 watt audio system manufactured by Naim Audio.

The model is offered with 42 exterior colour choices, 25 interior hides and three wood veneers. It could also be selected with the bespoke colour-matching offered by Bentley.

The Final Series also marked the 50th anniversary of Bentley's V8 engine. The 2009 variant of the engine was still loosely based on the same design that was introduced in the 1959 Bentley S2. But the modern engine shares no interchangeable parts with the 1959 model, the last common item having been replaced in 2005. When the engine was first unveiled promotional literature described power and torque as 'adequate'. Now twin-turbocharged, the all-aluminium alloy engine could sprint to 0–97 km/h (60 mph) in 5.3 seconds. Fuel consumption is heavy, with Bentley stating that the model averages less than 10 mpg in the city and just over 20 on the highway in European testing.

== Powertrains ==
Model	Engine & Displacement	Peak Torque	0-100 km/h (0-62 mph)	Power	Top Speed	Curb Weight
Arnage R and Arnage RL	6.8 L (6800 cc) V8	875 N⋅m (645 lb⋅ft) at 1,800 rpm	5.8 seconds	456 PS (335 kW; 450 hp) at 4,100 rpm	270 km/h (168 mph)	2,655 kg (5,854 lbs)
Arnage T	6.8 L (6800 cc) V8	1,000 N⋅m (738 lb⋅ft) at 3,200 rpm	5.5 seconds	507 PS (373 kW; 500 hp) at 4,200 rpm	290 km/h (180 mph)	2,585 kg (5,699 lbs.)

== Production ==
Year	Production
1998	261
1999	763
2000	1,243
2001	1,049
2002	883
2003	607
2004	790
2005	556
2006	464
2007	357
2008	277
2009	147
2010	-

== Reception ==
The Arnage was well received by the motoring press, with most critics admiring the unimpeachable image but criticising the price and running cost.

- The AA
  'The Arnage is hard to judge in the terms of ordinary cars due to its expense, but despite the price tag it offers a huge amount for the money. It has the image, the grace, performance, luxury and comfort in equal measure, yet it is a class apart from more modern rivals.'
- Auto Express
  'For: Huge performance, classic British luxury, modern safety aids'
  'Against: Whopping price tag, hefty weight, [new Continental] Flying Spur'
- Evo
  'Positives – Improved dynamics, power delivery'
  'Negatives – Fussy interior, almost too much power'
- Parker's Car Guides
  'Pros: Impressive agility for such a big car, sheer road presence, classy image'
  'Cons: Size and running costs'
- RAC (7.6/10)
  'The Bentley Arnage is the finest product ever to come out of the Crewe. Bang up to date where it needs to be and reassuringly anachronistic in other areas, it's mightily impressive'
- Top Gear
  'Imperious, untouchable, gilt-edged yet raw-powered motoring. When the cloud of dust settles this had better be the car you step from, or you're no gentleman'
- What Car?
  'For – The Arnage has lightning-quick acceleration, a luxury interior, and bags of standard kit'
  'Against – It suffers from poor fuel consumption, it lacks practicality, and depreciation will be a huge cost'
- Yahoo! Cars
  'For potential owners of this car, it's not how fast you get there but how you get there that counts'

== Successor ==
The Bentley Arnage was replaced by the Bentley Mulsanne. The design of the car is now completely independent from Rolls-Royce cars, because of separate parent companies, Bentley being held by the Volkswagen Group, Rolls-Royce by BMW.
